= List of business journals =

List of academic journals covering business

This is a list of business journals, including journals in business, management, marketing, finance, accounting, international business, organizational studies, entrepreneurship, and related fields.

== General business ==
- American Journal of Business
- Business and Society Review
- Business Ethics Quarterly
- Business History
- Business History Review
- Business Horizons
- Journal of Business and Psychology
- Journal of Business Communication
- Journal of Business Ethics
- Journal of Business Forecasting
- Journal of Business Research
- Journal of Business Strategy
- Journal of Service Research
- Journal of Small Business Management

== Entrepreneurship ==
- Academy of Entrepreneurship Journal
- Entrepreneurship Theory and Practice
- Family Business Review
- Journal of Business Venturing
- Journal of Developmental Entrepreneurship
- Small Business Economics
- Strategic Entrepreneurship Journal
- The Journal of Entrepreneurship

== Management and organizational ==
- Academy of Management Discoveries
- Academy of Management Journal
- Academy of Management Learning and Education
- Academy of Management Perspectives
- Academy of Management Review
- Administration & Society
- Administrative Science Quarterly
- Australian Journal of Management
- British Journal of Management
- California Management Review
- Canadian Journal of Administrative Sciences
- Group & Organization Management
- Harvard Business Review
- Human Relations
- Information and Organization
- International Journal of Cross Cultural Management
- International Journal of Management Reviews
- Journal of Leadership & Organizational Studies
- Journal of Management
- Journal of Management Education
- Journal of Management Inquiry
- Journal of Management Studies
- Journal of Organizational Behavior
- Leadership
- The Leadership Quarterly
- Management and Organization Review
- Management Learning
- Management Science
- MIT Sloan Management Review
- Organization
- Organizational Behavior and Human Decision Processes
- Organization Science
- Organization Studies
- Organizational Research Methods
- Strategic Management Journal
- Strategic Organization

== Finance ==
- Financial Analysts Journal
- Financial Markets and Portfolio Management
- Finance Research Letters
- Fiscal Studies
- International Finance
- International Review of Economics & Finance
- International Review of Financial Analysis
- Journal of Banking and Finance
- Journal of Behavioral Finance
- The Journal of Finance
- Journal of Financial and Quantitative Analysis
- Journal of Financial Economics
- Journal of Financial Stability
- Journal of Money, Credit and Banking
- The Journal of Portfolio Management
- Journal of Risk and Insurance
- The Journal of Risk
- Quantitative Finance
- Quarterly Journal of Finance
- The Review of Financial Studies

== Marketing ==
- European Journal of Marketing
- Industrial Marketing Management
- International Journal of Research in Marketing
- International Marketing Review
- Journal of Advertising
- Journal of Consumer Affairs
- Journal of Consumer Psychology
- Journal of Consumer Research
- Journal of Consumer Behaviour
- Journal of Interactive Advertising
- Journal of Marketing
- Journal of Marketing Education
- Journal of Marketing Management
- Journal of Marketing Research
- Journal of Marketing Theory and Practice
- Journal of Personal Selling & Sales Management
- Journal of Public Policy & Marketing
- Journal of the Academy of Marketing Science
- Marketing Science

== Accounting ==
- Accounting Historians Journal
- Accounting History
- Accounting History Review
- Accounting Horizons
- Accounting, Auditing & Accountability Journal
- Accounting, Organizations and Society
- Contemporary Accounting Research
- Journal of Accounting and Economics
- Journal of Accounting Research
- Review of Accounting Studies
- The Accounting Review

== International business ==
- Corporate Governance: An International Review
- Cross-Cultural Research
- European Journal of International Management
- Global Business Review
- Global Strategy Journal
- International Small Business Journal
- Journal of International Business Studies
- Journal of International Economics
- Journal of International Management
- Journal of International Money and Finance
- Management International Review

== Supply chain management, logistics and transportation ==
- Decision Sciences
- IIE Transactions
- International Journal of Physical Distribution & Logistics Management
- Journal of Business Logistics
- Journal of Operations Management
- Journal of Purchasing and Supply Management
- Manufacturing & Service Operations Management
- Operations Research
- Production and Operations Management
- Supply Chain Management

== See also ==
- List of business books
- List of economics journals
- List of financial market information services
- Lists of academic journals
