= Joshua Freedman =

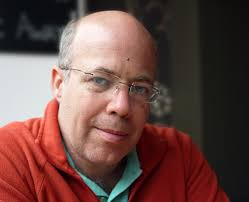
- Photo of Six Seconds CEO Joshua Freedman.
- Education: UCLA
- Occupations: Educator, Businessman, Author
- Writing career
- Subjects: Emotional intelligence, Business leadership

Joshua Freedman is an author, researcher, and organizational development specialist. He is the chief executive officer (CEO) and co-founder of Six Seconds, a nonprofit focused on emotional intelligence (EQ). Freedman has developed several psychometric assessments to measure emotional intelligence in individuals and organizations, including the Six Seconds Emotional Intelligence Assessment (SEI). He leads the State of the Heart study, a global analysis of emotional intelligence that has tracked EQ trends in more than 160 countries since 2011.

Freedman has identified a pattern he calls the "Emotional Recession," a sustained global decline in emotional intelligence scores and its implications for organizational resilience, burnout, and employee engagement. This concept was published as a peer-reviewed study in Frontiers in Psychology in 2025.

== Early life and education ==
Joshua Freedman was born in Berkeley, California in 1967. He attended the Head-Royce School in Oakland. After studying at the University of Toronto, he graduated from the World Arts and Cultures program at the University of California, Los Angeles (UCLA),

== Career ==
=== Early career ===
He later worked as a teacher and administrator at the Nueva School in the San Francisco Bay Area, where he helped implement the "Self-Science" social–emotional learning curriculum. Daniel Goleman cited this program in his 1995 book Emotional Intelligence: Why It Can Matter More Than IQ.

=== Six Seconds ===
In 1997, Freedman co-founded Six Seconds with Anabel Jensen, Karen McCown, and Marsha Rideout to extend emotional intelligence education beyond primary schools into organizations and communities. As of 2025, the organization operates in more than 175 countries through a network of certified practitioners and researchers.

In 2000, Freedman chaired the inaugural NexusEQ conference, an international forum on emotional intelligence in business and education, and later chaired subsequent events, including the seventh conference at Harvard University in 2013.

Freedman served as chief operating officer (COO) beginning in 2004 and became CEO in 2013. Under his leadership, Six Seconds expanded globally and developed EQ-based training programs used by organizations including FedEx, Amazon, Microsoft, Intel, Komatsu, the U.S. Navy, and the United Nations.

Freedman serves as an instructor at Columbia University Teachers College in the Organization and Leadership department, teaching in the Summer Principals Academy NYC program.

Freedman co-created the POP-UP Festival in partnership with UNICEF World Children's Day, a global initiative providing emotional intelligence resources for children in more than 190 countries and territories. In 2018, the POP-UP Festival in Italy received the Medal of the Presidency of the Italian Republic.

== Research ==
Freedman's applied research focuses on organizational climate, factors influencing individual and team performance, and the effects of emotional intelligence on workplace outcomes. He has conducted studies involving retired U.S. National Football League players, business leaders, and organizations across industries. He authored the white paper The Business Case for Emotional Intelligence.

He co-authored the Organizational Vital Signs (OVS) assessment, which measures organizational climate, and developed the Six Seconds Emotional Intelligence Assessment (SEI), a validated instrument used in business and education in more than 22 languages.

Freedman directs the State of the Heart study, a global longitudinal analysis of emotional intelligence based on more than one million SEI assessments. The study tracks trends in emotional intelligence competencies and their relationship to life outcomes across regions and demographics.

In November 2025, Freedman and colleagues published "The Emotional Recession: Global declines in emotional intelligence and its impact on organizational retention, burnout, and workforce resilience" in Frontiers in Psychology. The peer-reviewed study analyzed SEI data from 28,000 adults in 166 countries between 2019 and 2024 and found a statistically significant 5.79% decline in global EQ scores. It reported that individuals with higher emotional intelligence were more than ten times as likely to report strong outcomes across effectiveness, relationships, quality of life, and well-being combined (OR = 10.18).

Additional peer-reviewed publications include research on emotional intelligence in coaching in the Journal of Experiential Psychotherapy (2017), based on a survey of 1,138 coaches and clients in 88 countries; a case study on strengthening social-emotional learning with assessments in the Journal of Applied Developmental Psychology (2017); and a study on emotional intelligence in leadership in the Journal of Leadership Studies (2007).

== Writing ==
Freedman has published eight books. His first, Self-Science: The Emotional Intelligence Curriculum (1998), was written with colleagues from the Nueva School. At the Heart of Leadership: How to Get Results with Emotional Intelligence was first published in 2007 and is now in its fourth edition (2018). It has been translated into Italian, Turkish, Spanish, Korean, and Chinese and has sold more than 50,000 copies. Other works include Inside Change: Transforming Your Organization with Emotional Intelligence (2010, co-authored with Massimiliano Ghini); The Vital Organization: How to Create a High-Performing Workplace (2014, co-authored with Ghini); Whole-Hearted Parenting: How to Use Emotional Intelligence to Create More Peace, Connection, and Joy (2015); and The EQ Gym Workbook: Your 6-Week Workout to Put Emotional Intelligence into Action at Work and for Life (2019, co-authored with Natalie Roitman).

His eighth book, Emotion Rules: The Science and Practice of Emotional Wisdom, was published in 2026.

== Recognition and media ==
Freedman's work has been covered in media outlets including Redbook, O Magazine, and the Today Show. In 2014 he was quoted in Climate One's article 'Ecological Intelligence' and Medical Daily. He has contributed to articles for Christian Science Monitor (2015), Forbes (2013) and In June 2013, Brazil's top business paper Época Negócios published an in-depth interview with Freedman titled How is your emotional intelligence doing? He has been a guest on several radio shows, including a segment on Charles Wolfe's show The Emotion Roadmap: Take the Wheel and Control How You Feel (2013), Bob Gourley's Issues Today (2015) and The Jordan Rich Show (2015).

His scholarly work has appeared in Frontiers in Psychology, the Journal of Applied Developmental Psychology, the Journal of Experiential Psychotherapy, and the Journal of Leadership Studies.

== Books ==
- 1998: Self-Science: The Emotional Intelligence Curriculum (ISBN 978-0962912344, Six Seconds, English and Italian) - co-author
- 1999: The Handle With Care EQ Activity Book (ISBN 978-0962912320, Six Seconds)
- 2007: At the Heart of Leadership (ISBN 978-0971677272, Six Seconds, English, Chinese, and Italian)
- 2010: Inside Change: Transforming Your Organization with Emotional Intelligence (ISBN 978-1935667032, Six Seconds) - with Massimiliano Ghini
- 2014: The Vital Organization: How to create a high-performing workplace (Field Guide) (ISBN 978-1935667223, Six Seconds) - with Massimiliano Ghini
- 2015: Whole-Hearted Parenting: How to use emotional intelligence to create more peace, connection, and joy (ISBN 978-1935667254, Six Seconds)
- 2019: The EQ Gym Workbook: Your 6-Week Workout to Put Emotional Intelligence into Action at Work and for Life (ISBN 978-1935667407, Six Seconds) - with Natalie Roitman
- 2026: Emotion Rules: The Science and Practice of Emotional Wisdom (ISBN 978-1935667520)
