= Colleen Mills =

New Zealand management academic (1955–2022)

- Born: Colleen Elizabeth Pedley; 2 December 1955
- Died: 11 August 2022 (aged 66)
- Education: University of Canterbury
- Scientific career
- Fields: Organisational change and development, communication and sensemaking
- Workplaces: University of Canterbury
- Thesis: Taikyoku: a theory of sensemaking about workplace communication (2000)

Colleen Elizabeth Mills (née Pedley; 2 December 1955 – 11 August 2022) was a New Zealand management academic, specialising in communication and sensemaking in times of disruption. She was a professor of management at the University of Canterbury.

== Biography ==
Mills' first career was in teaching and teacher education. She did a Master of Education with a thesis entitled The nature and variability of tertiary students' learning approaches and test outcomes when learning from text in 1991 before changing her career focus to organisational behaviour and completing a PhD entitled Taikyoku: a theory of sensemaking about workplace communication in 2000. Both qualifications are from the University of Canterbury where she subsequently joined the staff and rose to full professor. She was also an international faculty affiliate (FIA) at Audencia Business School in France.

Mills' research examined organisational processes and stakeholders' sensemaking about these processes, particularly during periods of heightened ambiguity and uncertainty such as during CEO succession, organisational change, business start-up, and natural disasters. For example, she examined how middle managers can implement a company strategy – "materialize a strategic discourse" – by creating physical structures, texts, and tools for workers.

Mills died on 11 August 2022, at the age of 66.

== Selected works ==
- Mills, Colleen. E. (2021). "What’s the story? Using narrative for workplace inquiry." In J. Crossman and S. Bordia (Eds.), EE Handbook of Qualitative Research Methodologies in Workplace Contexts. (pp. 157–175). Cheltenham: Edward Elgar.
- Jeremiah, Faith., Mills, Colleen. E., & Hamilton, Robert. (2021). "Resolving nascent franchisor's identity dilemma."International Studies of Management & Organization 51(4): 354–373. https://doi.org/10.1080/00208825.2021.196913]
- Mills, Colleen. E., & Jeremiah, Faith. (2020). "Franchising microbusinesses: Coupling identity undoing and boundary objects." International Journal of Entrepreneurial Behaviour and Research, 27(1), 231–250. https://doi.org/10.1108/IJEBR-09-2019-0545.
- Mills, Colleen. E. & Burlat, Claire. (2020). "An 'ideological fantasy': How market discourses confuse, obscure and deflect consumers' attention away from the science of energy conservation." Communication Research and Practice 6(4): 312–330. https://doi.org/10.1080/22041451.2020.1885110
- Mills. Colleen. E. (2019). "Negotiating." In O. Hargie (ed.) The Handbook of Communication Skills. (pp. 399–422) London, UK: Routledge.
- Zhao, Xiao, & Mills, Colleen. E. (2019). "Reconciling multiple realities in an international joint venture: A case for deliberately fostering communication hybridity at the interfirm interface." Communication Research and Practice 5(1): 57–72.
- Burlat, Claire. & Mills, Colleen. E. (2018). "Power to the People? How an energy company’s strategic texts constitute the company-consumer interface working against collective action." M@n@gement 21(2): 736–770.
- Mills, Colleen. (2018). "Grappling With the Challenges of Start-Up in the Designer Fashion Industry in a Small Economy: How Social Capital Articulates with Strategies in Practice." In Higgins, D., Jones, P. and McGowan, P. (eds.) Creating Entrepreneurial Space: Talking Through Multi-Voices, Reflections on Emerging Debates (Contemporary Issues in Entrepreneurship Research), Vol. 9A), Emerald Publishing Limited, pp. 129–155. https://doi.org/10.1108/S2040-72462018000009A008
- Mills, Colleen.E. (2018). "Creating Meaningful Dialogic Spaces: A Case of Liberation Management." In Dhiman S., Roberts G., Crossman J. (eds.) The Palgrave Handbook of Workplace Spirituality and Fulfillment. Palgrave Macmillan, Cham. (pp. 773–793) DOI: https://doi.org/10.1007/978-3-319-61929-3_27-1
- Carlton, Sally. & Mills, Colleen. E. (2017). "The Student Volunteer Army: A 'repeat emergent' emergency response organisation." Disasters 41(4): 764–787. (published online 17 January 2017 http://onlinelibrary.wiley.com/journal/10.1111/%28ISSN%291467-7717/earlyview
- Mills, Colleen.E. (2017). "Activity Theory." In C. R. Scott and L. Lewis (eds.) International Encyclopedia of Organizational Communication: 10–18. Malden, MA.
- Mills, Colleen.E., and Francois Cooren. (Eds.) (2016).Discursivity, Relationality and Materiality in the Life of the Organisation: Communication perspectives. Routledge.
- Rogers, Peter., Judith Burnside-Lawry, Jelenko Dragisic, and Colleen E. Mills. (2016). "Collaboration and communication: Building a research agenda and way of working towards community disaster resilience" Disaster Prevention and Management 25(1): 75–90.
- Arnaud, N., Colleen E. Mills, Celine Legrand, and Eric Maton E. (2016). "Materialising strategy in mundane tools: The key to coupling global strategy and local strategy practice?" British Journal of Management 27: 38–57
- Arnaud, Nicolas, & Colleen E. Mills. (2012). "Understanding Inter-Organizational Agency: A Communication Perspective." Group & Organization Management 37(4): 452–485.
- Mills, Colleen. E. (2012). "Navigating the interface between design education and fashion business start-up." Education + Training 54(8/9): 761–777. http://dx.doi.org/10.1108/00400911211274873
- Mills, Colleen E., and Kylie Pawson. (2012). "Integrating motivation, risk-taking and self-identity: A typology of ICT enterprise development narratives." International Small Business Journal 30(5): 584–606.
- Mills, Colleen E. (2011). "Enterprise orientations: A framework for making sense of fashion sector start-up." International Journal of Entrepreneurial Behaviour and Research 17(3): 245–271.
- Mills, Colleen E. (2010). "Experiencing gossip: The foundations for a theory of embedded organizational gossip." Group & Organization Management 35(2): 213–240.
- Mills, Colleen E. (2006). "Modeling sensemaking about communication: How affect and intellect combine." Southern Review 38(2): 9–23.
- Mills, Colleen E., and Kylie Pawson. (2006). "Enterprising talk: A case of self construction." International Journal of Entrepreneurial Behaviour and Research 12(6): 328–344.
- Mills, Colleen E. (2002). "The hidden dimension of blue-collar sensemaking about workplace communication." Journal of Business Communication 39(3): 288–313.
- Lips-Wiersma, Marjolein, and Colleen Mills. (2002). "Coming out of the closet: Negotiating spiritual expression in the workplace." Journal of Managerial Psychology 17(3): 183–202.
- Fleming, Neil D., and Colleen Mills. (1992). "Not another inventory, rather a catalyst for reflection." To Improve the Academy 11: 137–155.
