= Rádio Globo =

Brazilian radio network

Coordinates: 22.9225°S 43.1740°W

Rádio Globo (ZYD 458)
- Logo used since 2019
- Brazil
- Broadcast area: Rio de Janeiro
- Frequency: 98.1 MHz

Programming
- Language: Portuguese
- Format: contemporary hit radio

Ownership
- Owner: Sistema Globo de Rádio; (Rádio Globo Eldorado Ltda.)
- Sister stations: Globo Rio; CBN Rio de Janeiro

History
- First air date: 2 December 1944
- Former call signs: PRE 3 (1944-1970); ZYD 65 (1970-1977); ZYJ 458 (1977-2018)

Technical information
- Licensing authority: ANATEL

Links
- Website: radioglobo.globo.com

Rádio Globo logo from 2014 to 2017.

Rádio Globo is a Brazilian contemporary hit radio network, owned by Sistema Globo de Rádio, a division of Grupo Globo. It was launched on 2 December 1944.

Its journalists anchors are Roberto Canázio and Rosana Jatobá. The company employs more than 200 other journalists.

Until 15 July 2019, Rádio Globo was a full-service network also named Rádio Globo. On that date, the network "flipped" to a Brazilian-style CHR format (also known in the country as "popular radio"), retaining the football broadcasts (branded as "Futebol Globo no Rádio" and simulcast with sister network CBN).

== Owned-and-operated stations ==
- Rio de Janeiro: ZYD 471 - FM 98.1 MHz

== Programs and Communications ==
- Vai na Fé (Padre Omar)
- Café das Seis
  - RJ: Fernando Ceylão e Mariliz Pereira Jorge
  - SP: Mariana Godoy e Marc Tawil
- Papo de Almoço (Léo Jaime, Fernanda Gentil, Adriane Galisteu, Tiago Abravanel, Marcos Veras)
- Tá Rolando Música (Rafa Ferraz)
- Redação Globo (Rosana Jatobá)
- Zona Mista
  - RJ: Pop Bola
  - SP: Rodrigo Rodrigues
- Globo Esportivo
  - RJ: Marcelo Barreto
  - SP: Oscar Ulisses
- Radar do Esporte and Esporte S/A (Carlos Eduardo Eboli)
- Convocadas (Fernanda Gentil)
- Mundo da Luta (Rhodes Lima)
- Em Cartaz (Charles Gavin, Maurício Valladares, Henrique Portugal, Dedé Teicher, Diogo Nogueira)
- Sai do Ar (Rafa Ferraz e Thiago Matheus)
- Cartola FC (Hugo Lago)
- Segue o Jogo (Felipe Andreoli)
- Futebol à Manivela and Domingo + Esportivo (Maurício Bastos)
- Trilha de Craques and Galera da Bola (Rodrigo Rodrigues)
- Revista Rádio Globo (Roberto Canázio)
