= Teresa Scandura =

American academic

Teresa "Terri" Anne Scandura is an American scholar of management and organizational behavior. Scandura's research specialties include leader-member exchange, leadership, mentorship, teams, and applied research methods. She is author of Essentials of Organizational Behavior: An Evidence-Based Approach and Management Today.

== Career and academic administration ==
Dr. Terri Scandura is the Warren C. Johnson Endowed Chair and Professor of Management at the University of Miami, Miami Herbert Business School, where she also serves as Associate Dean for Faculty. From 2007 to 2012, Scandura was Dean of the University of Miami Graduate School.

Scandura is past Associate Editor for Group and Organization Management, the Journal of International Business Studies, Organizational Research Methods, and Journal of Management.

She also served as President of the Southern Management Association (SMA) from 2003 to 2004, elected SMA Vice President and Program Chair-Elect in 2000, and was representative to the Board of Governors from 1997 to 2000.

== Honors and awards ==
In 2025, Scandura was honored at the University of Miami annual Provost's Awards Ceremony with a Lifetime Achievement Award. At the event, Scandura was recognized by Interim Provost for Faculty Affairs, Alexandra C. C. Wilson, who said,

For over three decades, Dr. Terri Scandura has redefined leadership scholarship, especially in the areas of mentoring and organizational behavior...As one of the top-cited scientists in her field and a champion of doctoral mentorship, her influence spans continents and careers. Notably, she was the first woman to hold an endowed chair at the Miami Herbert Business School.

Dr. Scandura was included on Stanford University's World's Top 2% Scientists list for 2023 and also earned the Senior Faculty Research Award from the Miami Herbert Business School in 2020.

At the 2018 Southern Management Association Annual Conference, Scandura was honored with the SMA's most prestigious award, the James G. Hunt SMA Sustained Outstanding Service Award.

== Selected works ==
- Scandura, T. A. & Weinberg, F. J. (2024). Management Today. SAGE Publications; ISBN 9781071884850
- Scandura, T. A. & Meuser, J. D. (2022). Relational Dynamics of Leadership. Annual Review of Organizational Psychology and Organizational Behavior, 9, 309-337.
- Dasborough, M. & Scandura, T. A. (2022). Leading Through the Crisis: "Hands Off" or "Hands-On"? Journal of Leadership and Organizational Studies, 29, 2, 219-223. DOI: 10.1177/15480518211036472
- Scandura, T. A. (2020). Essentials of Organizational Behavior: An evidence-based approach. SAGE Publications; ISBN 978-1544396798 (Winner of the 2022 Textbook Excellence Award from the Textbook & Academic Authors Association (TAA))
- Scandura, T. A. & Mouriño, E. (Eds.) Leading Diversity in the 21st Century. (2017). Information Age Publishing; ISBN 978-1681238760
- Scandura, T. A. & Pellegrini, E. K. (2008). Trust and Leader—Member Exchange: A close look at relational vulnerability. Journal of Leadership & Organizational Studies, 15, 2, 101-110.
- Pellegrini, E. K. & Scandura, T. A. (2005). Construct Equivalence across Groups: An unexplored issue in mentoring research. Educational and Psychological Measurement, 65, 2, 323-335.
- Lankau, M. J. & Scandura, T. A. (2002). An Investigation of Personal Learning in Mentoring Relationships: Content, antecedents, and consequences. Academy of Management Journal, 45, 4, 779-790.
- Scandura, T. A. (1992). Mentorship and Career Mobility: An empirical investigation. Journal of Organizational Behavior, 13, 2, 169-174.
- Scandura, T. A. (1987). Toward a Psychology of Dyadic Organizing. Research in Organizational Behavior, 9, 175-208.
- Scandura, T. A. (1984). Moderating Effects of Initial Leader-Member Exchange Status on the Effects of a Leadership Intervention. Journal of Applied Psychology, 69, 3, 428-436.
