= Stephen Kim =

Stephen Kim may refer to:

- Stephen Jin-Woo Kim (born 1967), former State Department worker
- Stephen Keysuk Kim, marketing academic
- Stephen Kim Sou-hwan (1922–2009), Roman Catholic Cardinal and Archbishop of Seoul
