= Global supply chain management =

Concept in commerce

In commerce, global supply-chain management is defined as the distribution of goods and services throughout a trans-national companies' global network to maximize profit and minimize waste. Essentially, global supply chain-management is the same as supply-chain management, but it focuses on companies and organizations that are trans-national.

Global supply-chain management has six main areas of concentration: logistics management, competitor orientation, customer orientation, supply-chain coordination, supply management, and operations management. These six areas of concentration can be divided into four main areas: marketing, logistics, supply management, and operations management. Successful management of a global supply chain also requires complying with various international regulations set by a variety of non-governmental organizations (e.g. The United Nations).

Global supply-chain management can be impacted by several factors who impose policies that regulate certain aspects of supply chains. Governmental and non-governmental organizations play a key role in the field as they create and enforce laws or regulations which companies must abide by. These regulatory policies often regulate social issues that pertain to the implementation and operation of a global supply chain (e.g. labour, environmental, etc.). These regulatory policies force companies to obey the regulations set in place which often impact a company's profit.

Operating and managing a global supply chain comes with several risks. These risks can be divided into two main categories: supply-side risk and demand side risk. Supply-side risk is a category that includes risks accompanied by the availability of raw materials which effects the ability of the company to satisfy customer demands. Demand-side risk is a category that includes risks that pertain to the availability of the finished product. Depending on the supply chain, a manager may choose to minimize or take on these risks.

Successful global supply-chain management occurs after implementing the appropriate framework of concentration, complying with international regulations set by governments and non-governmental organizations, and recognizing and appropriately handling the risks involved while maximizing profit and minimizing waste.

== Areas of concentration ==
=== Marketing ===
Marketing should be emphasized by global supply chain managers to create customer value, satisfaction, and loyalty. Customer value, satisfaction, and loyalty lead to improved profit margins, which in turn leads to overall corporate growth. Managers need to think about their strategies and the implication of the strategy on the entire supply chain. One market strategy that is commonly used among businesses with global supply chains is the customer perspective strategy.

Taking a customer perspective towards marketing strategy means focusing mainly on customers. This perspective focuses on understanding the complexity of customer values. This perspective involves understanding and how a customer defines and develops their values. By understanding how a customer sets their values, a company is able to make changes to appeal to the customer base's values which in turn leads to greater profit.

There are four common and critical challenges that managers face when attempting to design and implement a marketing strategy that best relates to customer values. The first issue that managers face is the challenge of understanding exactly what customers value in a global supply chain. Understanding customer values in a global supply chain focuses on the task of identifying what supply streams customers value most.

The second challenge is having to understand the constant changes in customer values throughout global supply chains. Since customers are constantly changing what they value, staying ahead of the trend and attempting to predict changing values is increasingly difficult. The third challenge is having to deliver values in a new environment that has never seen this level of marketplace. The global market is becoming increasingly prevalent which companies are taking advantage of, therefore the challenge of attempting to deliver values in a country/region that has never been exposed to a marketplace such as this before arises.

The final challenge is creating and staying committed to the solutions designed to address these issues. Solutions to these challenges are implemented and it is a challenge within itself to stick to these solutions especially as businesses have increased emphasis on cost reduction efforts.

=== Logistics ===
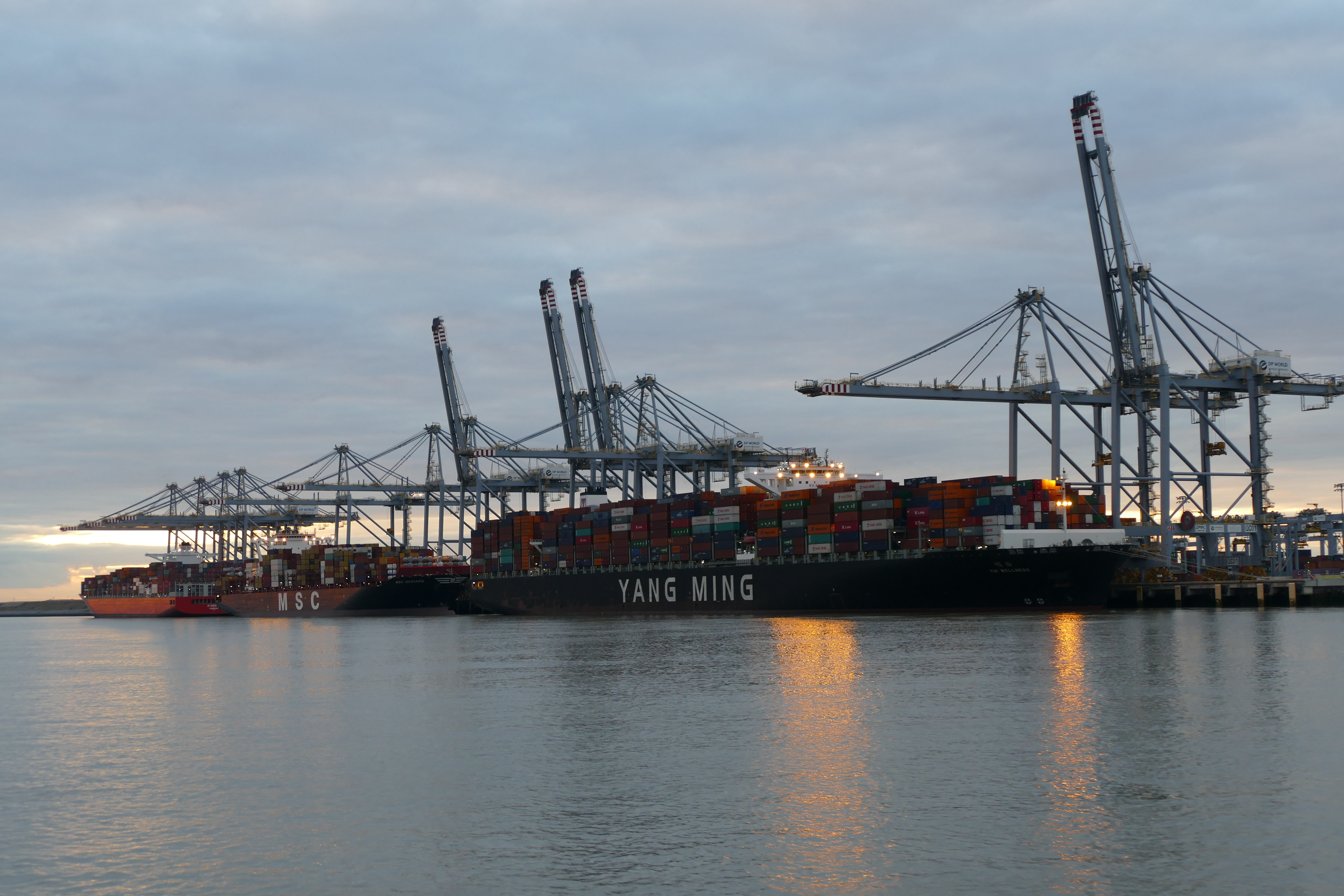
London Gateway is a deepwater port and logistics park in the UK, possessed and manage by DP World

When managing a global supply chain, it is important to place emphasis on logistics performance as there has been an increase in business-to-business international marketing. Logistics is inherently difficult and complex for a global supply chain as it deals with trade regulations, shipping distances, and cross-currency issues. Companies and/or organizations who place an emphasis on logistics management can find themselves with a serious competitive advantage as it has a clear visible impact on customers.

Focusing on customer preferences when implementing and managing a companies logistic services has proven to provide the organization with several benefits. One of the major benefits is cost reduction. Costs can be reduced if the company identifies all the necessary logistic segments and then eliminates unnecessary and redundant. Customizing logistics not only reduces cost, but it also increases revenue by appealing to the customer base which in turn stays loyal to the business.

To remain competitive, organizations may develop global logistics strategies that are aligned with customer needs. Such strategies can support business operations and help companies respond to opportunities in expanding markets global market.

=== Supply management ===
Supply management deals with the development and management of the critical business and supplier relationship. Some companies will use supply chain management software to help manage the flow of products and information. Notable companies that provide supply management services include Oracle, Epicor, Infor, NetSuite and IBM. As the market becomes progressively global, the strategy of outsourcing suppliers is increasingly used. Outsourcing suppliers has several benefits for a business if they can effectively develop the relationship. In 2020 the global supply chain management market was valued at $18.7 million and was projected to reach $52.6 million by 2030.

== Management theories ==
=== The 21st-century logistics framework ===
Closs and Mollenkopf's "21st-century logistics framework" is a global supply-chain management theory that was developed at Michigan State University and was introduced to the business world in 1999. The framework identifies six business competencies that are necessary to operate a global supply chain, with multiple underlying capabilities for each competency which influence management decisions. The six competencies are:

- customer integration,
- internal integration
- material/service supplier integration
- technology and planning integration
- measurement integration, and
- relationship integration.

The capabilities that are attached the competency of customer integration are: segmental focus, relevancy, responsiveness, and flexibility. Segmental focus refers to the ability to develop customer aimed programs that are specifically designed to achieve maximum customer success. Relevancy refers to the ability to maintain and modify customer focuses to reflect the constant changing expectations. Responsiveness refers to the ability to accommodate unique and unforeseen customer requests/requirements. Flexibility refers to the ability to appropriately adapt to any unexpected circumstance.

Cross-functional unification, standardization, simplification, and compliance are the underlying capabilities that are associated with the internal integration competency. Cross-functional unification refers to the ability to put potential co-operative activities into manageable operational processes. Standardization refers to the ability to implement policies/procedures that address any concurrent operations. Simplification refers to the ability to identify, adopt, implement, and improve the best possible business practices. Compliance refers to the ability to follow any established policies.

The capabilities that are related to material/service supplier integration are: strategic alignment, operational fusion, financial linkage, and supplier management. The ability to develop a corporate culture or common vision that create a shared responsibility is defined as strategic alignment. The ability to fuse systems together to reduce redundancy is defined as operational fusion. Financial linkage refers to ability to join financial ventures with suppliers to achieve common goals. Supplier management refers to the ability to extend management to include the hierarchical structure of suppliers.

Information management, internal communication, connectivity, and collaborative forecasting and planning are the capabilities that encompassed by technology and planning integration. The ability to use seamless transactions across the entire chain to allocate resources throughout the chain is called information management. Internal communication refers to the ability to communicate within the business in appropriate manner. The ability to communicate and exchange information between the business and the external supply chain partner is called connectivity. Collaborative forecasting and planning refers to the ability to collaborate with customers to identify and develop shared visions.

The capabilities that underlie measurement integration are: functional assessment, comprehensive metrics, and financial impact. Functional assessment refers to the ability to develop and implement an appropriate performance measurement tool. Comprehensive metrics refers to the ability to implement cross-business performance standards. Financial impact refers to the direct link between overall supply chain performance and the results of the financial measurement.

The capabilities that underlie relationship integration are: role specificity, guidelines, information sharing, and gain/risk sharing. Role specificity refers to the ability to clearly define leadership and establish a set of shared and individual responsibilities. Guidelines refers to the ability to create and implement policies/rules that govern everyday interactions. Information sharing refers to the willingness to share important information (often including financial, technical, or strategic information) throughout the supply chain. Gain/risk sharing refers to the appropriately divide and allocate rewards/penalties.

The 21st-century logistics framework allows managers to identify and implement the most important underlying capabilities that are encompassed in the six business competencies. The framework gives managers the freedom to decide what they believe to be the most important capabilities that need to be implemented to run a successful global supply chain.

=== Human collaboration theory ===
The human collaboration theory suggests that there is strong evidence to prove that investment in supply-chain management have the largest impacts when they focus on enabling supply chain collaboration. This management theory focuses on the manager's ability to invest in and promote human collaboration between employees throughout the global supply chain.

Human collaboration is defined as the use of skills through harmonization of individuals, teams and organizations to achieve greater things not achievable by an individual person. The human collaboration theory/framework lays out four key components. The first component deals with the forces that drive change, the second focuses on people-technology-process assets that create network collaboration, the third deals with resisting forces which encourage people to resist collaboration, and the fourth component looks at the desired collaboration performance. The theory states that to implement and operate a successful global supply chain, a manager must understand and use these components.

The theory states that to implement and operate the best collaboration system, a manager must build trust between the different players of the chain (supplier and manufacturer), establish a culture which supports decision making and work, implement a proper reward system, and use synergistic activities.

According to the theory's creators, a manager must follow four steps to transform their network into a more collaborative network. The first step is to recognize that to be competitive the company will require innovations which can be proposed by people outside the corporate boundary and therefore to access these people they need to be more collaborative with external partners. They then must alter their views of achieving collaboration by acknowledging the different types of collaboration (transactional, co-operative, coordinated, synchronized). Next, a manager must develop a collaborative plan that achieve the goals he/she sets out to achieve. Finally a manager must develop the right controls to ensure the goals/mission can be met. If a manager follows the recommendations made by this theory, then they will have implemented a proper global supply chain that focuses on human collaboration which in turn will yield better results.

== International regulations ==
=== Role of government ===
Governments can play a large role in regulating certain aspects of a global supply chains. Governments have a wide range of policy instruments that they can use to implement regulations. These instruments include but are not limited to: taxation, financial incentives, regulation, liberalization, infrastructure, land use planning, and advice and exhortation. However, before designing and implementing a regulation, it is important for governments to properly analyze any second-order effects that might occur. Second order effects are defined as the offsetting effects that happen elsewhere because of the implementation of a policy.

Recently, there has been a steady incline of governments creating and implementing regulations to promote green supply chains.

To design and implement the appropriate government's need to take into account the five aspects of sustainable logistics. The first is reducing freight transport intensity as it is becoming necessary for governments to introduce explicit policies to encourage companies to reduce the amount of freight movement within their system. The second aspect is freight modal split, which the author describes as shifting freight to greener transport modes. Governments can promote this by using policy instruments (usually taxation, financial incentives, regulation, and infrastructural measures).

The third aspect is vehicle use which governments must attempt to promote companies to improve their use of road freight. This can be done through taxation, regulation, liberalization, and advice committees. The fourth aspect is increasing energy efficiency which often is seen with the introduction of general efficiency programs. Governments can raise fuel duty, subsidize driver training schemes, reduce and enforce speed limits, impose fuel economy standards, incentivize scrappage of old vehicles and give advice to promote a higher standard of energy efficiency. The fifth and final aspect is cutting emissions relative to energy use which needs to be addressed through a policy.

=== Role of the United Nations ===
The United Nations plays a big role in designing and implementing international regulations that have huge impacts on the operation and management of global supply chains. The United Nations created the UN Global Compact which is an organization that aims to mobilize a global movement of sustainable companies and stakeholders.

The UN Global Compact attempts to mobilize a global movement by supporting companies to be responsible and to advance societal goals. The organization has created a set of ten principles which they expect companies to abide by. The ten principles fall under the broader categories of human rights, labour, environment, and anti-corruption.

With regards to human rights the organization encourages businesses to support and respect human rights, and make sure they are not abusing any established human rights laws. The labour principles deal with the recognition of collective bargaining, elimination of forced labour, abolition of child labour, and elimination of discrimination. The environment principles focus on being cautious to environmental challenges, promoting greater environmental responsibility, and encouraging the development of environmentally friendly technologies. The anti-corruption principle states that businesses should work against corruption. They have published two guides which illustrate how businesses can implement the ten principles throughout their supply chains and integrate sustainability. These guides state that companies can achieve supply chain sustainability by taking certain steps which include: committing, defining, implementing, assessing, measuring, and communicating to effectively become sustainable.

=== Role of business organisations ===
SEDEX, the Supplier Ethical Data Exchange, is a well-known nonprofit membership organization with over 60,000 members, dedicated to driving improvements in responsible and ethical business practices in global supply chains. SEDEX launched a reporting tool in 2019 called "Sedex Analytics", which "allows businesses to drill down on site-specific issues that can affect workers" within their global supply chains.

== Risks of operation ==
=== Supply-side risk ===
Supply-side risk is a category that includes risks accompanied by the availability of raw materials which affects the ability of the company to satisfy customer demands. Several issues can arise from operating a global supply chain. Common supply side risks include the fact that it takes a long time to receive products from around the world, and that suppliers may not necessarily operate to the same quality standards.

Outsourcing suppliers may provide a business several benefits but a lot of risk comes attached to it. One major risk is the fact that global currencies are constantly changing, a small change in foreign currency could have a large impact on the overall profit a business receives. Supplier order processing time variability is another supply-side risk that comes increasingly risky when outsourcing suppliers. This risk is defined by the fact that the time it takes a supplier to fulfill an order can change for every order. Businesses are not exactly sure how the supplier is going to deal with the order and whether they will be able to deliver products on time.

=== Demand-side risk ===
Demand-side risk is a category that includes risks that pertain to the availability of the finished product. Demand-side risks mainly occur when companies are unable to deal with the demands of the customer base. This can happen when customer demand is higher than supply, and the company does not have enough stock to appropriately deal with the customer demand. Since customer demand changes so frequently it is tough for managers to forecast what is needed for the next month which creates the risk of running out of stock.
