= Mollenkopf (surname) =

Mollenkopf is a surname. Notable people with the surname include:

- Diane Mollenkopf, American professor of supply chain management at the University of Canterbury, New Zealand
- Jack Mollenkopf (1905–1975), American football coach
- John Mollenkopf (born 1946), American political scientist and sociologist
- Steve Mollenkopf, CEO of Qualcomm Inc. since 2013
