= Programme Yarrow =

Emergency management program in the UK

Programme Yarrow is a British government contingency plan to deal with possible nationwide power blackouts. The plan includes scenarios where power supply is severely compromised for up to a week. The plan was originally developed in 2021 to address the possibility of a major failure of the National Grid.

The plan was stress tested by government in late 2022 to deal with possible outages caused by fuel shortages as a consequence of the 2022 Russian invasion of Ukraine. Another exercise, Noble Birch, had been conducted in previous months to test the practicality of government continuity in the absence of power.
