= Joseph F. Hair Jr. =

American author and professor

Joseph F. Hair Jr. is an American author, consultant, and professor. Currently he serves as Distinguished Professor of Marketing, is the holder of the Cleverdon Chair of Business and Director of the PhD program at the Mitchell College of Business at the University of South Alabama. Previously he held the positions of Senior Scholar, DBA program at the Michael J. Coles College of Business at Kennesaw State University, and held the Copeland Endowed Chair of Entrepreneurship in the Ourso College of Business Administration at Louisiana Louisiana State University. He has authored over 100 editions of his books, including Multivariate Data Analysis (8th edition, 2019) (cited 201,000+ times), Essentials of Business Research Methods (5th edition, 2023), A Primer on Partial Least Squares Structural Equation Modeling - PLS (3rd edition, 2022), and Essentials of Marketing Research (6th edition, 2024), and MKTG (14th edition, 2024). He is noted for his contributions to Marketing Research and Multivariate Data Analysis. In the years 2018 - 2024 Clarivate Analytics recognized Dr. Hair as part of the top 1% of all Business and Economics professors in the world.

== Professional service and memberships ==
Hair is a member of the Academy of Marketing Science, the American Marketing Association, the Society for Marketing Advances, the Marketing Management Association, the Academy of Business Research, and the Southwestern Marketing Association, and has served as president of three of these organizations. He has served on the editorial review boards of several academic journals, including the Journal of the Academy of Marketing Science, Journal of Retailing, Journal of Business Research, Journal of Family Business Strategy, Journal of Personal Selling and Sales Management, Industrial Management & Data Systems, European Business Review, Journal of Marketing Analytics, Journal of Global Scholars of Marketing Science, and Journal of Marketing Theory and Practice.
