= Michèle Akoorie =

New Zealand business academic

Michele Akoorie
- Education: University of Waikato
- Scientific career
- Institutions: University of Waikato
- Thesis: The impact of foreign direct investment and government policy on the internationalisation process of the New Zealand firm (1995)

Michele E. M. Akoorie is a New Zealand business academic. She is currently a full professor at the University of Waikato.

== Academic career ==
After a 1995 PhD titled 'The impact of foreign direct investment and government policy on the internationalisation process of the New Zealand firm' at the University of Waikato, she joined the University of Waikato staff, rising to full professor.

In 2003 Akoorie won a national-level teaching award.

== Selected works ==
- Peiris, Indujeeva K., Michèle EM Akoorie, and Paresha Sinha. "International entrepreneurship: A critical analysis of studies in the past two decades and future directions for research." Journal of International Entrepreneurship 10, no. 4 (2012): 279–324.
- Marshall, R. Scott, Michèle EM Akoorie, Ralph Hamann, and Paresha Sinha. "Environmental practices in the wine industry: An empirical application of the theory of reasoned action and stakeholder theory in the United States and New Zealand." Journal of World Business 45, no. 4 (2010): 405–414.
- Sinha, Paresha, Michèle EM Akoorie, Qiang Ding, and Qian Wu. "What motivates manufacturing SMEs to outsource offshore in China? Comparing the perspectives of SME manufacturers and their suppliers." Strategic Outsourcing: An International Journal 4, no. 1 (2011): 67–88.
- Sinha, Paresha, and Michèle EM Akoorie. "Sustainable environmental practices in the New Zealand wine industry: an analysis of perceived institutional pressures and the role of exports." Journal of Asia-Pacific Business 11, no. 1 (2010): 50–74.
- Enderwick, Peter, and Michele Akoorie. "Pilot study research note: The employment of foreign language specialists and export success–The case of New Zealand." International Marketing Review 11, no. 4 (1994): 4–18.
- Enderwick, Peter, and Michele Akoorie. Fast Forward: New Zealand Business in World Markets. Auckland: Longman Paul, 1996.
