= List of Pi Sigma Epsilon chapters =

Pi Sigma Epsilon is a professional fraternity for students and industry professionals in marketing and management. It was established at Georgia State University in 1952. In the following chapter list, active chapters are indicated in bold and inactive chapters and institutions are in italics.

Chapter	Charter date and range	Institution	Location	Affiliation	Status	Ref.
Alpha	June 2, 1952	Georgia State University	Atlanta, Georgia	SME of Atlanta	Inactive	
Beta	1953	University of Utah	Salt Lake City, Utah	SME of Utah	Inactive	
**Gamma**	1954	University of Georgia	Athens, Georgia	SME of Atlanta	Active	
Delta	1956	University of Southern Mississippi	Hattiesburg, Mississippi	SME of Hattiesburg	Inactive	
Epsilon	1956	Auburn University	Auburn, Alabama	SME of Montgomery	Inactive	
Zeta	1957	University of Louisiana at Monroe	Monroe, Louisiana	SME of Shreveport	Inactive	
**Eta**	1958	University of Florida	Gainesville, Florida	SME of Jacksonville	Active	
Theta	1958	Hofstra University	Hempstead and Uniondale, New York	SME of Long Island	Inactive	
Iota	1958	Arizona State University	Tempe, Arizona	SME of Phoenix	Inactive	
Kappa	1958	University of Memphis	Memphis, Tennessee	SME of Memphis	Inactive	
Lambda	1958	Adelphi University	Garden City, New York	SME of Long Island	Inactive	
Mu	1959	St. John's University	New York City, New York	SME of Long Island	Inactive	
Nu	1960	City College of New York	New York City, New York	SME of New York	Inactive	
Xi	1960	LaSalle College	Montreal, Quebec, Canada	SME of Philadelphia	Inactive	
Omicron	1960	University at Buffalo	Buffalo, New York	SME of Buffalo	Inactive	
Pi	1960	University of Detroit Mercy	Detroit, Michigan	SME of Detroit	Inactive	
Rho	1960	California State University, Long Beach	Long Beach, California	SME of Long Beach	Inactive	
Sigma	1961	New York University	New York City, New York	SEC of New York	Inactive	
Tau	1961	University of Puerto Rico	San Juan, Puerto RIco	SME of San Juan	Inactive	
Upsilon	1961	University of Hawaiʻi at Mānoa	Mānoa, Honolulu, Hawaii	SME of Hawaii	Inactive	
Phi	1961	California State University, Los Angeles	Los Angeles, California	SME of Los Angeles	Inactive	
Chi	1961	Pace University	New York City and Westchester County, New York	SME of New York	Inactive	
**Psi**	1961	University of Minnesota	Minneapolis, Minnesota	SME of Minneapolis	Inactive	
Omega	1962	American University	Washington, D.C.	SME of Washington	Inactive	
Alpha Alpha	1962	Detroit Institute of Technology	Detroit, Michigan	SME of Detroit	Inactive	(Note: The college closed in 1981.)
Alpha Beta	1962	Southern Illinois University Carbondale	Carbondale, Illinois	SME of St. Louis	Inactive	
Alpha Gamma	1962	Georgia Tech	Atlanta, Georgia	SME of Atlanta	Inactive	
Alpha Delta	1962	University of Texas at Arlington	Arlington, Texas	SME of Fort Worth	Inactive	
Alpha Epsilon	1962	Marquette University	Milwaukee, Wisconsin	SME of Milwaukee	Inactive	
Alpha Zeta	1963	Villanova University	Villanova, Pennsylvania	SME of Philadelphia	Inactive	
Alpha Eta	1963	Mississippi State University	Mississippi State, Mississippi	SME of Jackson	Inactive	
Alpha Theta	1963	University of Mississippi	Oxford, Mississippi	SME of Jackson	Active	
Alpha Iota	1963	University of Evansville	Evansville, Indiana	SME of Evansville	Inactive	
Alpha Kappa	1964	Virginia Commonwealth University	Richmond, Virginia	SME of Richmond	Active	
Alpha Lambda	1963	Northern Arizona University	Flagstaff, Arizona	SME of Phoenix	Inactive	
Alpha Mu	1965	California State University, Fresno	Fresno, California	SME of Fresno	Inactive	
Alpha Nu	1964	City College of New York	New York City, New York	SEC of New York	Inactive	
Alpha Xi	1965	University of Wisconsin–Milwaukee	Milwaukee, Wisconsin	SME of Milwaukee	Inactive	
Alpha Omicron	1965	Western Kentucky University	Bowling Green, Kentucky	SME of Louisville	Inactive	
Alpha Pi	1965	Middle Tennessee State University	Murfreesboro, Tennessee	SME of Nashville	Inactive	
**Alpha Rho**	1966	University of South Carolina	Columbia, South Carolina	SME of Columbia	Active	
Alpha Sigma	1966	Boston College	Chestnut Hill, Massachusetts	SME of Boston	Inactive	
Alpha Tau	1966	Seton Hall University	South Orange, New Jersey	SEC of Newark	Inactive	
Alpha Upsilon	1967	Gannon University	Erie, Pennsylvania	SME of Erie	Inactive	
Alpha Phi	1967	University of Arkansas at Little Rock	Little Rock, Arkansas	SME of Little Rock	Inactive	
Alpha Chi	1967	Xavier University	Cincinnati, Ohio	SME of Cincinnati	Inactive	
Alpha Psi	1967	Nicholls State University	Thibodaux, Louisiana	SME of New Orleans	Inactive	
**Alpha Omega**	1968	Carthage College	Kenosha, Wisconsin	SME of Kenosha	Active	
Beta Alpha	1968	Roosevelt University	Chicago, Illinois	SME of Chicago	Inactive	
Beta Beta	1969	University of South Florida	Tampa, Florida	SME of Tampa	Inactive	
**Beta Gamma**	1969	University of Wisconsin–Whitewater	Whitewater, Wisconsin	SME of Madison	Active	
Beta Delta	1969	East Texas A&M University	Commerce, Texas	SME of Dallas	Inactive	
Beta Epsilon	1969	Cleveland State University	Cleveland, Ohio	SME of Cleveland	Inactive	
Beta Zeta	1970	University of Louisville	Louisville, Kentucky	SME of Louisville	Inactive	
Beta Eta	1970	Seattle University	Seattle, Washington	SME of Seattle	Inactive	
Beta Theta	1970	University of Wisconsin–Oshkosh	Oshkosh, Wisconsin	SME of NE Wisconsin	Inactive	
Beta Iota	1971	University of Southern California	Los Angeles, California	SME of Los Angeles	Inactive	
Beta Kappa	1971	California State Polytechnic University, Pomona	Pomona, California	SME of Los Angeles	Inactive	
Beta Lambda	1971	University of New Haven	West Haven, Connecticut	SME of New Haven	Inactive	
Beta Mu	1971	Boise State University	Boise, Idaho	SME of Boise	Inactive	
Beta Nu	1971	Robert Morris University	Moon Township, Pennsylvania	SME of Pittsburgh	Inactive	
**Beta Xi**	1971	Louisiana State University	Baton Rouge, Louisiana	SME of New Orleans	Active	
Beta Omicron	1971	University of Tulsa	Tulsa, Oklahoma	SME of Tulsa	Inactive	
Beta Pi	1971	University of Houston	Houston, Texas	SME of Houston	Inactive	
Beta Rho	1972	Linfield College	McMinnville, and Portland, Oregon	SME of Portland	Inactive	
Beta Sigma	1972	University of Missouri–St. Louis	St. Louis, Missouri	SME of St. Louis	Inactive	
Beta Tau	1972	University of Tennessee at Chattanooga	Chattanooga, Tennessee	SME of Chattanooga	Inactive	
Beta Upsilon	1972	Weber State University	Ogden, Utah	SME of Utah	Inactive	
Beta Phi	1972	University of Alabama	Tuscaloosa, Alabama	SME of Birmingham	Inactive	
Beta Chi	1972	Bowie State University	Bowie, Maryland	SME of Washington	Inactive	
Beta Psi	1973	Sam Houston State University	Huntsville, Texas	SME of Houston	Inactive	
Beta Omega	1972	Northern Kentucky University	Highland Heights, Kentucky	SME of Cincinnati	Inactive	
**Gamma Alpha**	1974	California State University, Fullerton	Fullerton, California	SME of Orange Cty	Active	
Gamma Beta	1974	University of Wisconsin–Parkside	Kenosha, Wisconsin	SME of Kenosha	Inactive	
**Gamma Gamma**	1975	Miami University	Oxford, Ohio	SME of Dayton	Active	
Gamma Delta	1975	Oregon State University	Corvallis, Oregon	SME of Portland	Inactive	
Gamma Epsilon	1975	DePaul University	Chicago, Illinois	SME of Chicago	Inactive	
**Gamma Zeta**	1975	Northern Illinois University	DeKalb, Illinois	SME of Rockford	Active	
Gamma Eta	1975	Louisiana State University Shreveport	Shreveport, Louisiana	SME of Shreveport	Inactive	
Gamma Theta	1978	Wichita State University	Wichita, Kansas	SME of Wichita	Inactive	
Gamma Iota	1978	Minnesota State University Moorhead	Moorhead, Minnesota	SME of Fargo	Inactive	
Gamma Kappa	1978	University of Akron	Akron, Ohio	SME of Akron	Inactive	
**Gamma Lambda**	1978	Georgia Southern University	Statesboro, Georgia	SME of Atlanta	Active	
Gamma Mu	1979	Louisiana Tech University	Ruston, Louisiana	SME of Shreveport	Inactive	
**Gamma Nu**	1980	Ohio State University	Columbus, Ohio	SME of Columbus	Active	
**Gamma Xi**	1980	Appalachian State University	Boone, North Carolina	SME of Charlotte	Active	
Gamma Omicron	1980	University of North Carolina at Charlotte	Charlotte, North Carolina	SME of Charlotte	Inactive	
Gamma Pi	1981	Mississippi College	Clinton, Mississippi	SME of Jackson	Inactive	
Gamma Rho	1981	Furman University	Greenville, South Carolina	SME of Greenville	Inactive	
Gamma Sigma	1982	South Carolina State University	Orangeburg, South Carolina		Inactive	
Gamma Tau	1982	University at Albany, SUNY	Albany, New York	SME of Albany	Inactive	
Gamma Upsilon	1983	Iowa State University	Ames, Iowa	SME of Des Moines	Inactive	
Gamma Phi	1983	Texas A&M University	College Station, Texas	SME of Houston	Inactive	
Gamma Chi	1983	University of Louisiana at Lafayette	Lafayette, Louisiana	SME of Baton Rouge	Inactive	
Gamma Psi	1983	Tarleton State University	Stephenville, Texas	SME of Fort Worth	Inactive	
**Gamma Omega**	1984	Kansas State University	Manhattan, Kansas	SME of Topeka	Active	
Delta Alpha	1985	University of Alabama at Birmingham	Birmingham, Alabama	SME of Birmingham	Inactive	
Delta Beta	1985	University of St. Thomas	Saint Paul, Minnesota	SME of Minn./St. Paul	Inactive	
Delta Gamma	1986	Kennesaw State University	Cobb County, Georgia	SME of Atlanta	Inactive	
Delta Delta	1986	University of Central Florida	Orlando, Florida	SME of Orlando	Inactive	
**Delta Epsilon**	1986	Virginia Tech	Blacksburg, Virginia	SME of Roanoke	Active	
Delta Zeta	1986	University of Iowa	Iowa City, Iowa	SME of Central Iowa	Inactive	
Delta Eta	1986	University of North Carolina at Greensboro	Greensboro, North Carolina	SME of Greensboro	Inactive	
Delta Theta	1987	Syracuse University	Syracuse, New York	SME of C. New York	Inactive	
Delta Iota	1987	Temple University	Philadelphia, Pennsylvania	SME of Philadelphia	Inactive	
Delta Kappa	1987	Baylor University	Waco, Texas	SME of Dallas	Inactive	
**Delta Lambda**	1987	Florida State University	Tallahassee, Florida	SME of Jacksonville	Active	
**Delta Mu**	1988	University of South Dakota	Vermillion, South Dakota	SME of Sioux Falls	Active	
Delta Nu	1988	University of Tampa	Tampa, Florida	SME of Tampa	Inactive	
Delta Xi	1989	University of Tennessee at Martin	Martin, Tennessee	SME of Nashville	Inactive	
Delta Omicron	1989	Alverno College	Milwaukee, Wisconsin	SME of Milwaukee	Inactive	
Delta Pi	1990	Bowling Green State University	Bowling Green, Ohio	SME of Cleveland	Inactive	
Delta Rho	1990	James Madison University	Harrisonburg, Virginia	SME of Richmond	Inactive	
Delta Sigma	1990	University of Minnesota Duluth	Duluth, Minnesota	SME of Minn./St. Paul	Inactive	
**Delta Tau**	1991	University of North Carolina Wilmington	Wilmington, North Carolina	SME of Cape Fear	Active	
Delta Upsilon	1991	Valdosta State University	Valdosta, Georgia	SME of Jacksonville	Inactive	
Delta Phi	1991	Harding University	Searcy, Arkansas	SME of Little Rock	Inactive	
**Delta Chi**	1991	Duquesne University	Pittsburgh, Pennsylvania	SME of Pittsburgh	Active	
Delta Psi	1991	Catawba College	Salisbury, North Carolina	SME of Salisbury	Inactive	
**Delta Omega**	1992	Illinois State University	Normal, Illinois	SME of Chicago	Active	
**Epsilon Alpha**	1993	Old Dominion University	Norfolk, Virginia	SME of Tidewater	Active	
Epsilon Beta	1993	Meredith College	Raleigh, North Carolina	SME of Raleigh	Inactive	
Epsilon Gamma	1993	University of North Texas	Denton, Texas	SME of Fort Worth	Inactive	
**Epsilon Delta**	1994	University of Toledo	Toledo, Ohio	SME of Detroit	Active	
Epsilon Epsilon	1994	Ball State University	Muncie, Indiana	SME of Fort Wayne	Inactive	
Epsilon Zeta	1995	California State University, East Bay	Hayward, California	SME of Bay Area	Inactive	
Epsilon Eta	1995	Millersville University of Pennsylvania	Millersville, Pennsylvania	SME of Lancaster	Inactive	
**Epsilon Theta**	1996	University of Northern Iowa	Cedar Falls, Iowa	SME of Des Moines	Active	
Epsilon Iota	1996	University of San Diego	San Diego, California	SME of Los Angeles	Inactive	
Epsilon Kappa	1996	Belmont University	Nashville, Tennessee	SME of Nashville	Inactive	
Epsilon Lambda	1998	Purdue University	West Lafayette, Indiana	SME of Fort Wayne	Inactive	
Epsilon Mu	1999	University of Cincinnati	Cincinnati, Ohio	SME of Cincinnati	Inactive	
Epsilon Nu	2001	St. Catherine University	Saint Paul, Minnesota	SME of Minn./St. Paul	Inactive	
Epsilon Xi	2004	St. Bonaventure University	St. Bonaventure, New York	SME of Buffalo/Ngra	Inactive	
**Epsilon Omicron**	2004	Indiana University Bloomington	Bloomington, Indiana	Kelley School of Business	Active	
Epsilon Pi	2004	University of Central Arkansas	Conway, Arkansas	SME of Little Rock	Inactive	
Epsilon Rho	2005	Southern University	Baton Rouge, Louisiana	SME of Baton Rouge	Inactive	
Epsilon Sigma	2005	William Paterson University	Wayne, New Jersey	SME of Eastern NY	Inactive	
Epsilon Tau	2005	Norfolk State University	Norfolk, Virginia		Inactive	
Epsilon Upsilon	2005	Wilkes University	Wilkes-Barre, Pennsylvania	SME of Lancaster	Inactive	
**Epsilon Phi**	2005	Elon University	Elon, North Carolina		Active	
Epsilon Chi	2007	Tuskegee University	Tuskegee, Alabama		Inactive	
Epsilon Psi	2005	Florida A&M University	Tallahassee, Florida	SME of Tampa	Inactive	
Epsilon Omega	2006	University of Connecticut	Storrs, Connecticut		Inactive	
**Zeta Alpha**	2007	Cornell University	Ithaca, New York		Active	
Zeta Beta	2007	Sacramento City College	Sacramento, California		Inactive	
Zeta Gamma	2008	Baruch College	New York City, New York		Inactive	
Zeta Delta	2008	Pennsylvania State University	State College, Pennsylvania		Inactive	
**Zeta Epsilon**	2008	University of Wisconsin–Eau Claire	Eau Claire, Wisconsin		Active	
**Zeta Zeta**	2009	The College of New Jersey	Ewing Township, New Jersey		Active	
Zeta Eta	2009	Widener University	Chester, Pennsylvania		Inactive	
Zeta Theta					Inactive	
Zeta Iota					Inactive	
**Zeta Kappa**		University of Missouri	Columbia, Missouri		Active	
Zeta Lambda		Winston-Salem State University	Winston-Salem, North Carolina		Inactive	
Zeta Mu		Northeastern University	Boston, Massachusetts		Inactive	
**Zeta Nu**		Central Michigan University	Mount Pleasant, Michigan		Active	
**Zeta Xi**		Kent State University	Kent, Ohio		Active	
Zeta Omicron		Winona State University	Winona, Minnesota		Inactive	
Zeta Pi		North Carolina A&T State University	Greensboro, North Carolina		Inactive	
Zeta Rho		Bryant University	Smithfield, Rhode Island		Inactive	
Zeta Sigma		Radford University	Radford, Virginia		Inactive	
Zeta Tau					Inactive	
Zeta Upsilon					Inactive	
Zeta Phi		University of North Alabama	Florence, Alabama		Inactive	
**Zeta Chi**	2013	University of California, Berkeley	Berkeley, California		Active	
Zeta Psi		Rider University	Lawrence Township, New Jersey		Inactive	
Zeta Omega		San Diego State University	San Diego, California		Inactive	
Eta Alpha		The Citadel	Charleston, South Carolina		Inactive	
**Eta Beta**		Michigan State University	East Lansing, Michigan		Active	
**Eta Gamma**	2015	University of Maryland, College Park	College Park, Maryland		Active	
**Eta Delta**		University of Dayton	Dayton, Ohio		Active	
**Eta Epsilon**	2015	University of California, Los Angeles	Los Angeles, California		Active	
Eta Zeta	2014	Youngstown State University	Youngstown, Ohio		Inactive	
Eta Eta						
Eta Theta						
**Eta Iota**		University of Michigan	Ann Arbor, Michigan		Active	
Eta Kappa						
Eta Lambda	2018	Penn State Harrisburg	Lower Swatara Township, Pennsylvania		Inactive	
Eta Mu	2017	St. Cloud State University	St. Cloud, Minnesota		Inactive	
**Eta Nu**		Bloomsburg University	Bloomsburg, Pennsylvania		Active	
**Eta Xi**	2018	Western Colorado University	Gunnison, Colorado		Active	
Eta Omicron						
**Eta Pi**		Ohio University	Athens, Ohio		Active	
**Eta Sigma**		Robert Morris University	Moon Township, Pennsylvania		Active	
**Eta Tau**		Southeastern Louisiana University	Hammond, Louisiana		Active	
**Eta Upsilon**		Metropolitan State University - Denver	Denver, Colorado		Active	
Eta Phi						
Eta Chi						
Eta Psi						
Eta Omega						
**Theta Alpha**	2024	University of North Carolina - Chapel Hill	Chapel Hill, North Carolina		Active	
**Theta Beta**	2025	George Washington University	Washington D.C.		Active	
**Theta Gamma**	2025	University of California - Riverside	Riverside, California		Active	
