= GOM =

GOM, G.O.M., or gom may refer to:

== Codes ==
- gom, ISO 639-3 code for Goan Konkani language
- GOM, National Rail station code for Gomshall railway station

== People ==
- Leona Gom (born 1946), Canadian novelist and poet
- William Ewart Gladstone (1809–1898), nicknamed G.O.M., from the phrase "Grand Old Man"

== Other uses ==
- Good Old Mad or GOM, a reimplementation of the original 7090 MAD programming language
- Gravity & Other Myths, an Australian acrobatic contemporary circus troupe
- Group & Organization Management, a peer-reviewed academic journal
- Gulf of Mexico, an ocean basin bordering on Mexico, the southern United States and Cuba
- Knight Grand Officer Royal Order of Monisaraphon, post-nominal letters

== See also ==
- Gom jabbar, a fictional device in Frank Herber's Dune universe
- GOM Player, a media player for Windows
- GOMS (for Goals, Operators, Methods, and Selection rules), a specialized model for human computer interaction observation
