= Marc Tawil =

Brazilian strategist

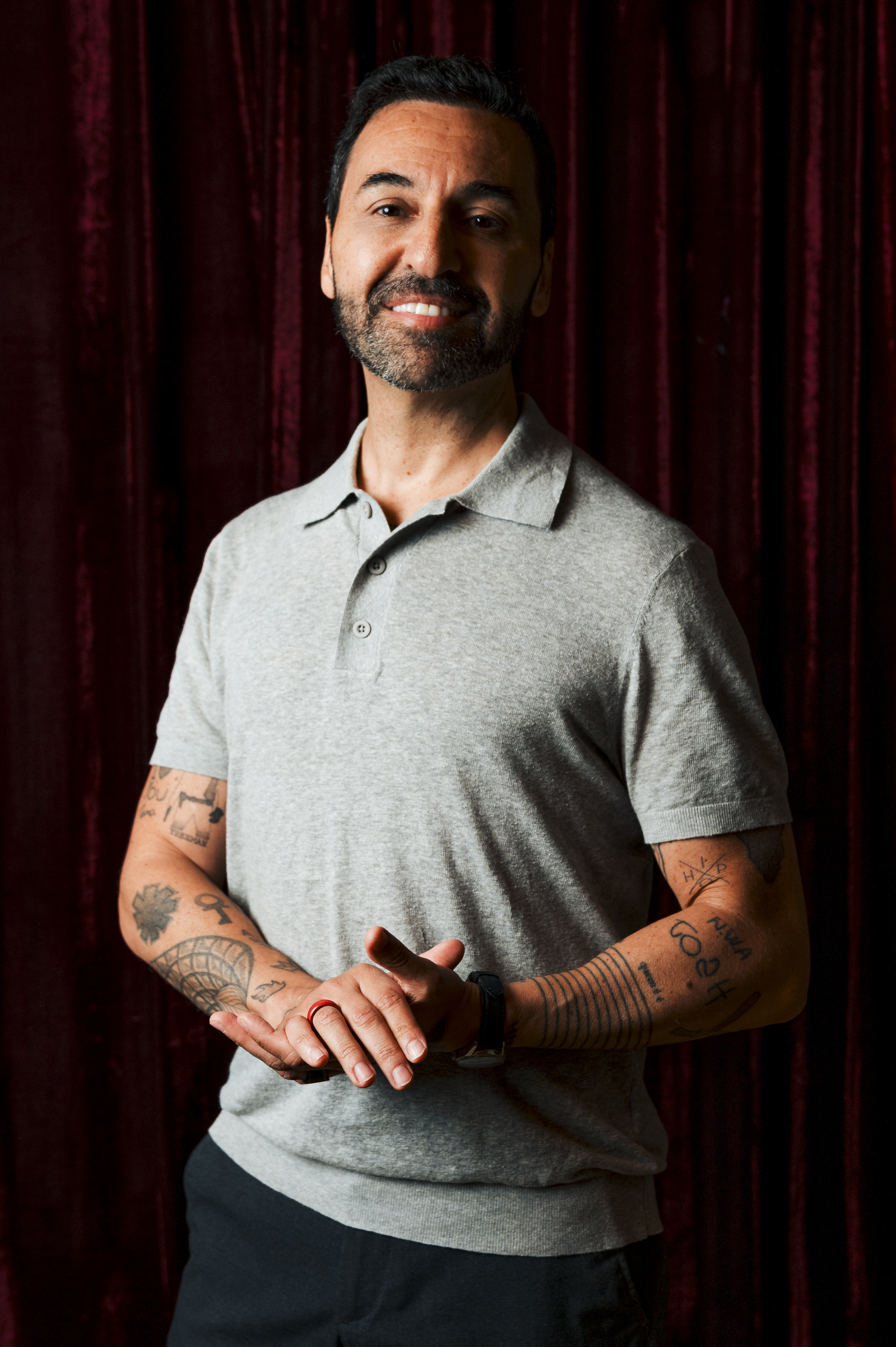
- Born: Marc Enrique Tawil; December 16, 1973 (age 52); São Paulo, São Paulo, Brazil
- Occupations: communication strategist; educator; writer; and entrepreneur
- Known for: First LinkedIn Top Voice in Brazil
- Website: https://tawil.com.br

Marc Enrique Tawil (born, December 16, 1973) is a Brazilian communication strategist, entrepreneur, educator and writer. In 2016, he ranked first on the inaugural LinkedIn Brazil Top Voices list.

Since 2025, he has written a column on marketing, communication and influence for Exame. Over the course of 17 years, he worked in media groups such as Jovem Pan, O Estado de S. Paulo, Globo and Band.

As a speaker, he teaches classes in the areas of communication, multigenerational workplaces, digital culture, relational intelligence and the impact of artificial intelligence on leadership. Over the years, he has spoken at events such as TEDx, Web Summit Lisbon, Conferência do Jornalismo Cidadão de Angola, CMO Summit and Gramado Summit.

He is a member of the Reputation Council of Ipsos and the advisory board of Escola da Nuvem, also one of the directors of the Israelite Confederation of Brazil (CONIB).

== Early life and education ==
Marc Tawil was born in São Paulo, Brazil, into a Jewish family of Sephardic origin, with Syrian and Lebanese roots. His mother, Mireille Demal Tawil, was born in Cairo, Egypt. Isaac Tawil, his father, artistically known as Jacques Lelong, was born in Beirut, Lebanon.

His parents immigrated separately to Paris, France, where they met and married in 1970, later settling in Brazil in the year of his birth, 1973.

Tawil completed his schooling at the Lycée Pasteur and, later, at Colégio Renascença, an institution linked to the Jewish community where he participated in Jewish cultural and educational activities.

Tawil has a degree in Social Communication from the Universidade São Judas Tadeu (USJT), holds an MBA in Business Management from Fundação Getulio Vargas (FGV) and an MBA in Marketing from the Luiz de Queiroz College of Agriculture (ESALQ-USP).

== Career ==
=== Journalism ===
Tawil began his journalistic career in 1995, when he joined the team at A Resenha Judaica, then a printed newspaper for the Jewish community in São Paulo, where he worked as a reporter and editor.

He worked at Rádio Jovem Pan between 1997 and 2000, progressing from radio monitoring to an international editor. In 2000, he was invited to join the team of Jornal da Tarde, a newspaper of Grupo Estado (Estadão), where he remained until November 2007.

Between 2008 and 2010, Tawil worked at Rádio BandNews FM (Grupo Band) as a field reporter and host.

After venturing into the communications sector with his own agency, starting in 2010, he would return to the radio between 2018 and 2019,as a commentator on the São Paulo edition of the Café das 6 program, on Rádio Globo, a morning show hosted by Mariana Godoy.

After this period (2019-2021), Tawil rejoined Jovem Pan to host the Autoperformance podcast, on leadership and personal development.

In 2025, after six years writing the column “Futuro do Trabalho” in Época Negócios, he began on Exame a column with analysis of marketing, communication and influence.

Throughout his career, Tawil also collaborated with outlets such as Transformação Digital and Portal Comunique-se.

=== Communication agency ===
In 2010, Tawil began working as an entrepreneur in the communications sector, when he founded the corporate communication agency Dialoog. In 2016, the company was renamed Tawil Comunicação.

During its period of activity, the company obtained certifications and recognitions in management and workplace environment: in 2017, the B Corporation (B Corp) certification, granted by B Lab in 2018, the agency was included in the global Best for the World ranking. One year later, in 2019, the company was named the best small business to work for in Brazil.

In 2020, during the COVID-19 pandemic, Tawil closed the agency to work independently as a speaker, educator and consultant.

=== Teaching ===
During the COVID-19 pandemic, Tawil began his work as an executive educator and as a postgraduate professor at higher education institutions, including HSM University, PUC-RS and the University of São Paulo (USP).

As an instructor at LinkedIn Learning, Tawil teaches courses on relational intelligence, multigenerational workplaces, leadership communication, and positioning.

=== Board memberships ===
Since 2023, Tawil has been a member of the Ipsos Reputation Council. He served on editorial and advisory boards of the Escola da Nuvem.He is a director at the Israelite Confederation of Brazil (CONIB). He is a member of Empreendedores.com and BR Nation.

His previous roles include editorial and advisory boards at organizations linked to business, education and communication, such as the HSM Management magazine, the Refugee Reintegration Institute (Adus), and the Comunique-se ecosystem. He was also director of the Instituto Capitalismo Consciente Brasil.

=== Published works ===
- Trânsito Assassino – Deaths Increase, Nobody Cares (2007) – Author
- Haja Saco, O Livro (2009) – Co-author
- Um Olhar, by Rita Diwan (2018) – Editor
- O Pulo do Gato, by Claudio Junqueira (2018) – Editor
- Social Selling 4.0 (2019) – Foreword author

== Awards and recognition ==
In 2016, Tawil ranked first in the inaugural Brazilian edition of LinkedIn Top Voices.

Under his leadership, Tawil Comunicação obtained B Corp certification in 2017 and was ranked first among small and medium-sized businesses by Great Place to Work Brazil in 2019.

In 2023, he was inducted into the Hall of Fame of the Brazilian Marketing Academy (Abramark). Also in 2023, he received the Aberje Special Award – Vozes Influentes da Comunicação.

Between 2024 and 2025, Tawil was listed as the leading communication specialist on LinkedIn Brazil by the French martech platform Favikon.

In 2025, he was awarded the Martin Luther King Jr. Award from Jethro International and was featured in industry rankings by RH Summit and the TOP 20 IBest Award.

In 2026, he was honored as the leading communication specialist on LinkedIn Brazil by Favikon for the third consecutive year.

=== Awards and nominations ===
| Age | Award | Category | Result | Ref. |
|---|---|---|---|---|
| 2017 | Comunique-se | Entrepreneurship | Nominated | |
| 2019 | Comunique-se | Journalist and digital influencer | Nominated | |
| 2023 | Aberje Award | Special Awards – Influential Voices in Communication | Won | |
| 2025 | Martin Luther King | Social services and humanitarian causes | Won | |
