= Theodore Cross =

American lawyer

- Born: Theodore Lamont Cross II; February 12, 1924; Newton, Massachusetts, U.S.
- Died: February 28, 2010 (aged 86); Fort Myers, Florida, U.S.
- Education: Amherst College (BA); Harvard University (LLB)
- Known for: Civil rights activist and bird photographer

Theodore Lamont Cross II (February 12, 1924 – February 28, 2010) was an American lawyer, civil rights activist, publisher, investor, and bird photographer.

== Biography ==
Cross served as a naval officer in the Pacific War of World War II. After the Navy, he obtained an English degree from Amherst College and a law degree from Harvard Law School in 1950.

After working as an attorney, Cross became an entrepreneur, investing in publications. Cross worked professionally in the publishing industry. In 1983, he and partners bought Investment Dealer's Digest and sold it three years later for approximately 40 times the purchase price. He received widespread attention in 1987 for his attempt to acquire Harper & Row (now HarperCollins) for a reported $190 million, but was outbid by Rupert Murdoch. In the mid-1980s, Cross acquired 53% of the Frost & Sullivan stock

Cross was the founder and editor of The Journal of Blacks in Higher Education and founder of the Business and Society Review.

Cross took a leave of absence from his job working as general counsel for Sheraton hotels and participated in the voting rights marches of 1965. Cross later served as an adviser to the Richard Nixon and Lyndon B. Johnson administrations.

Cross published two books of bird photography: Birds of the Sea, Shore, and Tundra (1989) and Waterbirds (2009). Waterbirds in particular received stellar reviews. E.O. Wilson commented that a photo in Waterbirds "is a candidate for the most beautiful illustration of birds in existence, photo or painting."

Cross was elected to the American Philosophical Society in 1995.

Cross also founded Birders United, a group formed in 2004 to oppose President George W. Bush's reelection on habitat destruction grounds, but who later expanded its role to a general political watchdog group for bird habitats.

== Works ==
- Cross, Theodore L. (1969). Black Capitalism. Atheneum. ISBN 978-0-689-70266-2.
- The Black Power Imperative (1984)
- Birds of the Sea, Shore, and Tundra (1989)
- Waterbirds (2009)
