= Financial Markets and Portfolio Management =

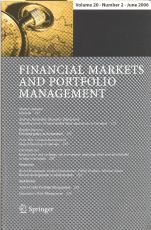
- Discipline: Finance
- Language: English

Publication details
- History: 1987 to present
- Publisher: Swiss Society for Financial Market Research (SGF) (Switzerland)

Standard abbreviations
- ISO 4: Financ. Mark. Portf. Manag.

Indexing
- ISSN: 1555-4961

Links
- Journal homepage

Financial Markets and Portfolio Management (FMPM) is a journal publishing original research and survey articles in all areas of finance, especially in financial markets, portfolio theory, wealth management, asset pricing, risk management, and regulation. Its principal objective is to serve as a bridge between innovative research and practical application. The readers of the journal are researcher, economists, asset managers, financial analysts, and other professionals in finance and related areas.

FMPM is quarterly published by the Swiss Society for Financial Market Research (SGF) since 1987. Article submissions are subject to a double-blind peer review. The acceptance rate of submitted articles in FMPM is approximately 10%.

Notable contributors to the journal include Yakov Amihud, Stanley Fischer, Harry M. Markowitz, Merton Miller, Richard Roll, Stephen Ross, William F. Sharpe, and William T. Ziemba.

Manuel Ammann serves as the journal's current editor. The editorial board includes Rolf Banz, Jonathan Berk, Wolfgang Bessler, Jean-Pierre Danthine, Wolfgang Drobetz, Günter Franke, Philippe Jorion, Francis Longstaff, Markus Rudolf, Thomas Stucki, René M. Stulz, David Yermack, Heinz Zimmermann.

FMPM is indexed in EBSCO, ECONIS, EconLit, E-JEL, JEL on CD, Journal of Economic Literature, Research Papers in Economics (RePEc), and SCOPUS.
