= Sistema Globo de Rádio =

Rádio Globo S.A
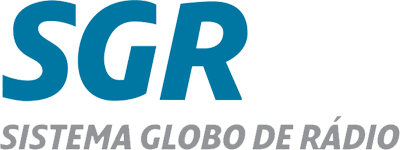
- Trade name: Sistema Globo de Rádio
- Company type: Subsidiary of Grupo Globo
- Industry: Broadcasting
- Founded: 2 December 1944; 81 years ago
- Founder: Roberto Marinho
- Headquarters: Rio de Janeiro, Rio de Janeiro, Brazil
- Area served: Brazil
- Key people: Marcelo Soares (CEO)
- Parent: Grupo Globo
- Subsidiaries: Rádio Globo; CBN; BH FM
- Website: globoradio.globo.com

Sistema Globo de Rádio (in English: Globo Radio System), or SGR, is a Brazilian media group owned by Grupo Globo that began with the inauguration of Rádio Globo in 1944, and today it has control of several other radios from different parts of Brazil. SGR also operates in the Pay-TV segment, where its radios offer music programming options to more than 6 million subscribers of Sky Brazil, Oi TV and Claro TV+ operators.

In 1975, the SGR began to adopt a logo whose letters resemble that of Globo Network, made by Hans Donner with the color dark blue, with the name of "Sistema Globo de Rádio". In 2009, the SGR started to have a distinct visual identity of Globo, adopting a logo in the colors blue and gray, with the name SGR.

Previously, the group operated in the web radio segment, with Multishow FM, GNT Radio, Radio Canal Brasil and Radio Impacto, as well as Globo FM and RadioBeat, which replaced its former terrestrial stations in Rio de Janeiro. In 2015, with the extinction of these last two, the SGR stopped operating with web radios.

== Stations ==
- BH FM - 102.1 MHz
- CBN RJ - 92.5 MHz
- CBN SP - 90.5 MHz
- CBN Brasília - 95.3 MHz
- CBN Belo Horizonte -106.1 MHz
- Globo RJ FM - 98.1 MHz
