= The Journal of Blacks in Higher Education =

Online magazine for African Americans in academia

- Discipline: Education
- Language: English
- Edited by: Robert Bruce Slater

Publication details
- History: 1993–present
- Publisher: BRUCON Publishing (United States)
- Frequency: Quarterly

Standard abbreviations
- ISO 4: J. Blacks High. Educ.

Indexing
- ISSN: 1077-3711 (print); 2326-6023 (web)
- LCCN: 93664388
- JSTOR: 10773711
- OCLC no.: 40892795

Links
- Journal homepage

The Journal of Blacks in Higher Education is a former academic journal, now an online magazine, for African Americans working in academia in the United States and as a source for reflecting concern for racial equity in higher education.

The journal was established as a quarterly in 1993 by Theodore Cross, a "champion of civil rights" and the journal's longtime editor-in-chief. The last print issue appeared in 2010. Issues published between 1993 and 2010 are available on JSTOR. However, the magazine still publishes articles on its website. It reports and comments on statistical information pertaining to black students and faculty in the United States. According to Rhonda Sharpe and William Darity it is "a key resource for publicly consumable statistical reports about the status of blacks in higher education".

Its publisher is headquartered in Bartonsville, Pennsylvania.
