= International Purchasing & Supply Education & Research Association =

International Purchasing and Supply Education and Research Association
- Abbreviation: IPSERA
- Formation: 1991
- Type: Professional body
- Legal status: Association
- Purpose: Educational/practitioner
- Members: 300+ in 30+ countries
- Leader: Michael Henke
- Main organ: Executive Committee
- Website: http://www.ipsera.com/

The International Purchasing & Supply Education & Research Association (IPSERA) is a learned society in the field of purchasing and supply management. Established in 1990 as PSERG (Purchasing and Supply Education and Research Group), it has over 300 members in more than 30 countries.

== Conferences ==
The Annual Meeting of the IPSERA is held each year in late March or early April. Due to IPSERA's geographically diverse membership, the location of its annual meeting rotates amongst the continents.

== Nodes and centers of excellence ==
IPSERA currently has 4 Academic Centers of Excellence and 11 Regional Nodes. Nodes are academic groups of a minimum of 5 persons who work in the field of purchasing and supply management. Nodes organize workshops or regional meetings that are supported by IPSERA.

== Bursaries ==
IPSERA has several bursaries available to attend the IPSERA Conference and the IFPSM summer school.

== Publications ==
IPSERA has no own journal. However, the Journal of Purchasing and Supply Management publishes a yearly special issue containing selected papers from the IPSERA annual meeting.
