= Frost & Sullivan =

American business consulting firm

- Company type: Private
- Industry: Market research, consulting
- Founded: 1961; 65 years ago
- Founder: Dan L. Sullivan; Lore A. Frost
- Headquarters: Santa Clara, California, United States
- Key people: David Frigstad (chairman)
- Services: management consulting, market research
- Number of employees: 1200
- Website: frost.com

Frost & Sullivan is an American business consulting firm. It offers market research and analysis, growth strategy consulting, and corporate training. It has about 45 offices in the Americas, Africa, Asia and Europe; the principal office is in Santa Clara, California.

== History ==
Frost & Sullivan was started by Dan L. Sullivan and Lore A. Frost in New York City in 1961. In the 1970s it started a corporate training division, began sponsoring conferences and industry meetings, and opened an office in London.

In 1982, it was publicly traded, and had annual revenues of $9.1 million. By 1987 revenue had grown to around $17.5 million, with $290,000 in net earnings. Theodore Cross acquired 53% of the stock in the mid-1980s. In January 1988 the company was taken private by merger with a subsidiary of FAS Acquisition Co., a company formed by Cross and Warburg Pincus Capital. It was sold to David Frigstad in 1993.

A sales office in New York was damaged in the September 11 attacks. During the ensuing recession the company laid off 10% of its 700 staff.

Frost & Sullivan issues industry awards based on research using a proprietary methodology, which is sometimes based on a single article produced by the receiver of the award. Organizations that receive a Frost & Sullivan award must pay a fee to communicate the outcome to the public.
