= Stephen Keysuk Kim =

South Korean marketing academic

- 김기석

Academic background
- Education: Korea University, University of Southern California
- Thesis: A Study on the Content and Determinants of Close Exchange Relationships in Channels of Distribution (1993)

Academic work
- Discipline: Marketing
- Institutions: Baruch College, Oregon State University, Iowa State University

Stephen Keysuk Kim (Korean: 김기석; Hanja: 金基錫) is a South Korean marketing scholar whose research focuses on new forms of interfirm governance, interfirm control systems, and the allocation of decision rights in marketing and sales. He is the Raisbeck Endowed Professor in Business in the department of marketing at Iowa State University's Debbie and Jerry Ivy College of Business.

== Academic career ==
Kim earned a Bachelor of Science in business administration from Korea University in 1984, followed by a Master of Business Administration specializing in marketing in 1987. He subsequently pursued doctoral studies in marketing at the University of Southern California, completing his PhD in 1993. During his studies he also worked as a teaching assistant in South Korea and as an instructor in the US.

Kim served as an assistant professor at Baruch College from 1993 to 1997 and at Oregon State University from 1997 to 2001, when he was promoted to associate professor. In 2006, he joined the faculty of Iowa State University, where he was promoted to full professor in 2012. Since 2017, he has held the Raisbeck Endowed Professor in Business.

Kim has published several dozen book chapters and articles in peer-reviewed academic journals. According to Google Scholar, his publications have received more than 3,300 citations, giving him an h-index of 22.

== Selected works ==
The following articles have each been cited over 300 times:

- Loyalty: The Influences of Satisfaction and Brand Community Integration. Journal of Marketing Theory and Practice (2003): 1-11. With James H. McAlexander and Scott D. Roberts.
- On Interfirm Power, Channel Climate, and Solidarity in Industrial Distributor-Supplier Dyads. Journal of the Academy of Marketing Science 28.3 (2000): 388-405.
- Business Model Innovation Performance: When Does Adding a New Business Model Benefit an Incumbent?. Strategic Entrepreneurship Journal 9.1 (2015): 34-57. With Sungwook Min.
