= Six Seconds =

American nonprofit

- Founded: 1997
- Purpose: Emotional intelligence, Social emotional learning
- Region served: Worldwide
- President: Anabel Jensen
- CEO: Joshua Freedman
- Website: 6seconds.org

Six Seconds is a California-based international 501(c)3 non-profit organization that researches and teaches emotional intelligence. Founded in 1997 by Karen McCown, Anabel Jensen, Joshua Freedman, and Marsha Rideout, Six Seconds is the first and largest organization dedicated to the development of emotional intelligence, with offices in 10 countries and agents in about 50. The stated mission is to increase the world’s emotional intelligence, by working in business, education and other areas.

The organization publishes EQ tests, and the SEI test, in particular, has been used in a number of peer-reviewed studies on emotional intelligence.

== Overview ==
Six Seconds was founded in California in 1997. In his 1995 book Emotional Intelligence, Daniel Goleman wrote about a curriculum called "Self-Science" as a model of how to teach EQ. Six Seconds President Anabel Jensen, Ph.D. had been Executive Director of the Nueva School from 1983 to 1997, where she helped develop the curriculum along with other Nueva School staff.

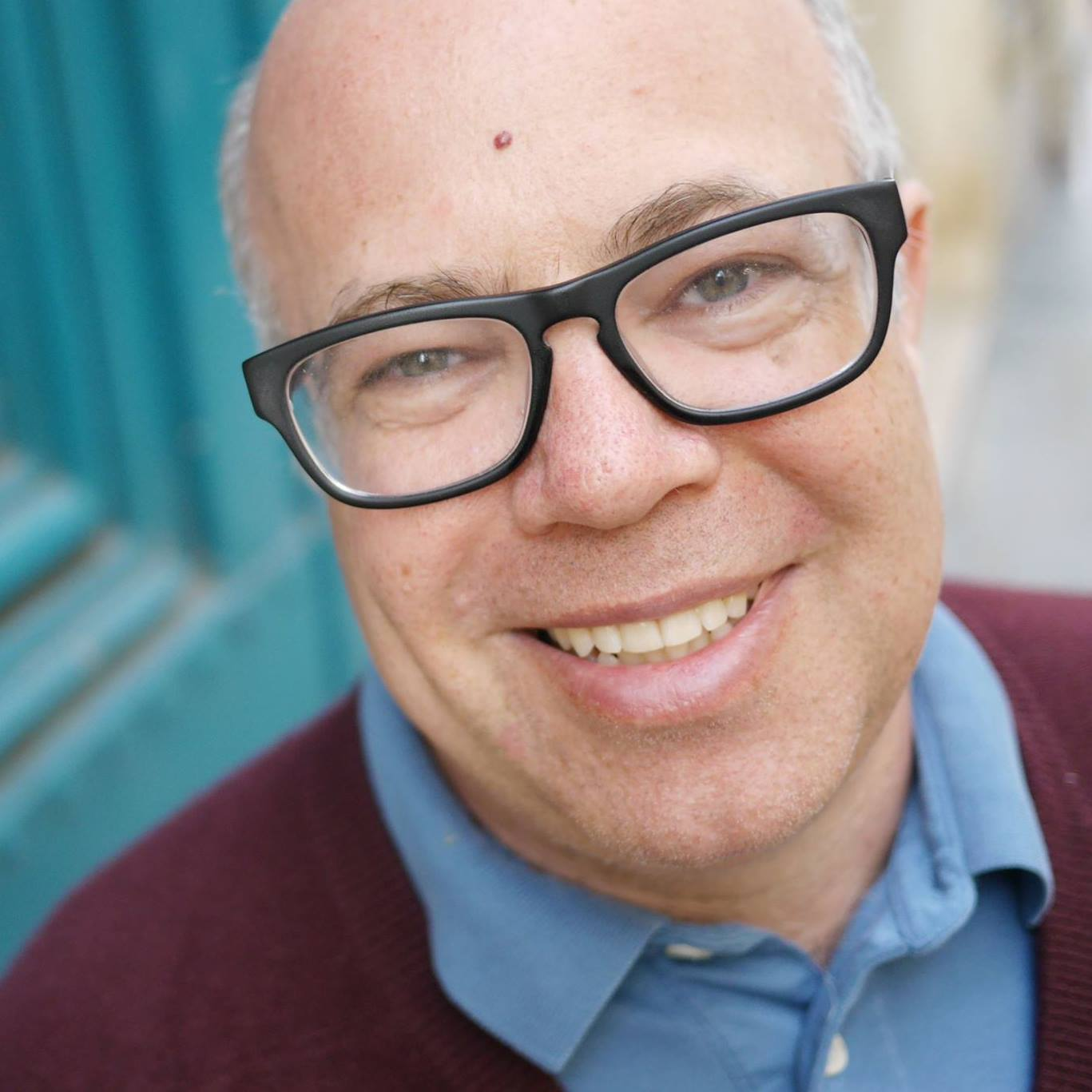
Joshua Freedman, Six Seconds' CEO

The organization publishes EQ tests, including the SEI for adults and the SEI-YV for youth, The SEI in particular has been used in a number of peer-reviewed studies on emotional intelligence. Six Seconds also publishes organizational climate assessments called Vital Signs. Their Chief Executive Officer, Joshua Freedman, has had studies on EQ in publications such as Journal of Leadership Studies, where surveys such as the Six Seconds Emotional Intelligence Assessment were used.

Six Seconds is known for the "Six Seconds Model," a process for putting the skills of emotional intelligence into action.

The organization has had their work referenced by Redbook, O Magazine, and has been featured on Today.

The non-profit supports itself through services in the corporate sector. According to O Magazine, at FedEx many senior managers now use emotional intelligence concepts developed by Six Seconds. Six Seconds has worked with Microsoft, Lockheed Martin, the US Navy and Marine Corps, Make-A-Wish Foundation, Pfizer, American Express, Morgan Stanley, Schlumberger, and Xerox PARC.

Six Seconds maintains a strong focus on school programs and teacher education, with one study indicating that "the Six Seconds model has the potential to positively impact emotional intelligence development in teacher candidates." Six Seconds also created Synapse School, an independent elementary and middle school in Menlo Park, CA, which blends Six Seconds' emotional programs into the curriculum.

The organization participates annually in the United Nations International Day of Tolerance by hosting global 'Talents for Tolerance' workshops geared towards both adults and youth, with the aim of encouraging collaboration on sharing emotional intelligence and calling for a more compassionate, tolerant, and just world. In 2015 the Talents for Tolerance program featured in Nigeria's The Guardian, where the Principal of participating school Editot College, Mrs. Franca Alayo, stated that "if students were sensitized on such programs, it would go a long way in decreasing terrorism, war and unhappy relationships." Another global event, 'Vitality', is a free annual event which invites participants to over 70 free online webinars and seminars by innovative and original thought leaders from around the globe, over the space of five days.

In 2015 Six Seconds partnered with InspirED, a collaboration between Facebook and the Yale Center for Emotional Intelligence which acts as "a portal where educators, community leaders, young people, parents, and government officials can connect to positively impact school climates and the overall well-being of teens in the U.S." Qatar Airways collaborated with Six Seconds in March 2015 to train its Customer Service staff in the benefits of applying emotional intelligence in the workplace. Qatar Airways Senior Vice President, Rossen Dimitrov, said: "Qatar Airways is highly supportive of learning and development and this effective training program will be highly beneficial for our trainers, our staff and ultimately for how we communicate with our customers."
