= Wolfgang Drobetz =

Austrian economist

- Born: February 26, 1971 (age 55)
- Education: University of Hamburg
- Scientific career
- Fields: Finance
- Workplaces: Chair of Corporate and Ship Finance
- Doctoral advisor: Heinz Zimmermann

Wolfgang Drobetz (born February 26, 1971) is an economist at the University of Hamburg. He is known for his work in corporate finance and asset management. He also is in the editor board of the journal Financial Markets and Portfolio Management (FMPM).

== Selected publications ==
- Drobetz, Wolfgang and Pensa, Pascal and Schmid, Markus M. (2007). "Estimating the Cost of Executive Stock Options: Evidence from Switzerland" (PDF). Corporate Governance: An International Review. 15 (5): 797–814. doi:10.1111/j.1467-8683.2007.00612.x.
- Drobetz, W. and Schillhofer, A. and Zimmermann, H. (2004). "Corporate Governance and Expected Stock Returns: Evidence from Germany" (PDF). European Financial Management. 10 (2): 267–293. doi:10.1111/j.1354-7798.2004.00250.x.
- Drobetz, Wolfgang; Wolfgang Bessler; Jörg Seidel (2008). "Ship Funds as a New Asset Class: An Empirical Analysis of the Relationship between Spot and Forward Prices in Freight Markets". Journal of Asset Management. 9 (2): 102–120. doi:10.1057/jam.2008.14. S2CID 153438730.
