= Anabel Jensen =

American educator and author

Dr. Anabel Lee Jensen
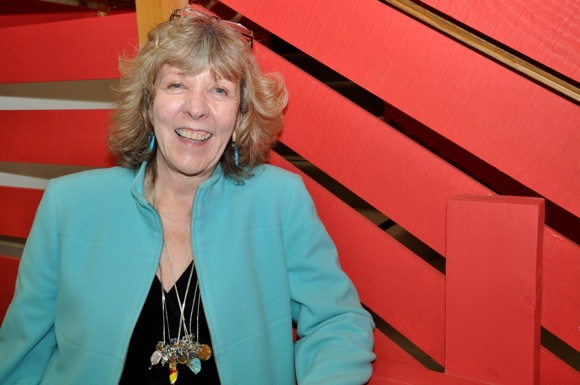
- Citizenship: United States
- Education: Brigham Young University
- Alma mater: University of California, Berkeley
- Occupations: Educator, Businesswoman, Author
- Writing career
- Subjects: Emotional intelligence, Education

Dr. Anabel L. Jensen is an American educator and author best known for her work with curriculum utilizing emotional intelligence. A former director of the Nueva Learning Center in the 1980s and 1990s, she became president of Six Seconds in 1997 and CEO of Synapse School in 2009. She currently is a professor at Notre Dame de Namur University.

== Biography ==
Anabel Lee Jensen, born to two US Army officers who were of Danish descent, began attending Brigham Young University in 1961, and graduated in 1966 with a BA in psychology and a Masters of Education. She received her Ph.D. from the University of California, Berkeley in 1976, where she majored in child development and minored in statistics.

From 1983 to 1997, she was Executive Director of the Nueva Learning Center in California, where she helped develop the "Self-Science" curriculum featured in Daniel Goleman's 1995 book Emotional Intelligence: Why It Can Matter More Than IQ, which helped bring EQ into the mainstream.

In 1997, former Nueva School administrators and teachers Jensen, Karen McCown, Joshua Freedman and Marsha Rideout left the school to found the Six Seconds EQ Network, a non-profit focused on education about EQ. As founding President, she has helped write training programs and psychometric assessments for the organization, including Six Seconds Emotional Intelligence Assessment (SEI) and the Youth Version (SEI-YV).

She co-founded the elementary and middle school Synapse School with Karen Stone-McCown in 2009. As of 2013 she is a full professor at the Notre Dame de Namur University in California, where she teaches psychology to graduate students and is Department Chair of the school's College of Education. She is also a principal advisor to the Gifted Support Center and an advisor for Unite Education.

In 2015, Jensen was named one of the top 100 Women of Influence for 2015 by the Silicon Valley Business Journal for her work in the field of emotional intelligence. She has been interviewed frequently in digital and print publications such as Quartz (2015) and bizjournals.com (2015).

=== Writing career ===
Jensen has authored articles for outlets such as Priorities Magazine and the Discovery Channel, including the 1986 article Greater than the parts: Shared decision making about the Nueva School, in the Roeper Review. The second edition of Self-Science was published in 1998, with Jensen contributing. She published Joy and Loss: The Emotional Lives of Gifted Children with Joshua Freedman in 1999, and the book Emotional Development and Emotional Intelligence: Educational Implications was written based on Jensen providing curriculum access to the writer. In 2010, she published Feeling Smart: Competencies Recommendations and Exercises. She has been a keynote speaker at national conferences on various topics.

== Awards ==
- 1990: Crystal Castle Award for Exceptional Service to the Gifted Community
- 1988/1997: President's National Blue Ribbon Award for Excellence
- 1998: Outstanding Americans
- 1998: Who's Who in American Education
- 2001: Nominated for the National Teacher of the Year Program
- 2001: Keller Teaching Excellence Award, Notre Dame University, Belmont, California
- 2012: Distinguished Service Award, California Association for the Gifted

== Publishing history ==
- 1998: Self-Science: The Emotional Intelligence Curriculum (ISBN 978-0962912344, Six Seconds) - co-author
- 1998: Handle With Care : Emotional Intelligence Activity Book (ISBN 978-0962912320, Six Seconds)
- 1999: Joy and Loss: The Emotional Lives of Gifted Children - co-author
- 2010: Feeling Smart (ISBN 9781935667001, Roeper Review)
