= David Yermack =

American academic

- Education: Harvard University (B.A., Ph.D.); Harvard Business School; Harvard Law School (J.D.)
- Occupation: Professor
- Organization: NYU Stern School of Business
- Spouse: Rocio Aliaga
- Children: 4
- Awards: Albert Fingerhut Professor of Finance and Business Transformation

David Yermack is an American academic who serves as a professor of finance at the New York University Stern School of Business, and adjunct professor of law at New York University School of Law.

His areas of research are corporate governance and law and economics. He has a PhD in business economics from Harvard as well as four further degrees in business and law from Harvard Business School and Harvard Law School.

He has been a visiting professor at the University of Basel, Free University of Berlin, University of Freiburg, Erasmus University Rotterdam, Swedish Institute for Financial Research, London Business School, Mannheim Business School, University of St. Gallen, The University of Western Australia and the University of Zurich.

Yermack is the author of over 17 peer-reviewed papers in finance and economics journals, and the associate editor of the Journal of Financial and Quantitative Analysis, the Journal of Corporate Finance, and Financial Markets and Portfolio Management.
