= Journal of Developmental Entrepreneurship =

- Discipline: Management
- Language: English
- Edited by: Peter Koveos

Publication details
- History: 1996-present
- Publisher: World Scientific (Singapore)
- Frequency: Quarterly

Standard abbreviations
- ISO 4: J. Dev. Entrep.

Indexing
- ISSN: 1084-9467 (print); 1793-706X (web)
- LCCN: 96652914
- OCLC no.: 33230812

Links
- Journal homepage

The Journal of Developmental Entrepreneurship covers research on micro-enterprise and small business development. The journal is published by World Scientific and covers topics such as: entrepreneurship and self-employment in developing contexts, marketing patterns and approaches in venture growth and development, industry practices, and economic and social impacts of micro-enterprise activity.

It is indexed in CSA Human Population & Natural Resource Management, CSA Sustainability Science Abstracts, ABI Inform, and Scopus.
