= Journal of Applied Developmental Psychology =

Psychology journal

The Journal of Applied Developmental Psychology (ISSN 0193-3973) provides a forum for the presentation of conceptual, methodological, policy, and research studies involved in the application of behavioral science research in developmental and life span psychology. The Journal publishes papers from an interdisciplinary perspective focusing on a broad array of social issues ranging from conception to old age.

== Citations ==
- Journal of Applied Developmental Psychology. Journal of Applied Developmental Psychology | ScienceDirect.com by Elsevier. (n.d.). https://www.sciencedirect.com/journal/journal-of-applied-developmental-psychology.
