= Business and Society Review =

- Discipline: Ethical and social issues involving business, government and society
- Language: English
- Edited by: David Wasieleski

Publication details
- Publisher: Wiley-Blackwell
- Frequency: Quarterly

Standard abbreviations
- ISO 4: Bus. Soc. Rev.

Indexing
- CODEN: BUSRAM
- ISSN: 0045-3609 (print); 1467-8594 (web)
- LCCN: 75640253
- OCLC no.: 502987205

Links
- Journal homepage; Online access; Online archive

Business and Society Review is a peer-reviewed academic journal covering ethical issues concerning the relationships between business and society. It is published by Wiley-Blackwell on behalf of The Viragh Institute for Ethics in Business at Duquesne University. The current editor-in-chief is David Wasieleski (Duquesne University). It was founded by Theodore Cross.
