= Workplace resilience =

Capacity to adapt in a workplace

Workplace resilience refers to the capacity of individuals and organizations to adapt to challenges, recover from setbacks, and continue to function effectively in a work environment. It encompasses employees' ability to "bounce back" from stress as well as an organization's systemic capacity to withstand and grow from adversity. The concept is studied in organizational psychology and occupational health, linking personal psychological traits with organizational policies and culture. Developing resilience in the workplace is associated with improved employee well-being and organizational performance.

== Definition and Conceptual Framework ==
Resilience in the workplace has been defined in various ways in academic literature. It is often described as a positive adaptation in the face of significant adversity or risk. For example, one definition characterizes resilience at work as "a pool of positive resources—both individual and collective—that allow organizational systems and their actors to positively adapt while facing adversity". In general, resilience can refer to an individual's ability to recover quickly from setbacks or stressful events. Some scholars conceptualize resilience as an individual trait, referring to stable characteristics like hardiness, while others view it as a dynamic process of adapting over time or as an outcome of successful adaptation. This lack of consensus has led to diverse operational definitions in research.

=== Individual vs. Organizational Resilience ===
Workplace resilience is studied at multiple levels. Individual resilience (often called employee resilience) refers to a worker's personal capacity to cope with job stress and maintain functioning In contrast, organizational resilience refers to the ability of an organization as a whole to anticipate, prepare for, respond and adapt to incremental changes or sudden disruptions, ensuring continuity and growth. Researchers note that individual, team, and organizational resilience, while distinct, share homologous mechanisms (e.g. detecting adversity, sense-making, learning).

== Individual Workplace Resilience ==
=== Psychological Components ===
Individual resilience in the workplace is underpinned by several psychological factors.

- Cognitive flexibility, the mental ability to switch perspectives and think about problems in new ways, is frequently linked to resilience because it helps individuals regulate stress more effectively. Being able to reframe challenges and consider alternative solutions allows resilient employees to navigate workplace setbacks.
- Emotional regulation is another key component – resilient individuals can manage their emotional responses to pressure or failure, maintaining composure and focus. Research indicates that the capacity to self-regulate one's emotions under stress is one of the most important attributes associated with resilience.
- Self-efficacy, the belief in one's ability to handle tasks and challenges, is also positively correlated with resilience. Employees with high self-efficacy view difficult assignments as achievable and are more likely to persevere; studies suggest that building self-efficacy can improve resilience levels. In sum, a resilient worker often demonstrates confidence in their abilities, a positive and flexible mindset, and control over their emotional reactions to workplace stress.

=== Physiological Aspects ===
Resilience has a physiological dimension related to how the body handles stress. When faced with acute stressors (e.g. urgent deadlines or conflicts), resilient individuals tend to experience a typical "fight-or-flight" stress response but recover to baseline more quickly afterwards. This efficient recovery involves the nervous system and hormonal system calming down – for instance, heart rate and blood pressure returning to normal and stress hormone (cortisol) levels stabilizing. The ability to maintain or restore internal homeostasis is often cited as part of resilience. Some research in occupational health finds that resilience is associated with lower physiological markers of chronic stress (such as fewer stress-related health complaints or better sleep quality). In essence, resilient employees not only cope mentally but also exhibit adaptive physical stress responses, reducing the long-term wear-and-tear that workplace pressures can inflict on the body.

=== Skills and Competencies of Resilient Workers ===
Resilient employees typically display a repertoire of competencies that enable them to navigate workplace challenges effectively. These include: adaptability (readiness to adjust to new conditions or changes in job demands), problem-solving skills, social competence under pressure and realistic optimism. They tend to remain composed and resourceful during crises. For instance, resilient individuals can prioritize tasks and make decisions even when circumstances are chaotic, rather than becoming paralyzed by stress. In practice, such competencies mean resilient workers maintain productivity and morale even when workloads are heavy or when they experience failures, and they can serve as stabilizing forces in their teams.

== Organizational Resilience ==
Organizational resilience refers to the capacity of an organization (as a system) to survive, adapt, and thrive in the face of business disruptions or significant change. Structurally, this involves formal policies, procedures, and resources dedicated to managing risk and uncertainty.

=== Structural Elements ===
Resilient organizations often engage in contingency planning and crisis management protocols – for example, having disaster recovery plans, backup systems, or flexible operational processes that can be quickly adjusted during emergencies. They invest in redundancies (spare capacity in systems) and robust infrastructure to prevent single points of failure. Research in management suggests that resilience at the organizational level results from processes that build and retain a reservoir of resources (cognitive, emotional, relational, financial, etc.) that can be drawn upon in times of crisis. This means companies cultivate flexible resources and capabilities (sometimes termed adaptive capacity) that enable effective responses.

Continuous monitoring of the internal and external environment is another structural aspect – resilient organizations detect early signs of trouble and respond before issues escalate. For example, high-reliability organizations (like in aviation or nuclear power) practice constant vigilance and simulations of potential failures, which improves their ability to contain and recover from unexpected events. In summary, structures such as clear emergency procedures, cross-training employees for multiple roles, decentralized decision-making during crises, and maintaining financial buffers all contribute to organizational resilience.

=== Cultural Elements ===
Beyond formal structures, an organization's culture significantly influences its resilience. Workplace culture encompasses shared values, norms, and practices – and a resilience-enhancing culture is one that promotes flexibility, trust, and learning.

- Psychological safety: The extent to which employees feel safe to speak up about problems or mistakes without fear of punishment. A culture of psychological safety encourages early reporting of issues and collaborative problem-solving, which helps the organization address challenges before they worsen. Supportive and open communication from management fosters trust, so employees know they will be backed when taking initiative or adapting their approach.
- Learning culture: Resilient organizations treat failures and near-misses as opportunities to learn and improve, rather than blaming individuals. This attitude, sometimes described as "intelligent wariness" or a "preoccupation with failure," is observed in high-reliability organizations that constantly refine their processes to prevent catastrophe.
- Agility and innovation: They support resilience by enabling creative responses to new problems.
- Employee well-being: A culture that prioritizes worker well-being (through work-life balance policies, wellness programs, etc.) tends to produce a more resilient workforce that can handle stress.

=== Team Dynamics and Collective Resilience ===
Resilience can also be understood at the team or workgroup level. Team resilience is the ability of a group of colleagues to collectively respond to pressure, bounce back from setbacks, and remain cohesive and effective. Key aspects of team resilience include collective efficacy (the team's shared belief that they can accomplish goals and manage challenges), good communication, and mutual support among team members. Researchers have observed that the mechanisms of team resilience parallel those of individual resilience – for example, teams engage in joint problem-solving (analogous to an individual's cognitive flexibility) and emotional support (akin to individual emotional regulation).

== Measuring Workplace Resilience ==
=== Assessment Tools and Scales ===
Measuring resilience in the workplace is complex, and many assessment instruments have been developed. In general, resilience is measured through self-report questionnaires that evaluate attitudes, behaviors, and abilities related to coping with adversity. Commonly used measures include the Connor–Davidson Resilience Scale (CD-RISC), a 25-item scale initially developed to assess resilience in clinical and general populations; it has also been applied to employees to gauge how well they bounce back from stress. The Brief Resilience Scale (BRS) is a shorter instrument (6 items) focusing on the ability to recover from setbacks. In occupational settings, specialized scales have emerged: for example, the Resilience at Work (RAW) Scale, a 20-item measure that covers workplace-specific resilience factors (such as handling workplace change, networking, and staying healthy under pressure). Another is the Employee Resilience (EmpRes) scale developed by industrial/organizational psychologists, which assesses the capacity of employees to utilize resources and adapt within their work environment.

=== Limitations of Current Measures ===
Measuring resilience poses several challenges. First, the lack of a single agreed-upon definition of resilience means different scales may be capturing different concepts. One scale might emphasize emotional stability, while another focuses on social support or problem-solving, making results not directly comparable. Most resilience instruments rely on self-reported perceptions, which can be subjective and prone to bias (e.g., some individuals might overestimate or underestimate their resilience). Moreover, many studies measuring workplace resilience are cross-sectional, capturing a snapshot at one time; this approach cannot easily distinguish between a generally resilient disposition and a temporary state. Scholars have noted the need for more longitudinal measures – tracking the same individuals over time – to observe how resilience develops or fluctuates during actual adversity.

== Benefits of Workplace Resilience ==
High levels of resilience in the workplace have been linked to a range of positive outcomes for both employees and organizations.

Employee well-being and mental health: Resilience serves as a protective factor against stress-related problems. Workers who score higher on resilience tend to report lower levels of stress, anxiety, and depression even in high-strain job environments. For example, a study of employees in demanding jobs found that those with high resilience experienced fewer burnout symptoms and better sleep quality than their less resilient counterparts.

Performance and productivity: There is evidence that resilient employees maintain higher job performance under pressure. By staying focused and effective when facing obstacles, these workers prevent drops in productivity that might otherwise accompany stress. In one study, resilience (defined as using positive mental skills to stay steady under adversity) substantially influenced how well employees could perform their duties during challenges. Resilient individuals often find ways to meet goals despite setbacks – for instance, they might quickly devise a workaround if a project encounters problems, thereby meeting deadlines. Additionally, resilience is associated with higher work engagement (the sense of vigor, dedication, and absorption in work)

Employee retention and engagement: Resilience has been correlated with greater job satisfaction and lower intentions to quit. Employees who handle workplace challenges well are less likely to feel overwhelmed or hopeless in their roles, which in turn makes them more likely to stay with their employer. Studies indicate that when employees have good resilience, their turnover intention (desire to leave the job) is lower. This is partly because resilient employees experience less burnout and more achievement, factors which increase commitment to the organization. Moreover, resilience often goes hand-in-hand with traits like optimism and proactive problem-solving that make for a more positive work experience. Work engagement is also higher among resilient employees – they view difficulties as challenges to overcome rather than insurmountable threats, sustaining their motivation.

Organizational adaptability: On a broader scale, fostering resilience contributes to an organization's ability to navigate change and disruption. In an era of rapid market shifts, technological change, and unforeseen crises (such as economic downturns or pandemics), organizations with resilient employees and resilient processes are more adaptable. Organizational resilience also means the company can recover faster from setbacks – such as rebounding after a failed product launch or quickly restoring services after a systems outage – often emerging stronger or more innovative than before.

== Developing Workplace Resilience ==
Given the advantages of resilience, many organizations and professionals seek ways to build resilience at both the individual and organizational levels.

=== Evidence-based Interventions and Programs ===
A variety of resilience training programs have been developed, drawing from fields like positive psychology, cognitive-behavioral therapy (CBT), and stress management. Meta-analyses of resilience-building interventions show that these programs can have a moderate positive impact on improving individual resilience. Mindfulness-based stress reduction (MBSR) workshops, where employees learn meditation and breathing techniques and peer mentorship programs or team-building exercises may foster workplace resilience.

=== Organizational Strategies and Policies ===
Developing resilience is not only an individual endeavor; organizations can take systemic steps to bolster resilience. One strategy is to create support systems for employees – for example, Employee Assistance Programs (EAPs) that provide counseling and resources for dealing with personal or work-related difficulties. Organizations can implement policies that mitigate excessive stress, such as reasonable working hour limits, flexible work arrangements, or ensured rest breaks, which help prevent burnout and build a foundation for resilience. Training for managers is also important: if managers are trained to recognize signs of stress and to respond supportively (rather than punitively) when employees struggle, the workforce feels safer and more supported, which encourages resilient behavior. Another organizational approach is fostering a mentoring or buddy system, where less experienced employees are paired with veterans who can coach them through challenges. Creating opportunities for regular reflection and debriefing can institutionalize learning from setbacks (for example, after a project crisis, holding a "lessons learned" meeting to discuss what went wrong and how to improve).

== Criticisms and Limitations ==
Despite its positive connotations, the concept of workplace resilience is not without criticism and potential downsides. One major concern is the overemphasis on individual responsibility for coping with adversity, sometimes at the expense of addressing systemic problems. Critics argue that some organizations might promote resilience training for employees while neglecting to fix toxic work conditions or excessive demands. Scholars have cautioned against conceptualizing resilience as solely an individual trait or responsibility, as this perspective can lead to harmful consequences in the workplace. For example, an employee who cannot handle extreme stress might be unfairly seen as "not resilient enough," diverting attention from the fact that the work environment may be unsustainably demanding. In the long run, institutionalizing resilience without parallel systemic improvements could normalize high stress levels and discourage employees from speaking up about legitimate issues.

Cultural and contextual limitations: The concept of resilience, as developed in Western psychological literature, may not fully translate to all cultures or contexts. Different cultures have varying ways of interpreting adversity and coping. For instance, in more collectivist cultures, resilience might be seen as a community or family attribute rather than an individual one – people draw resilience from group support and shared values. Western measures of resilience that focus on individual confidence or emotional expression might miss these aspects.

Ethical considerations: Building and expecting resilience in employees raises some ethical questions. One issue is normalization of stress – resilience discourse often talks about maintaining "functioning" despite adversity. If taken to an extreme, this can imply that employees should function normally no matter what happens, potentially minimizing the legitimacy of their stress reactions or mental health needs. There is a subtle but important difference between helping people cope and implying they must always cope without fail. Critics like sociologist Mark Neocleous have suggested that the modern emphasis on resilience carries a "neoliberal" tinge – shifting the burden of dealing with societal or organizational shortcomings onto individuals, thus depoliticizing issues that should be addressed by changes in policy or structure.
