= Journal of Marketing Management =

Academic journal established 1985

- Discipline: Marketing
- Language: English
- Edited by: Mark Tadajewski

Publication details
- History: 1985–present
- Publisher: Routledge
- Frequency: 18/year
- Open access: Hybrid
- Impact factor: 3.5 (2023)

Standard abbreviations
- ISO 4: J. Mark. Manag.

Indexing
- ISSN: 0267-257X (print); 1472-1376 (web)

Links
- Journal homepage; Current issue; Online archive

The Journal of Marketing Management is a peer-reviewed academic journal covering the field of marketing. The journal is owned by Westburn Publishers and published by Routledge. The editor-in-chief is Mark Tadajewski (University of York). It is the official journal of the United Kingdom’s Academy of Marketing and was established in 1985 by Michael J. Baker (University of Strathclyde).

== Abstracting and indexing ==
The journal is abstracted and indexed in Scopus and the Social Sciences Citation Index. According to the Journal Citation Reports, its 2023 impact factor is 3.5.
