= Information and Organization =

- Discipline: Business and management, information systems
- Language: English
- Edited by: Michael Barrett

Publication details
- History: 2001–present
- Impact factor: 6.3 (2022)

Standard abbreviations
- ISO 4: Inf. Organ.

Indexing
- ISSN: 1471-7727

Links
- Journal homepage

Information and Organization is an academic journal related to the relationship between ICT and different social consequences experienced by different individuals, stakeholders and societies. Empirical research and relevant theories are published in this journal, while some future research directions in the same area are also offered.

Currently, Information and Organization is being listed as A* under the academic journal list of Australian Business Dean Council (ABDC).
