= Journal of Purchasing and Supply Management =

- Language: English

Publication details
- Former names: European Journal of Purchasing & Supply Management
- History: 1994–present
- Publisher: Elsevier
- Frequency: Quarterly
- Impact factor: 6.1 (2022)

Standard abbreviations
- ISO 4: J. Purch. Supply Manag.

Indexing
- ISSN: 1478-4092
- OCLC no.: 1034321669

Links
- Journal homepage

The Journal of Purchasing and Supply Management is a quarterly peer-reviewed academic journal published by Elsevier. It covers research in the field of purchasing and supply management. The journal also publishes a yearly special issue containing selected papers from the annual meeting of the International Purchasing & Supply Education & Research Association. It was established in 1994 as the European Journal of Purchasing & Supply Management. The editors-in-chief are Louise Knight and Wendy Tate. Previous editors are Alessandro Ancarani and George A. Zsidisin, Finn Wynstra, Christine Harland, and the founding editor, Richard Lamming.

== Abstracting and indexing ==
The journal is abstracted and indexed by Scopus and the Social Sciences Citation Index.
