= Journal of Business Strategy =

- Discipline: Business strategy
- Language: English
- Edited by: Pierre Dal Zotto

Publication details
- History: 1980–present
- Publisher: Emerald Group Publishing
- Frequency: Bimonthly
- Open access: Hybrid

Standard abbreviations
- ISO 4: J. Bus. Strategy

Indexing
- ISSN: 0275-6668 (print); 2052-1197 (web)
- LCCN: 81640340
- OCLC no.: 300026735

Links
- Journal homepage; Online access

The Journal of Business Strategy is a bimonthly peer-reviewed academic journal published by Emerald Group Publishing, covering the field of business strategy, including strategic management, organizational leadership, and competitive analysis. It was established in 1980 The editor-in-chief is Pierre Dal Zotto (Grenoble Ecole de Management).

== Abstracting and indexing ==
The journal is abstracted and indexed in:

- ABI/INFORM
- EBSCO databases
- ProQuest databases
- Scopus

== Notable articles ==
Over the years, the journal published several influential articles that have shaped the discourse in business strategy. Notable contributions include:

- Aaker, D.A. (1992). "The Value of Brand Equity". Journal of Business Strategy. 13 (4): 27–32. doi:10.1108/eb039503.
- Allee, V. (2000). "Reconfiguring the Value Network". Journal of Business Strategy. 21 (4): 36–39. doi:10.1108/eb040103.
- Hofer, C.W. (1980). "Turnaround Strategies". Journal of Business Strategy. 1 (1): 19–31. doi:10.1108/eb038886.
- Miller, D. (1992). "The Generic Strategy Trap". Journal of Business Strategy. 13 (1): 37–41. doi:10.1108/eb039467. PMID 10116009.
- Porter, M.E. (1985). "Technology and Competitive Advantage". Journal of Business Strategy. 5 (3): 60–78. doi:10.1108/eb039075.
