= The Journal of Risk =

The Journal of Risk is a bimonthly peer-reviewed academic journal covering financial risk management. It was established in 1999 and is published by Incisive Risk Information. The editor-in-chief is Farid AitSahlia (University of Florida). According to the Journal Citation Reports, the journal has a 2016 impact factor of 0.375.
