= Pi Sigma Epsilon =

American professional fraternity for marketing

- ΠΣΕ
- Founded: May 14, 1952; 74 years ago Georgia State University
- Type: Professional
- Affiliation: PFA
- Status: Active
- Emphasis: Marketing and Sales Management
- Scope: National
- Colors: Amethyst and Gold
- Publication: Journal of Personal Selling & Sales Management
- Chapters: 58
- Headquarters: 4811 S 76th Street; Greenfield, Wisconsin 53220; United States
- Website: www.pse.org

Pi Sigma Epsilon (ΠΣΕ) is a professional fraternity for students and industry professionals in marketing and management. It was founded in 1952 at Georgia State University.

== History ==
Pi Sigma Epsilon was founded at Georgia State University, then Atlanta Division of the University of Georgia) in the fall of 1951. Educator and businessman Lloyd Antle proposed the idea of a professional fraternity for the fields of marketing, sales management, and selling. Antle's concept was advanced by Henry G. Baker and William G. Harris from the college and Lewis F. Gordon, a founder of the Atlanta Sales Executives Club.

The first organizational meeting was on November 1, 1951. At that meeting, the Pi Sigma Epsilon's purpose was established:

To create a collegiate brotherhood of men who are interested in the advancement of marketing, sales management, and selling as a career and a profession; to promote the study of marketing, sales management, selling and related subjects in colleges and universities; to bring together academically qualified students who express a desire to enter these career fields; to encourage in colleges and universities the establishing of courses preparing men for such careers; to stimulate research and improved methods and techniques in these fields; to install in its members the highest possible ethical standards of the profession.

Alpha chapter was established at the college on June 2, 1952.

Pi Sigma Epsilon is a member of the Professional Fraternity Association. Its headquarters are in Greenfield, Wisconsin. The fraternity's publication is the Journal of Personal Selling & Sales Management.

== Symbols ==
Pi Sigma Epsilon's colors are amethyst and gold.

== Chapters ==
Pi Sigma Epsilon has chartered 58 chapters.

== See also ==
- Professional fraternities and sororities
