= Diane Mollenkopf =

New Zealand academic

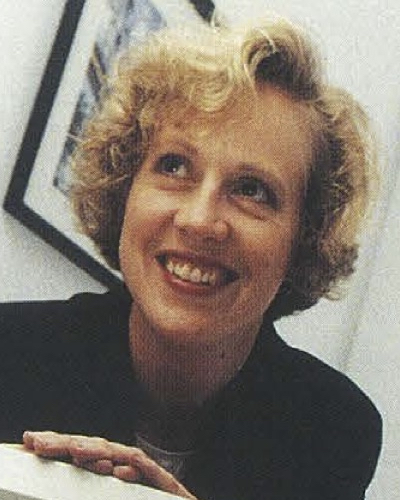
- Mollenkopf in 1997

Academic background
- Education: Bowling Green State University, Michigan State University, Drexel University
- Thesis: A study of the market orientation and technology orientation of wholesaler-distributors and dominant retail buyers (1995)

Diane Agnes Mollenkopf is Professor of Supply Chain Management at the University of Canterbury in New Zealand. She has researched product returns and the circular economy.

== Academic career ==
Mollenkopf completed a BSB at Bowling Green State University, during which time she spent a year at L'Institute de Touraine in France. She then spent ten years in the cosmetics industry as a logistics and product manager.

Mollenkopf completed an MBA at Michigan State University, followed by a PhD on marketing channels at Drexel University. Her 1995 thesis was titled A study of the market orientation and technology orientation of wholesaler-distributors and dominant retail buyers.

Mollenkopf spent almost ten years as a lecturer and senior lecturer at Lincoln University in New Zealand, before spending three years at Michigan State University and 14 years at the University of Tennessee, where she was the McCormick Professor of Logistics. She relocated back to New Zealand in 2019, to the University of Canterbury, where she was promoted to full professor in 2021. Mollenkopf works on food security, logistics strategy and sustainable supply chains. Commenting on the supply chain issues involved in the recycling of soft plastics in Dunedin, which had been paused for a year, Mollenkopf said that "plastics recycling was now regarded as a 'moral norm'", and that the challenge for the industry was in maintaining the infrastructure to meet consumer demand.

== Selected works ==
- Mollenkopf, Diane; Hannah Stolze; Wendy L. Tate; Monique Ueltschy (2010). "Green, lean, and global supply chains". International Journal of Physical Distribution & Logistics Management. 40 (1/2): 14–41. doi:10.1108/09600031011018028. Wikidata Q118212915.
- Mollenkopf, Diane; Robert Frankel; Ivan Russo (2011). "Creating value through returns management: Exploring the marketing–operations interface". Journal of Operations Management. 29 (5): 391–403. doi:10.1016/j.jom.2010.11.004. Wikidata Q118212914.
- Mollenkopf, Diane; Ivan Russo; Robert Frankel (2007). "The returns management process in supply chain strategy". International Journal of Physical Distribution & Logistics Management. 37 (7): 568–592. doi:10.1108/09600030710776482. Wikidata Q118212913.
- Mollenkopf, Diane; Elliot Rabinovich; Timothy M. Laseter; Kenneth K. Boyer (2007). "Managing Internet Product Returns: A Focus on Effective Service Operations". Decision Sciences. 38 (2): 215–250. doi:10.1111/j.1540-5915.2007.00157.x. Wikidata Q60145398.
- Hazen, Benjamin; Mollenkopf, Diane; Yacan Wang (2016). "Remanufacturing for the Circular Economy: An Examination of Consumer Switching Behavior". Business Strategy and the Environment. 26 (4): 451–464. doi:10.1002/bse.1929. Wikidata Q58232136.
