= Mariliz Pereira Jorge =

Brazilian journalist

Mariliz Pereira Jorge (Ponta Grossa, 1972) is a Brazilian feminist, journalist and social critic. Jorge is an alumna of the State University of Ponta Grossa and has completed graduate studies in international relations and nutrition. She has held positions as a reporter with magazines Veja, Marie Claire and VIP, among others, as well as newspaper Folha de S.Paulo. She has also worked as an editor and screenwriter for Rede Globo's Encontro com Fátima Bernardes and Fantástico. Jorge was the editor of Revista da Folha from 2006 to 2007. She is currently a columnist for Folha de S.Paulo's online edition.

== Critic of Jair Bolsonaro's government ==
Jorge has earned notoriety in Brazil as a steady critic of Jair Bolsonaro's government as well as of his supporters. She considers Bolsonaro to be the 'bitterest pill Brazilians need to swallow so they will never again glorify politicians (despite the aversion that they claim to have against these), or make them into myths [the word "myth" is often used by Bolsonaro's supporters to designate him].'

In one text, Jorge decries Bolsonaro's repudiation of science and his public endorsement of chloroquine. She points to Bolsonaro's supporters' complaints against the Establishment, noting 'What would it be like for them if they realised that, as a matter of fact, they are indeed the Establishment?'

She expresses consternation at the fact that Bolsonaros's far-right supporters have kidnapped Brazil's national symbols such as its flag and anthem, saying however 'There's still time to turn the tables.'

== Defender of women's rights ==
Jorge's weekly column also addresses issues related to women's rights and women's empowerment.

In a country where a mere 16% of the population can be considered pro-choice, Jorge has called for legal, universal and free abortion procedures. She claims Brazilian politicians are ill-prepared to face the electorate with such an unpopular agenda but says enough of hypocrisy.

Writing about toxic relationships and being demeaned by a male partner (based on personal experiences shared publicly by Lady Gaga), Jorge says: 'To me and to most girls who have gone through the same ordeal, the best revenge is to be unsparingly happy by being exactly the person you are. Look at that. But to imagine my ex's face every time he stumbles upon my name on Folha's homepage—his favourite newspaper—makes me happy like I won an Oscar.'

As regards her and her husband's option to remain childless, she asserts: 'I don't have to be a mother in order to be happy and complete. And by paying attention to others, I realised having children is not for everyone.' And: 'No woman is born to be a mother, as much as they would have you believe otherwise. Women are born to be whatever they want.'

Jorge has also criticised Rosangela Moro, Sergio Moro's wife, for downplaying feminism, by saying Moro was not aware of feminists' involvement in the fight against domestic violence, a serious issue in the country whose minister of justice at the time was no less than Moro's own husband.
