= Quarterly Journal of Finance =

Academic journal about finance

- Discipline: Finance
- Language: English
- Edited by: David Feldman

Publication details
- History: 2011–present
- Publisher: World Scientific
- Frequency: Quarterly
- Impact factor: 0.9 (2023)

Standard abbreviations
- ISO 4: Q. J. Finance

Indexing
- ISSN: 2010-1392 (print); 2010-1406 (web)
- OCLC no.: 739260678

Links
- Journal homepage

Quarterly Journal of Finance is a quarterly peer-reviewed academic journal published by World Scientific on behalf of the Midwest Finance Association. It was established in 2011 and publishes papers on finance. According to the Journal Citation Reports, the journal has a 2023 impact factor of 0.9.
