= Central Brasileira de Notícias =

Brazilian news radio network

Coordinates: 22°55′21″S 42°10′26″W

- Type: Broadcast radio network
- Country: Brazil
- Headquarters: São Paulo, São Paulo

Programming
- Language(s): Portuguese

Ownership
- Owner: Grupo Globo
- Parent: Sistema Globo de Rádio

History
- Launch date: 1 October 1991
- Former names: Rádio Mundial, Rádio Excelsior

Links
- Webcast: Listen live
- Website: cbn.globoradio.globo.com

Central Brasileira de Notícias (English: Brazilian News Center), or Rádio CBN for short, is a Brazilian news radio network, jointly owned by Sistema Globo de Rádio (Grupo Globo's radio division). It was created on 1 October 1991 as the first all news project on FM radio in Brazil, and broadcast news 24 hours a day.

Nowadays, Rádio CBN has four owned-and-operated stations in the cities of Rio de Janeiro, São Paulo, Belo Horizonte and Brasília. It also has 40 affiliate stations throughout the country.

Since its creation, CBN's slogan has been "A rádio que toca notícia" (The radio that plays the news). Its anchor journalists are Bianca Santos, Carolina Morand, Carlos Alberto Sardenberg, Carlos Eduardo Éboli, Cássia Godoy, Debora Freitas, Fernando Andrade, Leandro Resende, Milton Jung, Tania Morales, Tatiana Vasconcellos, etc. The company employs more than 200 other journalists.

== Programming ==
CBN broadcasts two- to three-minute summaries, which provides the day's five key news stories and some notable sports stories, every half an hour, under the banner Repórter CBN. Seven standard hard news strands of the current schedule are CBN Madrugada, CBN Primeiras Noticias, Jornal da CBN, CBN Brasil, Estúdio CBN, Ponto Final CBN and CBN Noite Total. At week some or all of it is taken up by live commentary of football matches. Other sport shows include Quatro em Campo and CBN Esportes. On weekend lunchtime the news review programme Revista CBN is broadcast. Other program an weekends is CBN Show da Notícia. O Mundo em Meia Hora presents the week's key international stories, and how they affect Brazilians. CBN Praça presents the local news. Weekend, all friday's, Fim de Expediente bring in relaxed way the news of week with special guests. Also are presents CBN AutoEsporte about motors and Bem-Estar em Movimento about health.

== Owned-and-operated stations ==
- São Paulo: ZYD800 - FM 90.5 MHz (flagship)
- Rio de Janeiro: ZYD464 - FM 92.5 MHz
- Belo Horizonte: ZYC733 - FM 106.1 MHz (licensed to Caeté)
- Brasília: ZYC480 - FM 95.3 MHz
