= Philippe Jorion =

Risk management academic (1955–2025)

- Born: July 15, 1955; Brussels, Belgium
- Died: July 21, 2025 (aged 70); California, U.S.
- Occupations: Author; Professor of Finance, Risk Manager
- Notable work: Value at Risk, Financial Risk Management Handbook, Big Bets Gone Bad

Philippe Jorion (1955—2025) was an author, professor and risk manager. He was the author of more than 100 publications on the topic of risk management and international finance, and is credited with pioneering the Value at Risk approach to risk management.

Jorion's works include Financial Risk Manager Handbook and Value at Risk: The New Benchmark for Managing Financial Risk. He served as the Chancellor’s Professor of Finance at the UC Irvine Paul Merage School of Business and was a managing director at investment firm PAAMCO where he headed the Risk Management group. In 1995, he wrote the book Big Bets Gone Bad on the bankruptcy of Orange County, California, hoping to push voters towards supporting a proposed upcoming tax increase in the region, but the work's publication date was pushed past the special election.

Jorion received several awards honoring excellence in research and financial writing, including two from the CFA Institute and one from the Journal of Finance. He held an MBA and a PhD from the University of Chicago and a degree in engineering from ULB Brussels.
