= Marjolein Lips-Wiersma =

New Zealand academic

Marjolein Silvia Lips-Wiersma
- Education: University of Auckland
- Scientific career
- Fields: Meaningful Work, Sustainability, Hope
- Workplaces: Canterbury University, Auckland University of Technology
- Thesis: The influence of 'spiritual meaning-making' on career choice, transition and experience (1999)

Marjolein Silvia Lips-Wiersma is a New Zealand academic. She specializes in ethics, meaningful work and sustainability. She is currently a full professor at the Auckland University of Technology.

== Academic career ==
Marjo Lips-Wiersma is Professor of Ethics and Sustainability Leadership at AUT. In 1999 she submitted a doctoral thesis titled The influence of 'spiritual meaning-making' on career choice, transition and experience at the University of Auckland. Her research takes place at the nexus of meaningful work, sustainability, hope and well-being.

Lips-Wiersma is amongst the top 2 % of global academics. Her research on meaningful work is well known. It is also used in a variety of organisations around the world and she is co-founder and member of the board of the board of the Map of Meaning (https://www.themapofmeaning.org) which, through training and certifying practitioners, helps individuals, organisations and communities to make meaning practical while honouring individual and community dignity and autonomy.

Lips-Wiersma has published in journals such as Human Relations, Organization Studies, the Journal of Business Ethics, the Journal of Organizational Behavior, the Journal of Management Studies, Leadership Quarterly, Group & Organization Management and the Journal of Management Inquiry. She has teaches sustainability, responsible leadership and qualitative research methods at postgraduate and MBA levels.

== Selected works ==
- Lips-Wiersma, Marjolein, and Lani Morris. "Discriminating between ‘meaningful work’and the ‘management of meaning’." Journal of Business Ethics 88, no. 3 (2009): 491-511.
- Algera, Puck M., and Marjolein Lips-Wiersma. "Radical authentic leadership: Co-creating the conditions under which all members of the organization can be authentic." The Leadership Quarterly 23, no. 1 (2012): 118–131.
- Lips-Wiersma, Marjolein. "The influence of spiritual “meaning-making” on career behavior." Journal of Management Development 21, no. 7 (2002): 497-520.
- Lips‐Wiersma, Marjolein, and Douglas T. Hall. "Organizational career development is not dead: A case study on managing the new career during organizational change." Journal of Organizational Behavior: The International Journal of Industrial, Occupational and Organizational Psychology and Behavior 28, no. 6 (2007): 771–792.
- Lips-Wiersma, Marjolein, and Colleen Mills. "Coming out of the closet: Negotiating spiritual expression in the workplace." Journal of managerial Psychology 17, no. 3 (2002): 183–202.
