= Journal of Personal Selling & Sales Management =

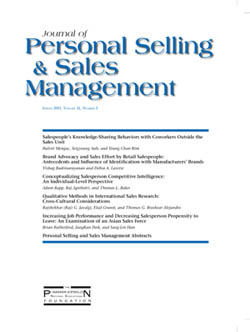
- Discipline: Sales management
- Language: English
- Edited by: Douglas E. Hughes

Publication details
- History: 1980–present
- Publisher: M. E. Sharpe on behalf of the Pi Sigma Epsilon (United States)
- Frequency: Quarterly

Standard abbreviations
- ISO 4: J. Pers. Sell. Sales Manag.

Indexing
- ISSN: 0885-3134 (print); 1557-7813 (web)
- JSTOR: 08853134
- OCLC no.: 7410012

Links
- Journal homepage

The Journal of Personal Selling & Sales Management is a peer-reviewed academic journal covering research on marketing. All submissions undergo double-blind peer review. The journal was established in 1980. Topics covered include sales force motivation, compensation, performance and evaluation, buyer-seller-relationships, team selling, account management, effectiveness of selling approaches, and technology in selling. The journal is published by M. E. Sharpe on behalf of the Pi Sigma Epsilon National Education Foundation.

== Abstracting and indexing ==
The journal is abstracted and indexed in Business Source Premier, ProQuest, PsycINFO, and Scopus.

== Editors ==
The following person have been editors-in-chief of the journal:

- 2017-... Douglas Hughes, Michigan State University
- 2014-2016 Manfred Krafft, University of Münster
- 2011-2013 Michael Ahearne, University of Houston
- 2009-2010 James Boles, Georgia State University
- 2006-2008 Kenneth Evans, University of Missouri
- 2002-2005 Greg Marshall, Oklahoma State University
- 1999-2001 Jeffery Sager, University of North Texas
- 1996-1998 Alan Dubinsky, Metropolitan State University
- 1993-1995 Ronald Michaels, Indiana University
- 1991-1992 Thomas Ingram, Memphis State University
- 1988-1990 Lawrence Chonko, Baylor University
- 1985-1987 Thomas Wotruba, San Diego State University
- 1982-1985 Marvin Jolson, University of Maryland
- 1980-1981 Edwin Simpson, Miami University
