= International Journal of Physical Distribution & Logistics Management =

- Discipline: Supply chain management, logistics
- Language: English
- Edited by: Ivan Russo, Shashank Rao

Publication details
- Former names: International Journal of Physical Distribution; International Journal of Physical Distribution & Materials Management
- History: 1970–present
- Publisher: Emerald Group Publishing
- Frequency: 10/year
- Impact factor: 5.9 (2023)

Standard abbreviations
- ISO 4: Int. J. Phys. Distrib. Logist. Manag.

Indexing
- ISSN: 0960-0035 (print); 1758-664X (web)
- LCCN: 90-660242
- OCLC no.: 21987179

Links
- Journal homepage

The International Journal of Physical Distribution & Logistics Management is a peer-reviewed academic journal which focuses on business logistics, supply chain management, physical distribution, and marketing channels. It was established in 1970, and is published ten times per year by Emerald Group Publishing.

== History ==
The journal was established in 1970 as the International Journal of Physical Distribution (ISSN 0020-7527). A monograph series called PDM Physical Distribution Monograph (ISSN 0305-2214) was also established at that time; in 1974 its title was changed to IJPD Monograph (ISSN 0308-4264), and in 1975 it was incorporated into the journal. In 1977 the journal's title was changed to International Journal of Physical Distribution and Materials Management (ISSN 0269-8218), and in 1990 the current title was adopted.

Volumes are numbered by year, but the number of issues per volume has varied. The first two volumes had only 3 issues, but volumes 3-7 had 6 issues each. The journal has had 10 issues per volume since v.35 (2005), although in some of those volumes there have been combined issues. Content is available online from Emerald Insight or, after a 12-month embargo, from ABI/INFORM Complete.

The editors-in-chief are Ivan Russo (University of Verona) and Shashank Rao (Auburn University).

== Abstracting and indexing ==
The journal is abstracted and indexed in the following databases:

- ABI/INFORM Complete
- Academic Onefile
- Business Insights: Essentials
- Business Source Premier
- Research Library Complete
- Scopus
- Social Sciences Citation Index

According to the "Journal Citation Reports" the journal has a 2023 impact factor of 5.9.
