= International Marketing Review =

- Discipline: International marketing
- Language: English
- Edited by: Jeryl Whitelock, John Cadogan

Publication details
- History: 1983-present
- Publisher: Emerald Group Publishing
- Frequency: Bimonthly
- Impact factor: 5.0 (2022)

Standard abbreviations
- ISO 4: Int. Mark. Rev.

Indexing
- ISSN: 0265-1335
- LCCN: 88659225
- OCLC no.: 48650607

Links
- Journal homepage; Online archive

The International Marketing Review is a peer-reviewed academic journal published by Emerald Group Publishing. It was established in 1983. The editors-in-chief are Jeryl Whitelock (University of Bradford) and John Cadogan (University of Loughborough).

== Overview ==
According to the Journal Citation Reports, the journal has a 2022 impact factor of 5.0.
