= Época Negócios =

Brazilian business and economy magazine

- Publisher: Editora Globo
- Founded: March 2007
- Website: epocanegocios.globo.com

Época Negócios is the business and economy magazine of Editora Globo (a company belonging to Grupo Globo) which publishes more than a dozen titles, including Época and Galileu.

Launched in March 2007, the magazine is led by Sandra Boccia. Its motto is "Inspiração para Inovar." Época publishes focuses on business, economics, technology, and innovation.
