= Journal of Marketing Theory and Practice =

Peer-reviewed academic journal

- Discipline: Marketing
- Language: English
- Edited by: Raj Agnihotri

Publication details
- History: 1992-present
- Publisher: Routledge
- Frequency: Quarterly
- Open access: Hybrid

Standard abbreviations
- ISO 4: J. Mark. Theory Pract.

Indexing
- ISSN: 1069-6679 (print); 1944-7175 (web)
- LCCN: 94658553
- JSTOR: 10696679
- OCLC no.: 67032583

Links
- Journal homepage; Online access; Online archive

The Journal of Marketing Theory and Practice is a quarterly peer-reviewed academic journal covering research on marketing. It was established in 1992 and is published by Routledge. The editor-in-chief is Raj Agnihotri (Iowa State University).

== Abstracting and indexing ==
The journal is abstracted and indexed in:

- EBSCO databases
- Emerging Sources Citation Index
- ProQuest databases
- Scopus
