= Journal of Business Communication =

International Journal of Business Communication
- Discipline: Business communication
- Language: English
- Edited by: Jacqueline Mayfield, Milton Mayfield

Publication details
- Former names: Journal of Business Communication, The ABCA Journal of Business Communication, The Journal of Business Communication
- History: 1963-present
- Publisher: SAGE Publishing
- Frequency: Quarterly
- Impact factor: 2.625 (2021)

Standard abbreviations
- ISO 4: Int. J. Bus. Commun.

Indexing
- ISSN: 2329-4884 (print); 2329-4892 (web)
- LCCN: 87656621
- OCLC no.: 14392577

Links
- Journal homepage; Online access; Online archive

The International Journal of Business Communication is a quarterly peer-reviewed academic journal covering the field of business communication. The editors-in-chief are Jacqueline and Milton Mayfield (Texas A&M International University). It was established in 1963 and is published by SAGE Publishing in association with the Association for Business Communication.

== Abstracting and indexing ==
The journal is abstracted and indexed in:

- Communication Abstracts
- ERIC
- Linguistics and Language Behavior Abstracts
- Scopus
- Social Sciences Citation Index
- EBSCO
- ProQuest
