= Journal of Leadership & Organizational Studies =

- Discipline: Management studies
- Language: English
- Edited by: Sean Hannah

Publication details
- Former name: Journal of Leadership Studies
- History: 1993-present
- Publisher: SAGE Publications
- Frequency: Quarterly
- Impact factor: 3.611 (2021)

Standard abbreviations
- ISO 4: J. Leadersh. Organ. Stud.

Indexing
- ISSN: 1548-0518 (print); 1939-7089 (web)
- LCCN: 2002227169
- OCLC no.: 300176195

Links
- Journal homepage; Online access; Online archive

The Journal of Leadership & Organizational Studies is a quarterly peer-reviewed academic journal that covers research in the field of management studies. Its editor-in-chief is Sean Hannah (Wake Forest University). It was established in 1993 at Baker College and is currently published by SAGE Publications in association with Midwest Academy of Management.

== Abstracting and indexing ==
The Journal of Leadership & organizational Studies is abstracted and indexed in:

- Business Source Complete
- Business Source Corporate
- Expanded Academic ASAP
- InfoTrac
- PsycINFO
- Scopus

According to the Journal Citation Reports, its 2022 impact factor is 4.8, ranking it 107 out of 227 journals in the category 'Management'.
