= Group & Organization Management =

- Discipline: Business
- Language: English
- Edited by: Paul Harvey and William Obenauer

Publication details
- Former names: Group & Organization Studies
- History: 1976-present
- Publisher: SAGE Publications
- Frequency: Bimonthly
- Impact factor: 4.8 (2022)

Standard abbreviations
- ISO 4: Group Organ. Manag.

Indexing
- ISSN: 1059-6011 (print); 1552-3993 (web)
- LCCN: 92644082
- OCLC no.: 645151002

Links
- Journal homepage; Online access; Online archive

Group & Organization Management is a bimonthly peer-reviewed academic journal that covers the fields of industrial and organizational psychology and management. The editors-in-chief are Paul Harvey (University of New Hampshire, USA) and William Obenauer (Maine Business School, The University of Maine, USA). It was established in 1976 and is published by SAGE Publications.

Yannick J-L. Griep (Radboud University, Netherlands), the former editor-in-chief, was found by SAGE to have compromised the "objectivity of the peer-review process [...] on a subset of articles where they are co-author..." SAGE stated the affected articles would be retracted.

== Abstracting and indexing ==
The journal is abstracted and indexed in:

- Current Contents/Social & Behavioral Sciences
- EBSCO databases
- Emerald Management Reviews
- ProQuest databases
- PsycINFO
- Scopus
- Social Sciences Citation Index

According to the Journal Citation Reports, the journal has a 2022 impact factor of 4.8 .
