= List of University of Manchester alumni =

This is a list of notable alumni related to the University of Manchester and its predecessors the Victoria University of Manchester and the University of Manchester Institute of Science and Technology. It excludes those who only have an honorary degree.

== Fine and applied arts ==
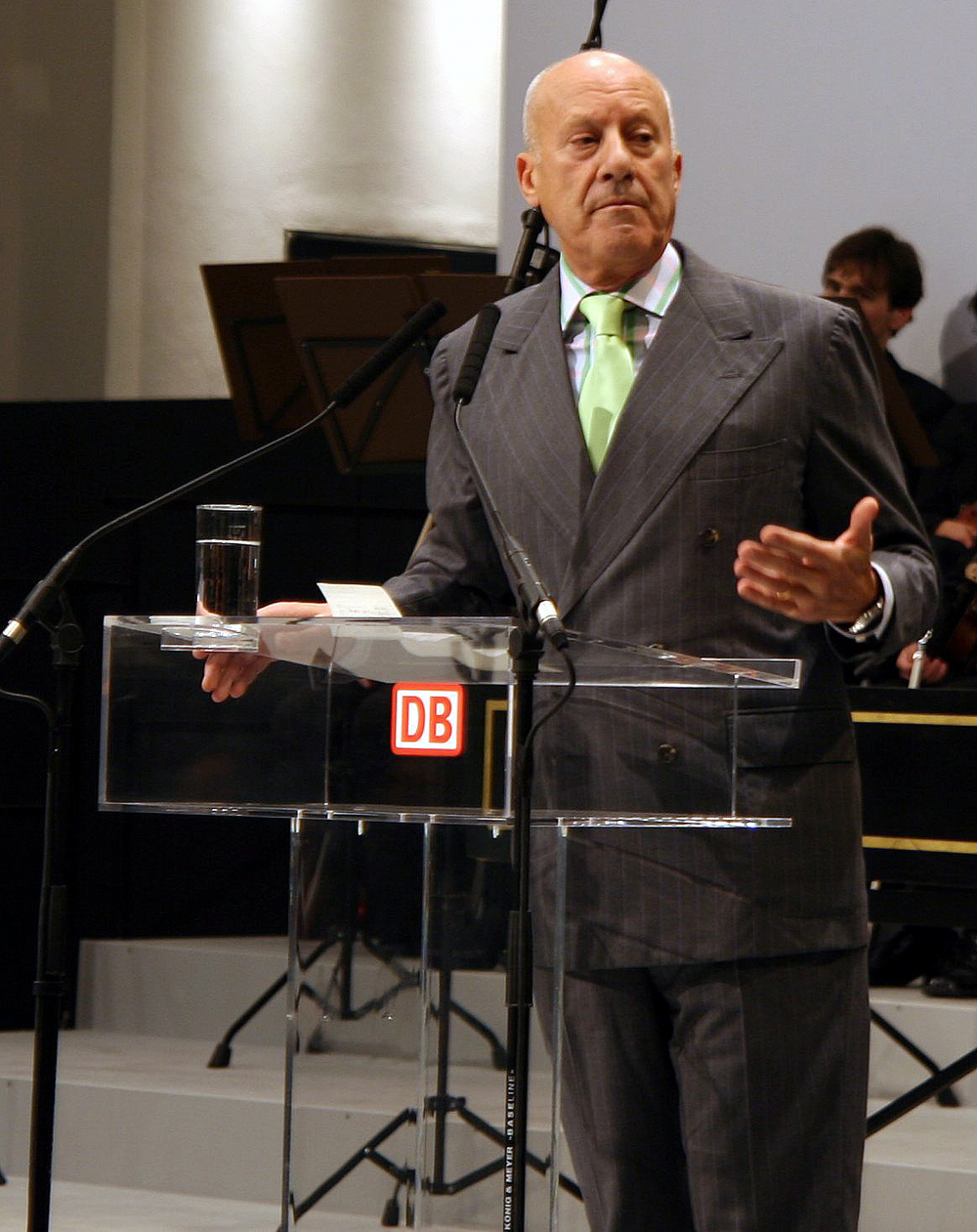
Norman Foster, Baron Foster of Thames Bank, famous architect

=== Architecture ===
- Norman Foster, Baron Foster of Thames Bank, British architect, (Pritzker Prize 1999, Stirling Prize 1998, 2004)
- Patrick Garnett, Swinging Sixties architect
- Rod Hackney, British architect, past president of Royal Institute of British Architects
- Stephen Hodder, English architect (Stirling Prize 1996)
- Edward Hubbard, English architectural historian
- Leslie Martin, leading advocate of the International Style
- Alfred Waterhouse, English architect associated with the Victorian Gothic Revival style

=== Literature ===
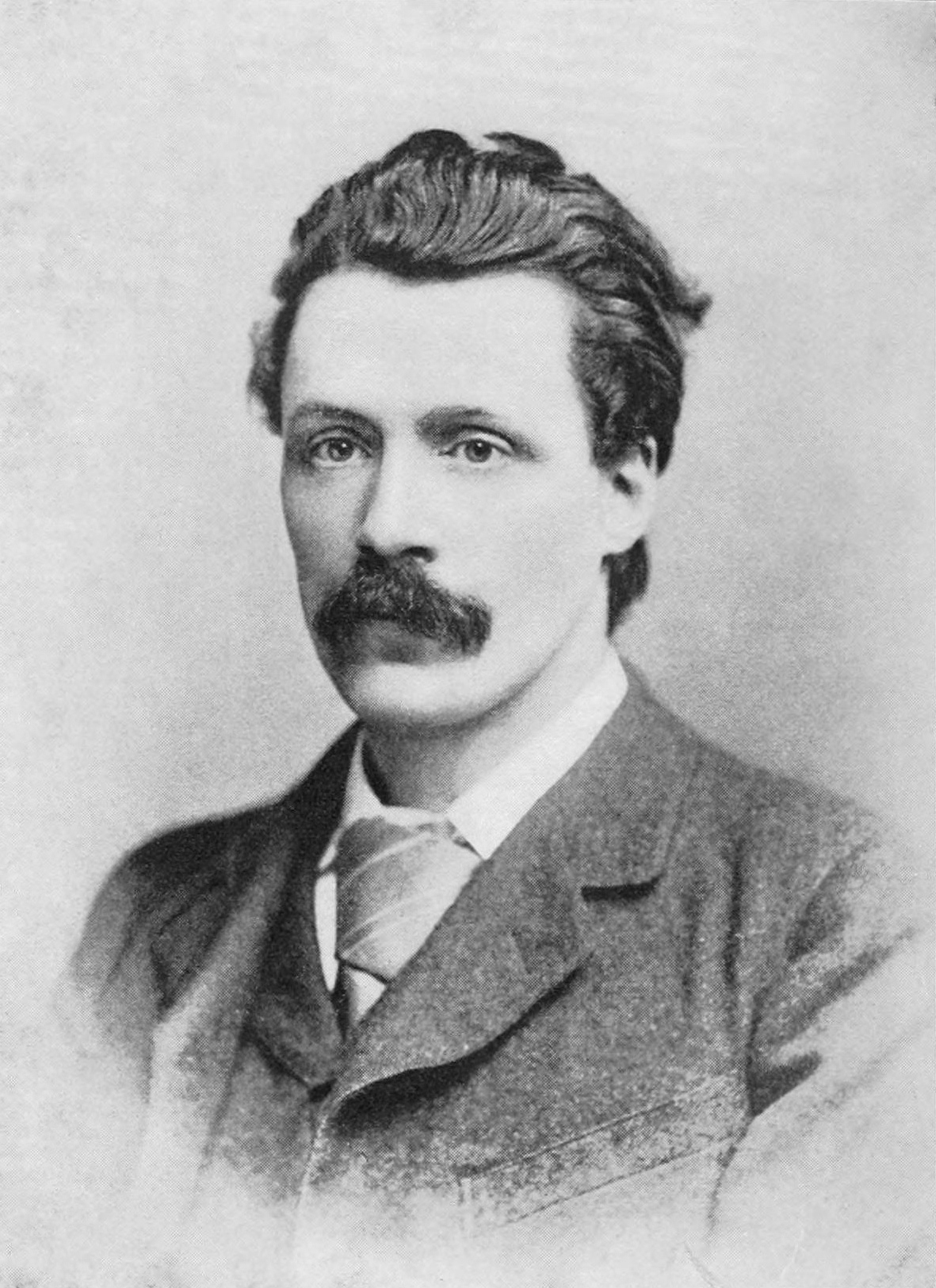
George Gissing, novelist

- Louis de Bernières, novelist best known for Captain Corelli's Mandolin (1994)
- Malcolm Bradbury, PhD, American Studies, 1955–62, author best known for The History Man (1975)
- Anthony Burgess, BA, English Literature, 1937–40, writer best known for A Clockwork Orange
- Miguel Esteves Cardoso, Portuguese writer and journalist
- Vish Dhamija, Indian author
- Jennifer Kewley Draskau, Manx historian, linguist, teacher and political candidate
- Daniel Ford, American author and journalist
- Alex Garland, BA, History of Art, novelist and script-writer
- George Gissing, novelist
- Sophie Hannah, award-winning poet and novelist
- A. J. Hartley, Shakespeare professor and novelist
- A.M. Howell, children's writer
- Grevel Lindop, PhD, poet, academic and literary critic
- Ruth Manning-Sanders, Welsh poet and author
- Stephen Mitchell, Head of News Programmes, BBC
- Leah Moore, BA, British comic book writer and author
- Meta Mayne Reid, children's writer
- Francis Thompson, English poet
- Barry Unsworth, British novelist (Booker Prize 1992)
- Alison Uttley, children's writer

=== Music ===
- Edward Barton, songwriter and poet
- Tim Booth, lead singer of James
- Martin Butler, composer
- Sir Peter Maxwell Davies, composer, Master of the Queen's Music
- John W. Duarte, composer and classical guitarist
- Paul McCreesh, conductor
- Ed O'Brien, guitarist and member of Radiohead
- Mark Radcliffe, radio broadcaster, musician and writer
- Ed Simmons and Tom Rowlands of The Chemical Brothers
- Jasmin Kent Rodgman, composer and co-artistic director of the Manchester Collective

=== Theatre, cinema and broadcasting ===
- Sophie Aldred, actress and television presenter
- Roger Allam, actor
- Jesse Armstrong, American Studies, British screenwriter and producer
- Shona Auerbach, award-winning director/cinematographer of Dear Frankie
- Sam Bain, British comedy writer
- Robert Bolt, playwright and screenwriter
- Philip Bretherton, actor
- Amelia Bullmore, studied drama, actor
- Debbie Chazen, Russian studies,
- Parineeti Chopra, Bollywood actress
- Gabriel Clark (actor), actor, theatre director and writer
- Jo Coburn, journalist with BBC News
- Benedict Cumberbatch, actor
- Adrian Edmondson, comedian and actor
- Beattie Edmondson, comedian and actress
- Ben Elton, comedian and writer
- Gamal Fahnbulleh, news presenter and reporter
- Fra Fee, Northern Irish actor and singer
- Peter Flannery, playwright and scriptwriter
- Anna Ford, BA Economics, broadcaster, former university chancellor
- Pam Gems, playwright and feminist
- Olivia Hallinan, actress
- Charlotte Hawkins, television presenter and newsreader
- Tony Hawks, comedian and writer (dropped out)
- Mathew Horne, comedian and actor
- Daniel Howell, YouTube personality, BBC Radio 1 presenter (dropped out)
- Waldemar Januszczak, art critic and broadcaster
- Toby Jones, actor
- Charlotte Keatley, dramatist
- Mark Kermode, PhD, broadcaster and film critic
- Armeena Khan, Pakistani actress
- Atul Khatri, Indian comedian
- C. A. Lejeune, film critic
- Doon Mackichan, comedian
- Sarfraz Manzoor, journalist, documentary maker, and broadcaster
- Jackie Maxwell, theatre director
- Rik Mayall, comedian and actor
- Shazia Mirza, stand-up comedian and columnist
- Mike Morris, BA in American and English Literature, television presenter and journalist
- Alison Newman, actress
- David Oakes, actor
- Carolyn Pickles, actress
- Olivia Poulet, actress
- George Rainsford, actor
- John Rawling, sport commentator and columnist
- Sophie Raworth, degree in French and German, newsreader and journalist
- Meera Syal, comedian, actress and writer
- Tom Watt, actor and sports broadcaster
- Jack Whitehall, comedian (dropped out)
- Josh Widdicombe, BA, comedian and actor

=== Others ===
- Natalia Fuchs, MA, art critic, new media researcher, international curator and cultural producer
- Tessa Jackson, contemporary art curator, writer and administrator
- Pat McDonagh, fashion designer
- Tom Palin, MA in Art History, painter

== Social sciences ==
=== Business ===
- David Alliance, Baron Alliance (1932-2025), businessman and politician, Member of the House of Lords
- Richard Beckman, media and entertainment executive
- Tom Bloxham, founder of regeneration firm Urban Splash; former Chancellor of the University of Manchester
- Johnny Boufarhat, Australian-born British businessman
- Terence Burns, Baron Burns, economist and Chairman of Ofcom
- Jeremy Coller, founder of Coller Capital, a British private equity firm
- Karen Cook, chairman (global) of investment banking division of Goldman Sachs
- Andy Cosslett, CEO of Fitness First
- Sola David-Borha, Chief Executive for Africa Region, Standard Bank
- Andy Duncan, chief executive of Channel 4 television
- Keith Edelman, managing director of Arsenal Football Club
- Ron Emerson, founding Chairman of the British Business Bank
- Chris Finlayson, CEO of BG Group
- Rijkman Groenink, Dutch banker, chairman of the managing board, ABN AMRO
- Steve Harrison, advertising creative and founder of Harrison Troughton Wunderman
- Nicholas Lander, restaurant critic for the Financial Times and consultant to the restaurant industry
- Terry Leahy, former CEO of Tesco, the largest UK supermarket chain
- Neil Kadisha, American-Iranian entrepreneur
- Sir Christopher Needham, businessman and Liberal politician
- Paul Pester, former CEO of TSB Bank
- Andrew Pettigrew, professor at the Saïd Business School
- Brian Quinn, former Deputy Governor of the Bank of England and chairman of Celtic FC board
- Peter Rogers, Chief Executive of Babcock International (2003–2016)
- Seebohm Rowntree, industrialist, sociologist and social reformer
- Michael Sherwood, banker, vice-chairman of Goldman Sachs until 2016
- Paul Skinner, former chairman of Rio Tinto
- Richard Solomons, CEO of InterContinental Hotels Group
- Tim Steiner, businessman, CEO of Ocado
- Aung Tun Thet, Myanmar economist and management consultant
- David Varney, executive chairman, HM Revenue and Customs
- Alan Wood, Chief Executive, Siemens plc and President of EEF the manufacturers organisation

=== Economics ===
- Sir Jon Cunliffe, Deputy Governor of the Bank of England
- David Forrest, applied economist and econometrician, Professor of Economics at the Salford Business School
- Simon Johnson (awarded Nobel Prize in 2024), Professor of Entrepreneurship at the MIT Sloan School of Management
- Masoud Nili, Iranian economic advisor
- William White, Canadian economist

=== Education ===
- Dame Alexandra Burslem, former Vice-Chancellor of Manchester Metropolitan University
- Reginald Fraser Amonoo, Ghanaian academic, retired professor of modern languages
- Emanuel de Guzman, Filipino sociologist and president of the Polytechnic University of the Philippines
- Susan Sutherland Isaacs, English educational psychologist and psychoanalyst
- Eni Njoku, former vice-chancellor of the University of Lagos
- Colin Riordan, President and Vice-Chancellor at Cardiff University
- Brian Roper, economist and former vice-chancellor of London Metropolitan University
- Roy Shaw, educationalist and public servant
- Kathleen Tattersall, first chief regulator at Ofqual
- Ali Asghar Varsei, Iranian academic and the 8th chancellor of Imam Khomeini International University

== Religion and philosophy ==
- Will Adam, Archdeacon of Canterbury
- Cyril Ayden Fisk, Methodist priest and Royal Air Force chaplain
- Ken Gibbons, Archdeacon of Lancaster (1981–1997)
- John Hawthorne, philosopher and professor
- Joseph Anthony Kelly, Catholic newspaper editor, publisher and public theologian
- Alasdair MacIntyre, known for his contribution to moral and political philosophy
- Colin McGinn, philosopher
- Catherine Pepinster, religion writer and commentator
- Alan P. F. Sell, minister of the United Reformed Church and theologian
- Peter Simons, professor of philosophy at Trinity College Dublin
- Barry Smith, PhD, philosopher

== Science and engineering ==
- Sir James Chadwick, physicist credited with the discovery of the neutron
- Alwen M. Evans, tropical entomologist
- Carole Goble, computer scientist and academics
- Nicholas Thatcher, professor of oncology
- Sir Joseph J. Thomson, physicist credited with the discovery of the electron
- John Polanyi, winner of the 1986 Nobel Prize for Chemistry

== Other fields ==
- Nicholas Ashley-Cooper, 12th Earl of Shaftesbury, English peer
- Sue Biggs, Director General of the Royal Horticultural Society
- Arthur Whitten Brown, aviator who was the navigator of the first successful non-stop transatlantic flight
- Andrew Cohen, BSc Pharmacology 1994, BBC's current Head of Science
- Tony Lloyd, former Member of Parliament for Manchester Central, Police and Crime Commissioner and Interim Mayor for Greater Manchester
- Linda Norgrove, Ph.D. (2002), kidnapped by the Taliban in Afghanistan, and killed in rescue effort
- Christine Nuttall, MA, teacher of English as a Foreign Language
- Maurice Oldfield, director of the Secret Intelligence Service
- David Park, Director of the Courtauld Institute Conservation of Wall Painting Department.
- Isabel Abraham Ross, teacher, suffragist, pacifist and biographer
- Reynhard Sinaga, Indonesian serial rapist and described as the most prolific rapist in British legal history

=== History ===
- T. S. Ashton, economic historian
- K. K. Aziz, Pakistani author and historian
- Ion Popa, PhD, historian and author studying the role of churches in the Holocaust
- James Taylor, author, expert on maritime art

=== Sports ===
- John Besford, European champion in swimming
- Sir Philip Craven, Paralympic athlete in wheelchair basketball and swimming; current president of the International Paralympic Committee
- Tom Fenoughty, footballer with Sheffield United and Chesterfield
- Alan Gowling, footballer for Manchester United
- Vincent Kompany, MBA, footballer for Manchester City F.C.
- Conall Murtagh, footballer for Wrexham F.C.
- Michael Rock, swimmer, British champion 100 m and 200 m butterfly and Olympian
- Paul Scott, English cricketer
- Ruth Shevelan, trampolinist
- Graeme Smith, bronze medallist in swimming, 1996 Atlanta Olympic Games
- Matt Smith, footballer for Millwall
- Henry Thomas, rugby union player
- Michael Turner, former British freestyle swimmer
- Chrissie Wellington, double Ironman Triathlon world champion
- Arlo Ludewick, middle-distance runner
