= Alliance Manchester Business School =

Business school of the University of Manchester in Manchester, England

Coordinates: 53°28′03.72″N 2°14′13.20″W

- Type: Business School
- Established: 1918 as Department of Industrial Administration of UMIST; 1965 as Manchester Business School
- Parent institution: University of Manchester
- Director: Kenneth McPhail
- Location: Booth Street West, Manchester, M15 6PB, England, UK
- Campus: Urban
- Website: www.alliancembs.manchester.ac.uk

Alliance Manchester Business School (Alliance MBS) is the business school of the University of Manchester in Manchester, England. It is one of the oldest business schools in the UK, and provides education to undergraduates, postgraduates and executives.

According to the Financial Times 2018 Global MBA Rankings, its MBA programme is ranked 10th in Europe, 36th in the world and 4th in the UK. Its "MSc Business Analytics" programme ranked 6th in the world and 2nd in the UK; "MSc International Business and Management" 20th and "MSc Finance" 18th, as per the QS World University Ranking 2018.

It includes departments both from the former Victoria University of Manchester's Faculty of Business Administration, and from UMIST.

== History ==
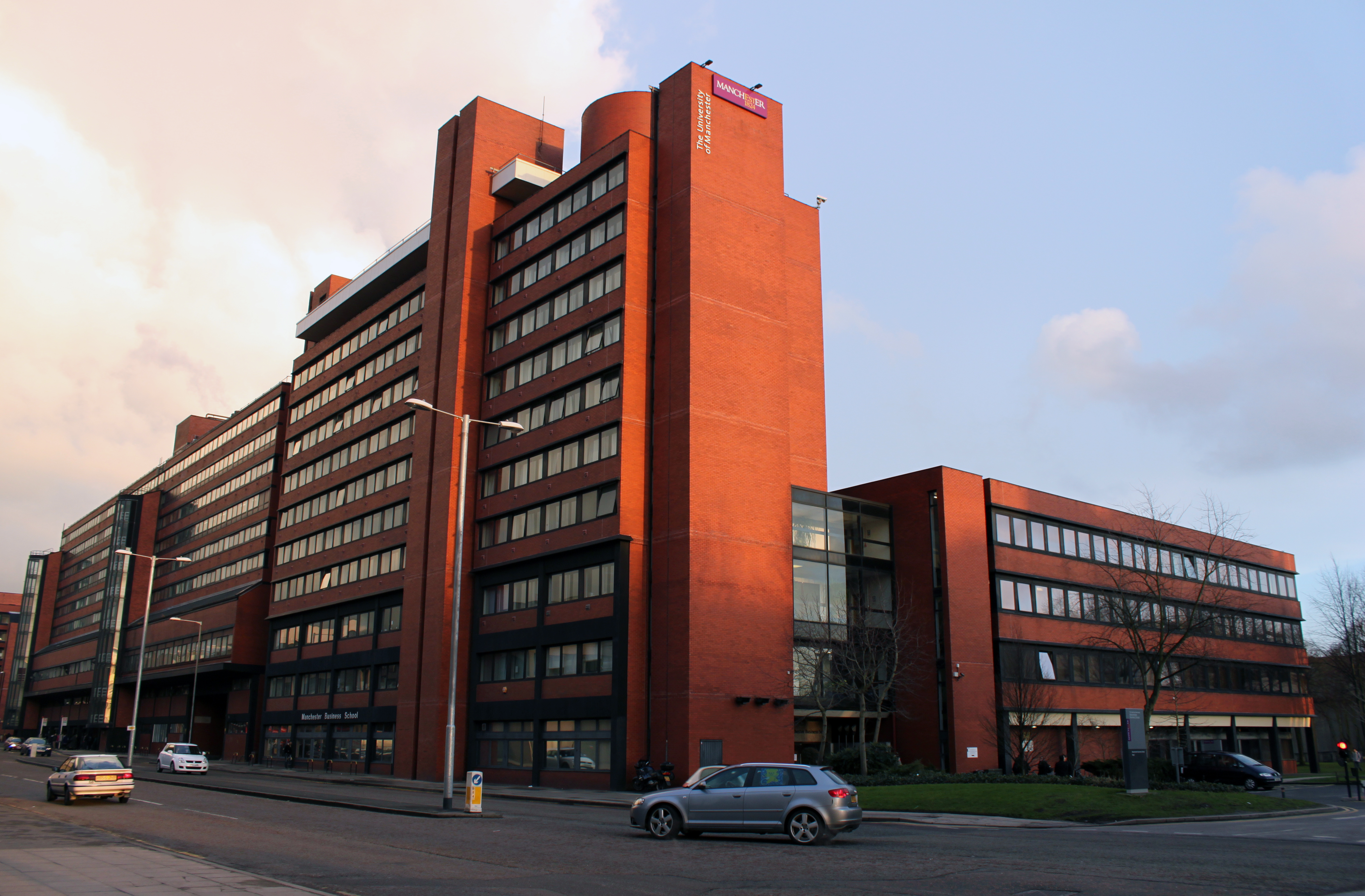
MBS West seen from Booth Street West

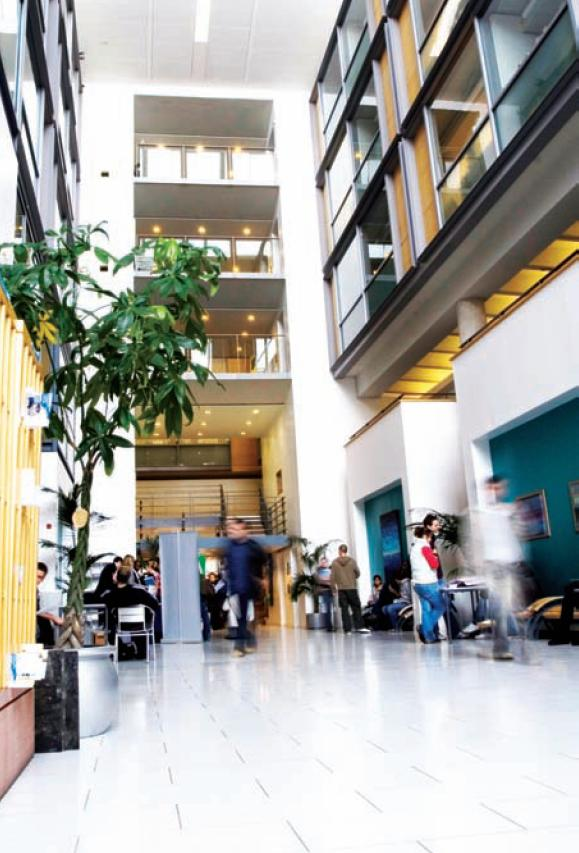
Atrium of MBS East situated on the corner of Booth Street West and Oxford Road. It is the home to the Undergraduate Services and some of the Research Centres.

The foundation of the School dates back to 1918, when the Manchester Municipal College of Technology (as UMIST was then called) pioneered academic training in management, with the formation of a Department of Industrial Administration funded by an endowment from asbestos magnate Sir Samuel Turner. The London School of Economics and Manchester Municipal College of Technology were the first higher education institutions in the UK to follow the US trend of offering postgraduate management programmes in the 1930s. The Department of Industrial Administration was heavily influenced by management science pioneer Charles Garonne Renold.

The Robbins Report in the 1960s recommended that two national centres for postgraduate business education be created, and the Franks Report subsequently suggested that one would be in London centred on the University of London (this would become the London Business School), and one in Manchester centred on the (Victoria) University and UMIST. These became the first two University Grants Committee-funded business schools. The first director of the business school was appointed in 1965. Grigor McClelland was the first research fellow at Balliol College, Oxford in Management Studies, the chairman of the grocery chain Laws Stores and founder of the Journal of Management Studies. McClelland introduced the Manchester Experiment, which would become known as the Manchester Method. The MBA course started in 1967. From 1968, the Business school came under Victoria University of Manchester's Faculty of Business Administration, that Grigor McClelland having been appointed Dean of the Faculty in 1967. In 1971, Manchester Business School and UMIST's Manchester School of Management were both among the twelve founder members of the Conference of University Management Schools (now the Chattered Association of Business Schools).

The "new" Manchester Business School was formed in 2004 as a result of the merger of UMIST's Manchester School of Management, the Institute of Innovation Research (IoIR), the Victoria University of Manchester's School of Accounting and Finance, and the 1965 created Manchester Business School. Prior to merger the constituent parts of new MBS formed, from 1994, the "Manchester Federal School of Business and Management". and occupied nearby buildings either side of Oxford Road On 21 September 2015, Manchester Business School changed its name to Alliance Manchester Business School, following a donation from Lord Alliance of Manchester and his fellow Trustees of the Alliance Family Foundation.

== Organisation ==
The school comes under the Faculty of Humanities of the University of Manchester. As of 2008 with over 200 teaching staff it is the largest campus-based business school in the country, and has an international student composition as three-quarters of its student body is from outside the UK.

Manchester offers PhD (full and part-time); D.B.A – Doctor of Business Administration (executive part-time); M.B.A – Master of Business Administration (full-time, executive part-time, and blended learning); several specialist masters programmes as well as undergraduate degrees. Entry requirements for undergraduate and postgraduate degrees are both highly competitive. For popular undergraduate courses such as Accounting and/or Finance, 70 places are available for approximately 1600 applicants. As of 2006, a minimum work experience of 3 years and a good GMAT is required for admission to the MBA programs.

The 18 months full-time MBA program is known for its "Manchester Method" which puts emphasis on learning by doing throughout the entire duration of the programme, including significant real life projects. In addition, the school offers the so-called "Manchester Gold" programme, a mentoring scheme to provide students with opportunities to meet regularly with professionals from a wide variety of sectors and industries. Last year's mentors, for example, came from high-profile companies such as Morgan Stanley, PricewaterhouseCoopers, Royal Dutch Shell Group, IBM Global Services and GlaxoSmithKline among many others.

As of 2013, the Head of MBS is Professor Fiona Devine OBE. The school's advisory board is chaired by businessman Tony De Nunzio.

== Accreditation and reputation ==
Among the bodies validating MBS programmes, the British Psychological Society validates its Organizational Psychology masters, and the Chartered Institute of Personnel and Development its HRM MSc degree. Its MBA is one of a select band worldwide which receive triple accreditation by AACSB International, AMBA and EQUIS. It is also a program partner of the CFA Institute.

The Financial Times Global MBA Ranking 2017 survey ranks MBS MBA 3rd in the UK, 10th in Europe and 30th in the world.

In 2011, the school was ranked among the top 30 business schools in the world for its MBA program, and 1st in the world for its doctoral program (both PhD and D.B.A). It is placed 11th in Europe and 4th in the UK, while being 6th in Europe for percentage salary increase of its graduates. Regarding international experience, MBS is 17th in the world and 7th in Europe as well as is ranked 13th in the world for the career progress of its alumni. The average salary of Manchester's MBA graduates after three years is US$116,100 – the 12th highest of European business schools.

Historic rankings, such as the Forbes survey, which lists business schools on their "return on investment" via a survey of alumni salaries, put Manchester 2nd in the UK and 5th in the world. In the Which MBA? survey MBS reached the 5th place in the UK, 8th in Europe and 30th in the world. The MBA Career Guide of international MBA recruiters placed Manchester 2nd in the UK, 7th in Europe and 15th in the world. In the 2009 QS Global 200 Business Schools Report the school was ranked 14th in Europe.

In the UK government Research Assessment Exercise 2008 (RAE 2008), MBS is ranked first of all UK universities for research power in Business and Management and Finance and Accounting. The Financial Times ranks MBS PhD programme 1st in the World (Jan 2012).

Furthermore, Manchester was selected by UK Border Agency as part of the Highly Skilled Migrant Programme which gives MBA-graduates from the world's top 50 business schools extra qualification points and helps them meet visa requirements to work in the UK. The Quality Assurance Agency for Higher Education (QAA) assessed the school's teaching quality with 24 out of 24 points.

== Global MBA programme ==
MBS offers a unique part-time option for Master of Business Administration students called the Part-time Global MBA. This programme provides online instruction along with the ability for students to study at any of six global centres, while receiving the same degree. Students are able to take classes in Manchester, China, Hong Kong, Singapore and Dubai. Students spend one week per semester attending workshops at one of the seven centres, and ten nights' hotel stay is included with the cost of tuition. Each centre has its own team of staff and facilities and all of them together support over 3,500 students from more than 100 countries around the world. The same faculty members teach across the centres representing forty different countries.

== Grigor McClelland lecture series ==
As part of the 50th anniversary of the Manchester Business School in 2015, the annual Grigor McClelland lecture series was launched to explore the interaction between business, education and social responsibility. It was named in honour of the first director, as this was an area that he had pioneered.

=== Previous lectures ===
- 2024 - Technology, Diversity and Social Good – Leading through Megachange - Ismail Amla, Executive Vice President, Professional Services, NCR.
- 2023 - Taking SMEs seriously: social responsibility for the 99% - Laura Spence, Professor of Business Ethics, School of Business and Management, Royal Holloway, University of London
- 2022 - Business ethics for the transition to Net-Zero - Frans Berkhout, Professor of Environment, Society and Climate, King's College London
- 2021 - Is business to blame for capitalism? - Diane Coyle, Bennett Professor of Public Policy, Bennett Institute for Public Policy, Cambridge
- 2020 - The crisis of democratic capitalism - Martin Wolf, Chief Economics Commentator, Financial Times
- 2019 - Ethical trade: challenges and opportunities for the future - Steve Murrells, CEO, The Co-operative Group
- 2018 - The opportunities of an ageing society: looking beyond the challenges - Anna Dixon, Chief Executive, Centre for Ageing Better
- 2017 - Renewing the Intergenerational Contract: age and 21st Century inequality - Torsten Bell, Director, Resolution Foundation
- 2016 - What is progress? Who are its enemies? How can business help? - Craig Bennett, CEO, Friends of the Earth
- 2015 - The future of the National Minimum Wage - Professor Sir George Bain

== Buildings ==
The older part of MBS, called "MBS West" is part of the University Precinct Centre complex on the southwest corner of Oxford Road and Booth Street West. The building houses lecture and conference suites and restaurant facilities including a 101-room hotel that is opening in 2017. It is also the home of the MBA programme. The complex was designed by Hugh Wilson and Lewis Womersley and dates from the 1970s. The newer part "MBS East" lies on the northeast corner of Oxford Road and Booth Street East. It was completed in 1997 at the time when the UMIST departments co-located to form the Federal School. The building cost £7m and was designed by London architects ORMS. MBS East currently houses undergraduate services and some of the Research Centres of MBS.

Manchester Accounting and Finance Group (MAFG) of MBS is located in Crawford House, which is situated opposite MBS East on the southwest corner of Oxford Road and Booth Street West and is linked via a pedestrian walkway. The Masood Enterprise Centre, pioneer of the Master of Enterprise degree, is located in the Zochonis Building, Brunswick Street.

As announced on 15 August 2014, The MBS West is now approved for £50m refurbishment. This strategic development forms part of the University's ten-year, £1 billion Campus Masterplan to create some of the most modern campus facilities in the world along the southern gateway to the city, known as the Manchester Corridor. Subject to planning consent, work on the retail redevelopment will begin in 2015, with the development set to open in mid-2016. The wider scheme of MBS refurbishment works will be completed in phases with the final phase due for completion in early 2018. The plans reconfigure the existing precinct centre to create up to 14 units with double-height glazed frontages onto Oxford Road. The variety of units will create a mixed offer of retail, food and leisure for students, staff and visitors to the University and Business School. The offer will complement the new hotel and enhanced Manchester Business School Executive Education Centre, both of which are being developed as part of phase one, which was granted planning consent in April 2013 with construction due to commence later in 2014. In addition to the retail and leisure, phase two includes the removal of a link bridge across Oxford Road to improve views and light levels in the area. Public realm improvements such as pavement widening will enhance the area for pedestrians, cyclists and public transport users. The phase two redevelopment also includes the refurbishment of circa 200,000 sq ft of MBS facilities to create significantly improved teaching and administrative accommodation, a new Learning Library and Enterprise Zone.

== Research profile ==
In the previous 2001 Research Assessment Exercise (pre-merger) the 'old' Manchester Business School and Manchester School of Management were both rated 5. Manchester School of Accounting and Finance is one of only two accounting and finance schools in the UK rated as 6* by the RAE (i.e. with RAE 5* rating for two consecutive periods). According to a survey published by Accounting and Finance in 2008, MBS is ranked as the "world number one for accounting research".

Manchester has several research centres of international standing. These include those in the areas of decision sciences, employment and labour studies, technology management and innovation, and critical management studies. Among its Professors with World-ranked reputations are Fiona Devine (Sociology), Luke Georghiou (Policy), Ian Miles (Technological Innovation and Social Change), Giovanni Dosi (Innovation Economics), Paul Jackson (Corporate Communications), Joseph Stiglitz (Economics), Thomas Kirchmaier (Corporate Strategy/Governance), Colin Talbot (Public Policy and Management), Jikyeong Kang (Marketing), John Hassard (Organization Studies), Mick Marchington (HRM), Jill Rubery FBA (Employment Studies), Trevor Wood-Harper (Information Systems), Peter Kawalek (Information Systems and Strategy), Maria Nedeva (Innovation Management), Andrew Stark (Finance), Martin Walker (Accounting and Finance) and Richard Whitley (Business Systems). Karel Williams is currently co-heading a major new centre for the research of social change called CRESC.

== Notable alumni ==
- Tom Bloxham, founder of regeneration firm Urban Splash; former Chancellor of the University of Manchester
- Parineeti Chopra, Indian actress
- Karen Cook, chairman (global) of investment banking division of Goldman Sachs
- Sola David-Borha, Chief Executive for Africa Region, Standard Bank
- Vish Dhamija, Indian author
- Andy Duncan, chief executive of Channel 4 television
- Keith Edelman, managing director of Arsenal Football Club
- Rijkman Groenink, chairman of the managing board, ABN AMRO
- Atul Khatri, Indian Comedian
- Vincent Kompany, football player, defender and former player and captain of Manchester City FC
- Nicholas Lander, restaurant critic for the Financial Times and consultant to the restaurant industry
- Terry Leahy, former CEO of Tesco, the largest UK supermarket chain
- Tony Lloyd, former Member of Parliament for Manchester Central, Police and Crime Commissioner and Interim Mayor for Greater Manchester
- Andrew Pettigrew, currently Dean of the University of Bath School of Management
- Brian Quinn, former Deputy Governor of the Bank of England and chairman of Celtic FC board
- Paul Skinner, former chairman of Rio Tinto
- Aung Tun Thet, Myanmar economist and management consultant
- David Varney, executive chairman, HM Revenue and Customs

== Notable academics ==
- Grigor McClelland, first director of the school
- Michael Earl, former lecturer at MBS, later Dean of Templeton College, Oxford
