= William H. Starbuck =

American academic

William Starbuck
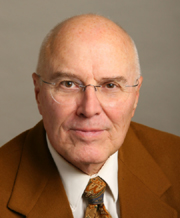
- Born: September 20, 1934 (age 92); Portland, Indiana
- Known for: Self-Designing Organizations; Management Psychology Studies
- Scientific career
- Fields: Cognitive Psychologist; Organizational Behavior; Organization Theory
- Workplaces: New York University; University of Wisconsin–Milwaukee; University of Oregon; Carnegie Mellon University

William Haynes Starbuck (born in Portland, Indiana on September 20, 1934) graduated from Harvard University (AB Physics, 1956) and the Carnegie Institute of Technology (MSc, 1959; Ph.D. 1964). He is an organizational scientist who has held professorships in social relations (Johns Hopkins, 1966–67), sociology (Cornell, 1967–1971), business administration (Wisconsin-Milwaukee, 1974–1984), and management (New York University, 1985–2005).

== Major works ==
- "Organizational growth and development." Pages 451–583 in J. G. March (ed.), Handbook of Organizations; Rand McNally, 1965.
- "Camping on seesaws: Prescriptions for a self-designing organization," with Bo L. T. Hedberg and Paul C. Nystrom. Administrative Science Quarterly, 1976, 21: 41–65.
- Handbook of Organizational Design, two volumes, edited with Paul C. Nystrom; Oxford University Press, 1981.
- William H. Starbuck contributed more than one hundred articles to leading scientific journals such as Administrative Science Quarterly, American Sociological Review, Behavioral Science, Journal of Management Studies, Organizational Science etc.
- William H. Starbuck, The Production of Knowledge: The Challenge of Social Sciences Research (Oxford University Press, 2006).
- William H. Starbuck, Organizational Realities: Studies of Strategizing and Organizing (Oxford University Press, 2006)

== Publications ==
- Andrews P.W.S. (1949), Manufacturing business, Londres: McMillan,
- Baumard, P./Starbuck, W.H. (2005): Learning from failures: Why it may not happen, in: Long Range Planning 38 (3), S. 281–298.
- Box G.E. P. & Draper N.R. (1969), Evolutionary Operation, New York: Wiley.
- Chapin, F.S. (1957), ‘The optimum size of institutions: a theory of the large group’, American Journal of Sociology, 62, pp. 449–460.
- Cohen M., March J.G. & Olsen J.P. (1972), « A garbage can model of organizational choice’, Administrative Science Quarterly, 17, pp. 1–25.
- Cyert R.M. and March J.G. (1963), Contributions to A Behavioral Theory of the Firm, Englewoodcliffs, NJ: Prentice-Hall.
- Cyert R.M., March J.G. & Starbuck W.H. (1961), ‘Two experiments on bias and conflict in organizational estimation’, Management Science, 7: 254–264, 1961.
- DiMaggio P.J. (1995), ‘Comments on ‘What Theory is Not’’, Administrative Science Quarterly, 40, pp. 391-397.
- Festinger, L. (1942), ‘A theoretical interpretation of shifts in level of aspiration’, Psychological Review, 49, pp. 235–250.
- Festinger, L. (1957), A theory of cognitive dissonance, Evanston, Ill.: Row, Peterson, 1957.
- Haire, M. (1959), ‘Biological models and empirical histories of the growth of organizations’, in M. Haire (ed.), Modern organization theory, New York: Wiley, pp. 272–306, 1959.
- Hedberg, B.L.; Nystrom P.C. and Starbuck, W.H. (1976), ‘Camping on seesaws: Prescriptions for a self-designing organization’, Administrative Science Quarterly, 21: 41–65.
- Jones, R.V. (1975), ‘The Theory of Practical Joking - An Elaboration’, The Institute of Mathematics and its Applications, 11 (2), pp. 10–17.
- March J.G. and Olsen J.P. (Eds.) (1976), Ambiguity and Choice in Organizations, Bergen: Universitetsforlaget.
- March J.G. and Simon, H.A. (1958), Organizations, New York: Wiley, 1958.
- March, J.G. (1978), ‘Rationality, ambiguity, and the engineering of choice’, Bell Journal of Economics, 9, pp. 587–608.
- Meyer A.D. et Starbuck W.H. (1993), ‘Interactions between politics and ideologies in strategy formation’, pp. 99–116 in K. Roberts (ed.), New Challenges to Understanding Organizations; Macmillan.
- Meyer J.W. and Rowan, B. (1977), ‘Institutionalized organizations: Formal structure as myth and ceremony’, American Journal of Sociology, 83 (2), pp. 340–363.
- Nystrom P.C. and Starbuck, W.H. (Eds.) (1977), Prescriptive Models of Organizations, Amsterdam: North Holland.
- Nystrom, P.C./Starbuck, W.H. (1984a): Managing beliefs in organizations, in: The Journal of Applied Behavioral Science 20 (3), S. 277–287.
- Nystrom, P.C./Starbuck, W.H. (1984b): To avoid organizational crises, unlearn, in: Organizational Dynamics 12 (4), S. 53–65.
- Penrose, E.T. (1959), The theory of the growth of the firm, New York: Wiley, 1959.
- Pontryagin L.S. (1961), ‘Asymptotic behavior of the solutions of systems of differential equations with a small parameter in the higher derivatives’, American MAthematical Society Translations, Series 2, 18, pp. 295–319.
- Simon, H.A. (1955), ‘A behavorial model of rational choice’, Quarterly Journal of Economics, 69, pp. 99–118, 1955.
- Simon, H.A. (1973), ‘Applying information technology to organizational design’, Public Administration Review, 33, pp. 268–278, 1973.
- Starbuck, W.H. (1958), ‘Level of aspiration theory and market behavior’, Carnegie Institute of Technology, Working Paper No. 7.
- Starbuck, W.H. (1961a), ‘Testing case-descriptive models’, Behavioral Science, 6: 191–199.
- Starbuck, W.H. (1963a), ‘Level of aspiration’, Psychological Review, 70: 51- 60.
- Starbuck, W.H. (1965a), ‘Mathematics and organization theory’, pp. 335–386 in J. G. March (ed.), Handbook of Organizations; Rand McNally.
- Starbuck, W.H. (1965b), ‘Organizational growth and development’, pp. 451–583 in J. G. March (ed.), Handbook of Organizations; Rand McNally.
- Starbuck, W.H. (1966), ‘The efficiency of British and American retail employees’, Administrative Science Quarterly, 11: 345–385.
- Starbuck, W.H. (1968a), ‘Organizational metamorphosis’, pp. 113–132 in R. W. Millman and M. P. Hottenstein (eds.), Promising Research Directions; Academy of Management, 1968a.
- Starbuck, W.H. (1968b), ‘Some comments, observations, and objections stimulated by 'Design of proof in organizational research’, Administrative Science Quarterly, 13: 135–161.
- Starbuck, W.H. (1971a) (Ed.), Organizational Growth and Development; Penguin Books.
- Starbuck, W.H. (1973), ‘Tadpoles into Armageddon and Chrysler into butterflies’, Social Science Research, 2: 81–109.
- Starbuck, W.H. (1974), ‘The current state of organization theory’, pp. 123–139 in J. W. McGuire (ed.), Contemporary Management: Issues and Viewpoints; Prentice-Hall.
- Starbuck, W.H. (1975), ‘Information systems for organizations of the future’, pp. 217–229 in E. Grochla and N. Szyperski (eds.), Information Systems and Organizational Structure; de Gruyter.
- Starbuck, W.H. (1976a), ‘Organizations and their environments’, pp. 1069–1123 in M. D. Dunnette (ed.), Handbook of Industrial and Organizational Psychology; Rand McNally.
- Starbuck, W.H. (1981a), ‘A trip to view the elephants and rattlesnakes in the garden of Aston’, pp. 167–198 in A. H. Van de Ven and W. F. Joyce (eds.), Perspectives on Organization Design and Behavior; Wiley-Interscience.
- Starbuck, W.H. (1982), ‘Congealing oil: Inventing ideologies to justify acting ideologies out’, Journal of Management Studies, numéro spécial ‘Ideologies within and around organizations’ (Starbuck, Ed.), 19(1): 3-27.
- Starbuck, W.H. (1983), ‘Organizations as action generators’, American Sociological Review, 48: 91–102.
- Starbuck, W.H. (1988b), ‘Surmounting our human limitations’, pp. 65–80 in R. Quinn and K. Cameron (eds.), Paradox and Transformation: Toward a Theory of Change in Organization and Management; Ballinger.
- Starbuck, W.H. (1989), ‘Why organizations run into crises ... and sometimes survive them’, pp. 11–33 in K. C. Laudon and J. Turner (eds.), Information Technology and Management Strategy; Prentice-Hall.
- Starbuck, W.H. (1993a), ‘'Watch where you step!' or Indiana Starbuck amid the perils of Academe (Rated PG) ’, pp. 63–110 in A. Bedeian (ed.), Management Laureates, Volume 3; JAI Press.
- Starbuck, W.H. (1993b): Keeping a butterfly and an elephant in a house of cards: The elements of exceptional success, in: Journal of Management Studies 30 (6), S. 885–921.
- Starbuck, W.H. (1994), ‘On behalf of naiveté’, pp. 205–220 in J. A. C. Baum and J. V. Singh (eds.), Evolutionary Dynamics of Organizations; Oxford University Press.
- Starbuck, W.H. (1996a), ‘Préface’, pp. v-vii in P. Baumard, Organisations Déconcertées. Paris: Masson.
- Starbuck, W.H. (2009): Cognitive reactions to rare events: Perceptions, uncertainty, and learning, in: Organization Science 20 (5), S. 925–937.
- Starbuck, W.H. (2010): What Makes a Paper Influential and Frequently Cited?, in: Journal of Management Studies (November),
- Starbuck, W.H./Barnett, M.L./Baumard, P. (2008): Payoffs and pitfalls of strategic learning, in: Journal of Economic Behavior & Organization 66 (1), S. 7-21.
- Starbuck, W.H. and Dutton J.M. (Eds.) (1971b), Computer Simulation of Human Behavior, Wiley.
- Starbuck, W.H. and Dutton, J.M. (1971c), ‘Computer simulation models of human behavior: A history of an intellectual technology’, IEEE Transactions on Systems, Man, and Cybernetics, SMC-1: 128–171.
- Starbuck, W.H. and Dutton, J.M. (1973), ‘Designing adaptative organizations’, Journal of Business Policy, 3(4), pp. 21–28.
- Starbuck, W.H. and Hedberg, B.L.T. (1977), ‘Saving an organization from a stagnating environment’, pp. 249–258 in H. B. Thorelli (ed.), Strategy + Structure =3D Performance: The Strategic Planning Imperative; Indiana University Press.
- Starbuck, W.H. and Mezias, J. (1996b), Opening Pandora's box: Studying the accuracy of managers' perceptions’, Journal of Organizational Behavior, 17(2): 99–117.
- Starbuck, W.H. and Milliken, F. (1988c), ‘Challenger: Changing the odds until something breaks’, Journal of Management Studies, 25: 319–340.
- Starbuck, W.H. and Milliken, F. (1988d), ‘Executives' perceptual filters: What they notice and how they make sense’, pp. 35–65 in D. C. Hambrick (ed.), The Executive Effect: Concepts and Methods for Studying Top Managers; JAI Press.
- Starbuck, W.H. and Nystrom P.C. (1984a), ‘To avoid organizational crises, unlearn’, Organizational Dynamics, 12(4): 53–65.
- Starbuck, W.H. and Nystrom, P.C. (1981c), ‘Designing and understanding organizations’, pp. ix-xxii in Volume 1 of Handbook of Organizational Design; Oxford University Press.
- Starbuck, W.H. and Nystrom, P.C. (1981d), ‘Why the world needs organisational design’, Journal of General Management, 6: 3–17.
- Starbuck, W.H. and Nystrom, P.C. (1977), ‘Why prescription is prescribed’, pp. 1–5 in Prescriptive Models of Organizations; Amsterdam: North- Holland.
- Starbuck, W.H. and Nystrom, P.C. (1981b) (Eds.), Handbook of Organizational Design, two volumes; Oxford University Press.
- Starbuck, W.H. and Webster, J. (1988a), ‘Theory building in industrial and organizational psychology’, pp. 93–138 in C. L. Cooper and I. T. Robertson (eds.), International Review of Industrial and Organizational Psychology 1988; Wiley.
- Starbuck, W.H., Greve A. and Hedberg, B.L.T. (1978), ‘Responding to crises’, Journal of Business Administration, 9(2): 111–137.
- Starbuck, W.H., Narayan Pant, P. (1990), ‘Innocents in the forest: Forecasting and research methods’, Journal of Management, 16(2): 433–460.
- Watzlawlick, P., Weakland J. and Fisch, R. (1975), Change: Principles of Problem Formation and Problem Resolution, Norton, 1974. Traduction française : Changements. Paradoxes et psychothérapies, Paris, Le Seuil.
- Weick, K.E. (1969) The Social Psychology of Organizing, Reading, MA: Addison-Wesley, 1979.
- Weick, K.E. (1977), ‘Organization design: Organizations as self-designing systems’, Organizational Dynamics, 6, No. 2, 30–46.
- Weick, K.E. (1995) ‘What Theory Is Not, What Theorizing Is’, Administrative Science Quarterly, 40, pp. 385–390.
- "William H. Starbuck", bibliographical entry : International Encyclopedia of Business and Management, London: Thomson Publishing, 1998.
- Schwab, A./Abrahamson, E./Starbuck, W.H./Fidler, F. (2010): PERSPECTIVE—Researchers Should Make Thoughtful Assessments Instead of Null-Hypothesis Significance Tests, in: Organization Science 22 (4), S. 1105–1120.
