= Karen Cook =

Karen Cook may refer to:

- Karen Cook (sociologist), American sociologist
- Karen Cook (banker), British banker
- Karen Mixon Cook, first professional female nightclub disco disc jockey in the United States

== See also ==
- Karen Koch, pronounced "Cook", American ice hockey goaltender
