= Grigor McClelland =

British businessman, academic and social activist

- Born: 2 January 1922; Gosforth
- Died: 6 November 2013 (aged 90–91)
- Education: Leighton Park School; Balliol College, Oxford
- Known for: Management Research, Retail and Social Activism
- Spouse(s): Diana Avery Close 1946–2000; Caroline Spence 2003–2013
- Children: Andrew McClelland; Stephen McClelland; Jen McClelland; Rosemary McClelland
- Awards: CBE; Hons.DCL; CBIM
- Scientific career
- Fields: Management
- Workplaces: Balliol College, Oxford; Manchester Business School; Victoria University of Manchester; Durham University

William Grigor McClelland CBE (2 January 1922 – 6 November 2013) was a British businessman, academic and social activist.

Born into a family of grocers, he managed his family firm of Laws Stores from 1948 to 1962, and again between 1978 and 1984. He became the first senior research fellow in Management Studies at the University of Oxford with Balliol College in 1962. During his time there he founded both the Journal of Management Studies and the Society for the Advancement of Management Studies. In 1965, he became the first director of the newly formed Manchester Business School, and wrote various papers on management techniques and ideas.

As the chair of the Washington Development Corporation, he played a strong role in attracting Nissan to build its first European factory in the UK. He also worked as a government advisor including serving on both the National Economic Development Council and the Industrial Reorganisation Corporation. His strong beliefs as a Quaker saw him elected to the chair of the Joseph Rowntree Charitable Trust as well as setting up the charities, the Millfield House Foundation and the Tyne & Wear Foundation. In 2011, Peter Moizer in his Financial Times article, Dean's column: a moral force stated,

He is a remarkable man who, guided by a moral compass that has never wavered, has changed the landscape of British business education in the past 50 years. His life and accomplishments are such that they need no exaggeration.

== Early years ==
McClelland was born in Gosforth on 2 January 1922, the only child of Arthur McClelland and his wife Jean (née Grigor). Arthur had founded his own grocery business, City Stores, in 1907; and in the year of McClelland's birth, he had purchased the nine stores of WM Laws, combining the two firms to create Laws Stores. He first went to Newcastle Preparatory School in Jesmond, before going to Leighton Park School in Reading, Berkshire, a boarding school that had been based on Quaker values since 1890. When McClelland was not at school, he worked in his father's stores and in later life boasted that he could cut precisely a pound of butter or cheese from a large block. However, his academic skills at Leighton Park were identified, and he was awarded a Ruskin scholarship at Balliol College, Oxford, to study Philosophy, Politics and Economics. However, he was unable to take his place at Oxford, as World War II started. McClelland being a Quaker was a conscientious objector, so instead volunteered for the Friends' Ambulance Unit, serving first in North Africa before moving to the front in Europe. When the war ended, McClelland stayed on to support the relief work for thirteen months, in which time he visited the Nuremberg trials and heard Martin Niemoeller speak. He was deeply affected by these experiences, and his letters and recollections were published in his 1997 book Embers of War: Letters from a Relief Worker in the British Zone of Germany, 1945–46, which has been referenced by many authors since. On his return to Britain, McClelland started his delayed scholarship at Balliol College, and achieved a First Class Masters within two years instead of the normal three.

== Business career - Laws stores ==
In 1948, after completing his degree at Oxford, he joined the family business of Laws Stores in the position of managing director, with his father, Arthur, becoming the company chairman. When McClelland joined the business it had around 52 grocery shops across the North East, but all were of the counter service variety. McClelland started to modernise the business by introducing self-service to the stores, and introducing a modern Power-Samas punched card computer recording system for both stock control, costings and the discharging of goods from the warehouse to the stores. McClelland tested the Resale price maintenance in 1953, when Laws Stores reduced all Fruit squash drinks by 6 pence, but the manufacturer stopped supplying Laws after the local grocers association complained. By 1957, the company had grown to 65 stores, with 385 employees and a turnover of £1.25 million a year. In the same year, McClelland returned to Oxford carry out further study into retailing, splitting his time with Laws. While at Laws he recognised that there was a need for management training, and in 1959 became an original member of the Foundation for Management Education. McClelland continued in his role as managing director after joining Balliol College in 1962, however in 1965 he stepped down from the role to become chairman of Laws Stores and to take up his new position with the Manchester Business School.

McClelland returned to the role of managing director of Laws in 1978. The company was at this point struggling against the growth of national brands, the company still operating from its first-generation supermarket stores and internal issues with warehousing. McClelland looked at how they could improve Laws profitability, including should they go down the discounter route, take the company upmarket, move into offering non-grocery stock or into different service industries. The company seriously considered several different options: becoming a specialist in fruit and vegetable retailing; becoming a specialist health food retailer; moving into the fast food business or targeting small town locations away from large supermarkets. The company did attempt to the move into the fast food trade by taking on a Kentucky Fried Chicken franchise, but the site proved to be wrong. McClelland did however improve their warehousing issues, opening a new warehouse, while freeing up space by outsourcing their frozen storage to Amalgamated Foods of Durham. By 1984 the company turnover had grown to £56 million, but as McClelland stated later in his essay Economies of Scale in British food retail, the company was struggling and needed to be sold before it became unsellable. In 1985 the whole chain was sold to Wm Low for £6.8 million.

== Academic career ==
In 1962, McClelland became the first ever senior research fellow in Management Studies at Oxford, when he accepted the role at Balliol College. The new role did not have a strong remit, which allowed McClelland to continue to split his time with being managing director at Laws Stores. However McClelland had seen scepticism amongst his colleagues at Balliol, which he joked about later on life saying he used to get invitations to college dinners to prove he didn't have two heads and a tail. Management studies drew considerable scorn in the UK, and although it had been well established in the United States, it was seen as a doubtfully respectable subject in the UK. Andrew Likierman, a former dean at the London Business School and former student of McClelland at Balliol College said in 2011,

At a time when most managers believed in the ‘University of Life’ and few thought management could be taught or researched, Grigor was well ahead of his time...He understood that academics and practitioners could usefully talk to each other and that the best management education would come from a combination of theory and practice.

McClelland decided to change that, when in 1963 he started the process of setting up both the Journal of Management Studies and the Society for the Advancement of Management Studies to oversee the journal. He believed that if management studies had a journal like other established subjects it would be seen as acceptable. McClelland's early corporate sponsors, however, clashed with him over their view of what the journal should entail. However, the journal started out publishing two short issues a year, featuring a reviews section and many papers on management education. The society was set up to be the editorial board of the journal. McClelland chaired the society, but had appointed prominent academics Paul Hannika, Pierre Tabatoni and Tom Lupton to help provide guidance and the necessary contacts to improve the journal. A key early highlight for the journal was McClelland securing the paper The business school: a problem in organizational design by Herbert A. Simon. McClelland would continue as editor until he stepped down from the role in 1965, but continued to be a member of the Society's board.

In 1965, McClelland was appointed as the first director for the newly formed Manchester Business School. The Robbins Report in the 1960s recommended that two national centres for postgraduate business education be created, and the Franks Report subsequently suggested that one would be in London centred on the University of London (this would become the London Business School), and one in Manchester centred on the Victoria University and University of Manchester Institute of Science and Technology. These became the first two University Grants Committee-funded business schools. In his application for the job role, McClelland wrote,

The aim of the School must be to play a major role in increasing the competence of British business management. It will do this primarily through the quality of the education it gives to its postgraduate and post-experience students and its research activity will also contribute by advancing relevant knowledge and its application.

After visiting a US Business school and discussing ideas with Herbert A. Simon and Igor Ansoff, McClelland introduced what he called the Manchester Experiment, which morphed into the Manchester Method. Unlike the other new business school in London, a practical approach to management education was introduced where learners would entail learning-by-doing, using detailed case studies of real businesses and live company projects. This method of teaching was joined by McClelland setting up a loose non-departmental structure which was based on teamwork instead of a hierarchical decisions. This was radical for the time, and McClelland had to integrate the differing beliefs, from those had worked at the former Manchester School of Management and Administration, which included Douglas Hague, John Morris and Alan Pearson; Luptonites who had been influenced by Tom Upton and Enid Mumford, and those who were swayed by Stafford Beer. McClelland championed the principle that business could not be divorced from society, and that managers should be socially and ethically responsible. He believed that believed the Manchester Business School had a moral responsibility, in that more effective managers would result in companies that generated more wealth, and therefore more jobs. The school initially offered diplomas and master's degrees, but under McClelland it introduced the MBA with the first learners graduating in 1969. In 1967, McClelland took on the role of Professor and Dean at Victoria University's Faculty of Business Administration, in addition to his role as director at the business school. McClelland would state in 1968 that

Management schools should ask, not how do humans behave in organisations, but given how humans behave in organisations, how should the manager proceed to attain his objectives?

Under McClelland's leadership the school opened the specialist Banking research centre in 1971, and along with his successor, Tom Upton, were instrumental in pushing for the appointments in new research and teaching positions in entrepreneurship and creativity. McClelland completed his own MBA in 1971. In 1977, McClelland left both of his roles at the school to return to his family business. John Wilson, in his book The Making of Modern Management: British Management in Historical Perspective, recalled in McClelland's own words, that he believed he was a facilitator, arguing it was his character rather than the quantum of his leadership which was more important in developing in what's was described as a federation of self-starters.

After returning to the north east in 1977, McClelland became a visiting chair at Durham University, working with the Business School, as well as with the departments of Engineering and Geography. Between 1986 until 1998, McClelland was a governor of the university's business school.

== Writing and speeches ==
McClelland wrote two seminal books, Studies in Retailing in 1963 and Costs and Competition in Retailing in 1966, which are regularly referenced. He wrote papers and articles that appeared in various journals and magazines on retail, management and quaker subjects.

In 1976, McClelland delivered his seminar And a New Earth at the Swarthmore Lecture. In 1996, McClelland delivered the first George Richardson Lecture, What is Quaker Studies.

=== Selected Bibliography ===
- 1958 – Sales per person and size in retailing: some fallacies (doi 10.2307/2097632)
- 1959 – Pricing for Profit in Retailing (doi 10.2307/2097812)
- 1960 – The least-cost level of stocks and the rate of interest (doi 10.2307/2097362)
- 1960 – Stocks in Distribution (doi 10.2307/2097408)
- 1962 – The Supermarket and Society (doi 10.1111/j.1467-954X.1962.tb01106.x)
- 1962 – Economics of the Supermarket (doi 10.2307/2228621)
- 1962 – The role of the super-market in the distribution of agricultural products (doi 10.1111/j.1477-9552.1962.tb01712.x)
- 1963 – Studies in Retailing (ISBN 978-0631078609)
- 1963 – The Organization of Distribution (doi 10.2307/2097380)
- 1966 – Costs and Competition in Retailing (ISBN 978-0333077979)
- 1967 – Career Patterns and Organizational Needs (doi 10.1111/j.1467-6486.1967.tb00572.x)
- 1969 – Management Education: Management Making Brainpower Effective (doi 10.1111/j.1467-6486.1969.tb00587.x)
- 1971 – Myth Squared (doi 10.1177/135050767100200202)
- 1973 – Management in a service environment (doi 10.1108/eb050396)
- 1974 – Integration of Research and Teaching in Management Education (
- 1975 – Mathematics in management—How it looks to the manager (doi. 10.1016/0305-0483(75)90114-0)
- 1990 – Defence Expenditure and the economics of safety: A comment (doi 10.1080/10430719008404679)
- 1997 – Embers of War: Letters from a Relief Worker in the British Zone of Germany, 1945–46 (ISBN 978-1860643125)
- 2015 – Sydney Bailey's Work in Quaker Perspective (ISBN 978-1315668239)

== Public service ==
McClelland served on many national and local government advisory bodies, as well as those of independent institutions, including:

- Social Science Research Council – 1971–74 – McClelland was the chair of the Management and Industrial relations committee.
- National Economic Development Council – 1969–71
- Economic Development Committee for Disruptive Trades - Chairman- 1980-84
- Economic Development Committee for Retail Trades - Chairman
- National Computing Centre – Deputy chairman- 1966–1968
- Industrial Reorganisation Corporation – 1966–71
- The Consumer Council - 1963-66
- National Institute of Economic and Social Research - Governor
- Northern Industrial Development Board – 1977–86
- Economic Planning Council Northern Region – 1965–66
- Royal Economic Society
- Council of the Supermarket Association
- National Board for Prices and Incomes
- Oxford Research Group – 2001–05 Director
- Employment Institute – 1985–92

In 1977, he was appointed Chairman of the Washington Development Corporation by the Secretary of State for the Environment Peter Shore, replacing Sir James Steel. As chairman, McClelland was empowered to decide on Washington Development Corporation involvement in any regional projects. McClelland in this role pushed for the development of Nissan's first European factory at Washington, and was part of the supervisory committee set up to negotiate the investment. McClelland continued in the role until the corporation was abolished in 1988.

== Voluntary work ==
McClelland, along with his first wife Diana were active members of the Society of Friends, at both local and national level, with him serving as an Elder between 1958 and 1962. Prior to World War II, McClelland had argued in a school speaking competition entitled When we have won the war that Germany should not be punished with another Versailles style treatment. He would later go on Quaker and International Fellowship of Reconciliation organised delegation trips, first to the USSR in 1952 and then China in 1952 and 1955, followed by the US in 1957, afterwards having to overcome smears of being a communist sympathiser. In his eighties, McClelland promoted to the Newcastle Local Friends meeting a new project. The Newcastle Conflict Resolution Network idea was adopted and receives funding from the Joseph Rowntree Charitable Trust.

McClelland joined the Joseph Rowntree Charitable Trust in 1956 as a trustee, and served as chair between 1965 and 1978, and vice chair during the 1980s. In the 1960s, he donated 10% of Laws Stores shares to the trust. In 1973, McClelland was appointed a founding trustee for the Anglo-German Foundation for the Society of Industrial Society, a charity founded to improve relations between Britain and Germany. In 1976, McClelland set up the Millfield House Foundation with his wife Diana, with the charity given a quarter of the shares in Laws Stores. The foundation, named after their family home, received a big cash boost with the sale of Laws Stores in 1985. As part of philanthropy the foundation asked its grant recipients, who were based in the North East, for their opinions on the charity's policy. In 1996 the foundation changed its policy, moving from giving grants for projects to tackle deprivation, instead focusing on influencing public policies to achieve beneficial social changes. From 1987 to 1993, McClelland was the Chairman of the Tyne Tees Telethon Trust. During 1988, McClelland co-founded the Tyne and Wear Foundation with George Hepburn. The community foundation started with funding of £30,000 a year for three years from the Baring Foundation, which was supplemented by a further £10,000 a year from four local trusts. McClelland recalled that he

...learned that we should target our fundraising at a very small sector – the top. We developed our standing partly by appointing honorary officers – the Lord Lieutenant of the county as President, two established local philanthropists, William Leach and Catherine Cookson, as patrons, and a dozen well-known figures connected within the region, as Vice-presidents.

In 1991, the Charles Stewart Mott Foundation and Charities Aid Foundation created a £2 million challenge fund, which the foundation was encouraged to bid for. The foundation tendered for a £1 million grant, but had to raise a further £2 million from others to be successful. McClelland used his contacts to pull together the elite of the North East, and the money was raised to receive their grant bid. Hepburn would later state that Grigor put his name and reputation behind an untried, untested project and made it great. In 1995, contrary to his Quaker beliefs against gambling, McClelland became a member of the North East Advisory Panel of the National Lottery Charities Board.

== Awards and recognition ==
McClelland was made a Companion at the British Institute of Management, the most senior grade of membership which was awarded by invitation only. In 1985, McClelland was honoured by Durham University when he was given an Honorary Doctorate in Law. In the Queen's Birthday Honours for 1994, McClelland was given a CBE for his charitable services in Tyne & Wear. It was reported he had previously turned down an award while Margaret Thatcher was Prime Minister. In 2003, he returned the CBE as part of his protest to the war in Iraq, but was given a receipt saying he could have it back when and if he wanted it, which he duly did in 2009.

In 2011, the Journal for Management Studies and the Society for the Advancement of Management Studies launched the Grigor McClelland Doctoral Dissertation Award. It is awarded to innovative scholarship demonstrated in a PhD or DBA thesis within management and organisation studies. As part of the 50th anniversary of the Manchester Business School in 2015, the Grigor McClelland lecture series was launched to explore the interaction between business, education and social responsibility. It was named in McClelland's honour as this was an area that he had pioneered in.

McClelland's papers are held by the University of Manchester Library.

== Personal life ==
McClelland met his first wife, Diana Avery Close, while they were volunteering as an aid worker in Germany after World War II and were married in 1946. They had four children, Andrew, Rosemary, Jen and Stephen. In 2000, Diana died of cancer, and three years later McClelland married another Quaker in Caroline Spence. In 2013, McClelland died at the age of 91.
