= Snejina Michailova =

New Zealand business academic (born 1965)

Snejina Michailova FRSNZ
- Born: 1965 (age 60–61)
- Education: Copenhagen Business School, Denmark
- Scientific career
- Workplaces: Copenhagen Business School, University of Auckland
- Thesis: INERTIA: organizational culture of Bulgarian industrial companies between stability and change (1997)

Snejina Michailova FRSNZ (born 1965) is a New Zealand business academic. She is currently a full professor at the University of Auckland. In 2025, Michailova was elected a Fellow of the Royal Society Te Apārangi.

== Academic career ==
After a 1997 PhD titled INERTIA: organizational culture of Bulgarian industrial companies between stability and change at the Copenhagen Business School she joined the staff there, before moving to the University of Auckland, rising to full professor.

Michailova is married to professor Kenneth Husted, also at the University of Auckland. They breed Icelandic horses on a rural property outside of Auckland.

In March 2025, Michailova was elected a Fellow of the Royal Society Te Apārangi "for her groundbreaking research in international business and management".

== Selected works ==
- Husted, Kenneth, and Snejina Michailova. "Diagnosing and fighting knowledge-sharing hostility." Organizational dynamics 31, no. 1 (2002): 60–73.
- Foss, Nicolai J., Kenneth Husted, and Snejina Michailova. "Governing knowledge sharing in organizations: Levels of analysis, governance mechanisms, and research directions." Journal of Management Studies 47, no. 3 (2010): 455–482.
- Michailova, Snejina, and Kenneth Husted. "Knowledge-sharing hostility in Russian firms." California management review 45, no. 3 (2003): 59–77.
- Michailova, Snejina, and Verner Worm. "Personal Networking in Russia and China:: Blat and Guanxi." European Management Journal 21, no. 4 (2003): 509–519.
- Michailova, Snejina, and Kate Hutchings. "National cultural influences on knowledge sharing: A comparison of China and Russia." Journal of Management Studies 43, no. 3 (2006): 383–405.
- Minbaeva, Dana B., and Snejina Michailova. "Knowledge transfer and expatriation in multinational corporations: The role of disseminative capacity." Employee relations 26, no. 6 (2004): 663–679.
