= Tony De Nunzio =

British businessman (born 1960)

Tony De Nunzio CBE
- Born: 1960 (age 65–66)
- Occupation: Businessman
- Known for: Chair Pets at Home Group plc CEO Asda/Walmart; CEO Maxeda

Tony De Nunzio has extensive experience in the European retail and consumer goods sectors as a finance professional, CEO and chairman.

== Biography ==
Tony De Nunzio is the chairman of Hermes UK, the British Retail Consortium and deputy chairman at Carphone Warehouse plc. He is also a senior advisor to Kohlberg Kravis Roberts & Co. L.P. and a director of PrimaPrix SA – a European discount chain. He was previously the non-executive chairman of Pets at Home Group plc, which he floated in March 2014.

He started his career in a number of financial roles with major international consumer goods companies – Unilever, L'Oreal and PepsiCo. In 1998, he was appointed CFO of Asda PLC and in 2002 was promoted to president and CEO of Asda/Walmart UK, the UK's number two food retailer.

In 2005, De Nunzio was appointed executive chairman of Maxeda, a company taken private by a group of private equity funds. The company was the largest non-food retailer in the Benelux with 12 retail formats covering electronics, department stores, fashion and do-it-yourself.

He has also previously been a non-executive director of Alliance Boots GmbH, chairman of the advisory board of Manchester Business School and deputy chairman of Howden Joinery Group plc (formerly Galiform plc/MFI).

In 2012, he won the Grocer Award for Outstanding Business Achievement in 2004. De Nunzio was appointed a CBE for services to the retail industry in 2005.
