= Yinka Sanni =

Nigerian corporate executive (born 1967)

- Born: Olayinka Omotosho Sanni; 1966 (age 59–60); Ibadan, Nigeria
- Education: University of Nigeria Nsukka (Bachelor of Agriculture in Agricultural Economics); Obafemi Awolowo University (Master of Business Administration)
- Occupations: Banker and corporate executive
- Years active: 1990 - present
- Title: Chief executive officer of African regions, Standard Bank Group
- Predecessor: Sola David-Borha

Olayinka "Yinka" Omotosho Sanni is a pastor and Group Executive at Standard Bank Group, headquartered in South Africa. He is formerly chief executive officer (CEO) of Africa Regions at the Standard Bank Group after occupying the same position (CEO) at Stanbic IBTC Holdings PLC.

== Early life and education ==
Sanni was born in Ibadan, Nigeria. After attending primary and secondary schools locally, he was admitted to the University of Nigeria, Nsukka, graduating in 1987, with a Bachelor of Agriculture degree, with focus on Agricultural Economics. He then entered Obafemi Awolowo University where he earned a Masters in Business Administration (MBA) degree. In addition, he has over the years attended the Harvard Business School and advanced leadership and management programs at The Wharton School. He is also a Fellow of the Chartered Institute of Stockbrokers of Nigeria.

== Career ==
Sanni began his banking career in 1990, in Lagos, at Investment Banking & Trust Company Limited (IBTC). In 2005, IBTC merged with two commercial banks to form IBTC Chartered Bank. In 2007, Standard Bank Group acquired IBTC, and the company was renamed Stanbic IBTC. Over the last 30 years, since joining the banking industry, Sanni has worked in various leadership roles in the financial service sectors, including retail banking, wholesale banking, and asset management. Sanni was also the pioneer Chief Executive of Stanbic IBTC Pension Managers Limited as well as the pioneer Chief Executive of Stanbic IBTC Asset Management Limited. In January 2017, he was appointed chief executive officer, Stanbic IBTC. On 15 April 2021, he was promoted to his current position, succeeding Sola David-Borha, who retired after 31 years at the company.

== Family ==
Sanni is married to Foluke Olabisi Sanni (née Banwo), a lawyer and human resources practitioner. They have two children.
