= Laws Stores =

Former British Supermarket chain

Laws Stores Ltd.
- Founded: 19th Century - WM Laws; 1907 - City Stores; 1921 - Combined to form Laws Stores
- Defunct: 1985
- Headquarters: Gateshead, Tyne and Wear
- Area served: United Kingdom
- Key people: Grigor McClelland

Laws Stores was a grocery store business that expanded across the North East of England and Southern Scotland, before moving into the burgeoning supermarket trade. It was purchased by Scottish grocery chain W M Low in 1985 as part of their expansion plans.

The original company of WM Laws was founded in Gateshead during the last quarter of the 19th century by William Maitland Laws. In 1907, Arthur McClelland, the son of Andrew Penman McClelland who was a partner in Joshua Wilson and Brothers, a Sunderland based wholesale grocery business, started his own grocery business, City Stores, in Shields Road, Byker. McClelland had completed an apprenticeship at a fellow Quaker grocery firm, Pumphrey & Carrick Watson of Newcastle. In 1921, McClelland purchased WM Laws nine stores and merged them with his own City Stores, branding the new business as Laws Stores. By 1939, the business had grown to 52 stores across the North East.

After completing a degree at Balliol College, Oxford, Arthur's son Grigor McClelland joined the company as managing director in 1948. During the 50s and he introduced a number of innovations including self-service and modern warehousing and distribution systems. In 1952, when addressing the Publicity Club in London, Grigor McClelland stated,

Impact of self-service shops on advertising will be an intensification of the trend towards displaying in the advertisement the actual picture of the product so that people can recognise it when they see it in a self-service shop

Laws Stores tested the Resale price maintenance in 1953, when they reduced all Fruit squash drinks by 6 pence, but the manufacturer stopped supplying Laws after the local grocers association complained. In 1957, the company had 65 stores, 385 employees and a turnover of £1.25 million a year. Grigor McClelland shared his managing director role at the company after joining Balliol College in 1962 to become their first fellow in Management Studies. While at Balliol, Grigor set up the Journal of Management Studies before moving on in 1965 to become the first director of the Manchester Business School. In the same year, McClelland became Chairman of Laws Stores and stopped running the company on a day to day basis. The company continued to challenge the resale price maintenance up and to the government brought in legislation to remove it. The company grew significantly during the supermarket boom of the late 60s and early 70s, including purchasing the Scottish grocery business of Unigate including eight Kibby's Supermarkets, but then faced challenges in the economic crisis and from larger supermarket chains. The company had a turnover of £6.4 million and profits of £170,000 in 1969, however by 1974 the turnover had increased to £14.7 million but profits had dropped to £150,000.

McClelland returned as Managing Director of Laws in 1978. The company was at this point struggling against the growth of national brands and the company still operating from its first generation supermarket stores, as we as internal issues with warehousing. McClelland looked at how they could improve Laws profitability, including should they go down the discounter route, take the company upmarket, move into offering non grocery stock or into different service industries. The company seriously looked at several different: specialist fruit and vegetable retailing, health food retailing, fast food business or targeting small town locations away from large supermarkets. The company attempted the move into the fast food trade by taking on a Kentucky Fried Chicken franchise, but the site proved to be wrong. McClelland did however improve their warehousing issues, opening a new warehouse, while freeing up space by outsourcing their frozen storage to Amalgamated Foods of Durham. By 1984, the company had a turnover of £56 million.

In 1985 the whole chain was sold to Wm Low at a cost of £6.8 million. In McClelland's article Economies of Scale in British food retail from 1990, he stated that the company was struggling and needed to be sold before it became unsellable. During 1986, Wm Low closed eight unprofitable Laws stores and converted the remaining 36 stores to their own branding.
