= Master of Enterprise =

The Master of Enterprise (M.Ent.) degree is a master's degree originally developed and offered by the University of Manchester through the Manchester Science Enterprise Centre (MSEC). A number of other universities have included the MEnt in their curriculum.

The MEnt aims to stimulate enterprise combined with a number of other disciplines originally Environmental Innovation (science), Computers, and Textiles but has gone on to include an ever-increasing number of subjects.

Each student gains half the degree through business enterprise modules and half through modules issued by their home department. The student, although based at MSEC through the majority of the course actually graduates from their chosen home department.

The programme is multi-disciplinary and owned by the collaborating school or department. It is modular in content (two units per semester) with a one-year-long enterprise project, comprising both the subject and enterprise exploitation elements.

The programme brings together three elements:

- To extend the candidate's understanding and knowledge in his/her chosen field of entrepreneurial endeavour.
- To impart business, management and enterprise skills and understanding of the business processes applicable to the development of knowledge based enterprises.
- To expose candidates to the processes involved in starting up and running a business.

== See also ==
- Entrepreneur
- Enterprise
- Manchester Science Enterprise Centre
- Manchester University
