= Natalia Fuchs =

- Наталия Вадимовна Фукс
- Born: November 6, 1981 (age 44)
- Education: Moscow School for the Social and Economic Sciences, University of Manchester (MA), Danube University Krems (MA)
- Occupations: Curator, Art Advisor
- Years active: 2009—
- Website: http://artypical.com/

Natalia Fuchs (born November 6, 1981) is an art critic, new media researcher, international curator and cultural producer.

== Biography ==
Natalia Fuchs was born on November 6, 1981, in Russia. She studied in Moscow School for the Social and Economic Sciences, obtained MA in Cultural Management in University of Manchester, UK and another MA in History of Media Arts in Danube University Krems, Austria. Before 2009 she worked in the field marketing and communications for Daimler Chrysler Russia, Ogilvy, Young & Rubicam and Aegis Media. In 2009—2011 she worked on Moscow International Film Festival Media Forum dedicated to media art and experimental filmmaking as Business Development and Public Relations Director at MediaArtLab. In 2010 she moved to Vienna and worked on VIENNAFAIR contemporary art fair and sound:frame audiovisual festival. Around that time she founded an art relations practice ARTYPICAL. Upon her return to Russia in 2013 Fuchs became a Curator in Polytechnic Museum in Moscow. She curated Polytech.Science.Art interdisciplinary program, Electronic Living Room experimental multifunctional space and museum's international science art exhibitions. Polytech.Science.Art was awarded a diploma from Ministry of Culture as "Best Educational Project in Museum" in 2015. In 2016 Fuchs joined Sila Sveta interactive media studio as International Communications Director. She was also appointed as Deputy Director, Curator and Multimedia Programs Manager in National Centre for Contemporary Arts in Moscow. In late 2017 she launched NCCA's TECHNE platform for innovative art. In 2018 together with Maurice Jones she co-founded United Curators collective. In 2019 Fuchs curated the Input symposium on digital art at Lunchmeat Festival in Prague and co-curated the "Persisting Realities" exhibition and "The Work of Art in the Age of Artificial Intelligence" workshop at CTM Festival in Berlin. Fuchs is co-producer of Gamma festival of music, art and urban culture.

== Selected curation projects ==
=== Research and education ===
Fuchs' professional interests include contemporary culture, media art, cinema and sound. She was teaching Media Art History at Moscow State University since 2017 and Art & Science at ITMO University since 2018. In 2017 Fuchs also curated an Art & Science educational program for teenagers in NCCA. In 2018 Fuchs was giving lectures in Avant-Garde LAB curator school launched by Denis Semyonov in Jewish Museum and Tolerance Center. Fuchs ran workshops, gave public talks and lectures in Tokyo University of the Arts, Miraikan — The National Museum of Emerging Science and Innovation, at The New Media Lab at the New Stage of Alexandrinsky Theatre, SMENA Contemporary Culture Centre in Kazan. She also curates Gamma LAB_AI, the laboratory on AI and music in frame of Gamma Festival of music and contemporary art and Gamma_pro annual art & technology forum she produces in Saint Petersburg, Russia Additionally Fuchs consults other institutions such as ZKM ("Open Codes" curated by Peter Weibel) and Barbican Centre ("AI: More That Human" curated by Majolo Uchida) as Art Advisor.

=== Exhibitions ===
- December 2014 — Playing Hopscotch, Garage Museum of Contemporary Art, Moscow. An annual exhibition of works created by participants of "Polytech.Science.Art: Science. Art. Technologies" interdisciplinary program of Polytechnic Museum in 2014.
- December 2015 — On The Origin of New, Garage Museum of Contemporary Art, Moscow. An exhibition of works by 2015 "Polytech.Science.Art: Science. Art. Technologies" interdisciplinary program participants within Polytech.Science.Art.Week.
- January 2016 — Crystal. Reconstruction, SMENA Contemporary Culture Center, Kazan. A project within Polytech.Science.Art Week dedicated to a unique audio-visual musical instrument created in 1964 by Bulat Galeev from Prometheus Institute and recreated by Russian media artist ::vtol:: and Berlin-based artist and composer Peter Kirn.
- September 2016 — EARTH LAB, Red October, Moscow. An exhibition project produced by Polytechnic Museum and Ars Electronica Export and dedicated to social, ecological and economic phenomena that impact the future of Earth.
- December 2017 — TECHNE.Prologue, National Centre for Contemporary Arts, Moscow. A pilot exhibition of TECHNE Initiative curated by Fuchs that includes exhibitions, workshops, performances, open labs and other events devoted to technological practices in contemporary art.
- June 2018 — Everyday Transformations, Vyksa Steel Works, Vyksa. An exhibition within ART-OVRAG contemporary art festival that featured works by Helena Nikonole, ::vtol:: and Ildar Yakubovich in the field of scientific art.
- June 2018 — Humanity Proof, VDNKh, Moscow. An exhibition that presented 6 young Russian sci-artists that participated in VDNKh's project Vzlet. The exhibition took place inside Yakovlev Yak-42 plane located at VDNKh's Industry Square.
- January 2019 — Persisting Realities, Kunstraum Kreuzberg, Berlin. An exhibition within CTM Festival so-curated by Fuchs, Martin Craciun, Nicole Gingras, Eric Mattson, and Antje Weitzel that presented various artistic interpretations and responses to 2019 festival's main theme of Persistence.
