= Meta Mayne Reid =

Northern Irish children's writer

- Born: 1905; Yorkshire
- Died: 1991 (aged 85–86); County Down

Meta Mayne Reid (1905–1991) was a Northern Irish children's writer.

== Early life and education ==
Meta Mayne Reid was born to Marcus and Elvina Hopkins in Woodlesford, Yorkshire in 1905 and grew up there although her family was from Ulster in Ireland. She had one sister, Audrey. She was educated at home through governesses before going to Leeds Girls' High School. Mayne Reid went on to attend Manchester University. Later she moved to Crawfordsburn in County Down when her parents returned to the north of Ireland and there she was married to Dr E. Mayne Reid.

== Work ==
It was in Ulster that she set most of her novels, both historical fiction and modern settings with a fantasy side. She wrote more than twenty children's novels as well as two novels for adults and one collection of poetry. Reid was involved with the Belfast chapter of PEN as both secretary and, from 1970 to 1972, president.

== Bibliography ==
=== Novels ===
- The Land Is Dear, 1936
- Far-Off Fields Are Green, 1937

=== Children's books ===
- Phelim and the Creatures, 1952
- Carrigmore Castle, 1954
- All Because of Dawks, 1955
- Dawks Does It Again, 1956
- The Cuckoo at Coolnean, 1956
- Tiffany and the Swallow Rhyme, 1956
- Dawks on Robbers' Mountain, 1957
- Dawks and the Duchess, 1958
- Strangers in Carrigmore, 1958
- The McNeills at Rathcapple, 1959
- Storm on Kildoney, 1961
- Sandy and the Hollow Book, 1961
- The Tobermillin Oracle, 1962
- With Angus in the Forest, 1963
- The Tinkers' Summer, 1965
- The Silver Fighting Cocks, 1966
- The House at Spaniard's Bay, 1967
- The Glen Beyond the Door, 1968
- The Two Rebels, 1969
- Beyond the Wide World's End, 1972
- The Plotters of Pollnashee, 1973
- Snowbound by the Whitewater, 1975
- The Noguls and the Horse, 1976
- A Dog Called Scampi, 1980

=== Poetry ===
- No Ivory Tower, 1974
