= Sola David-Borha =

Nigerian banker

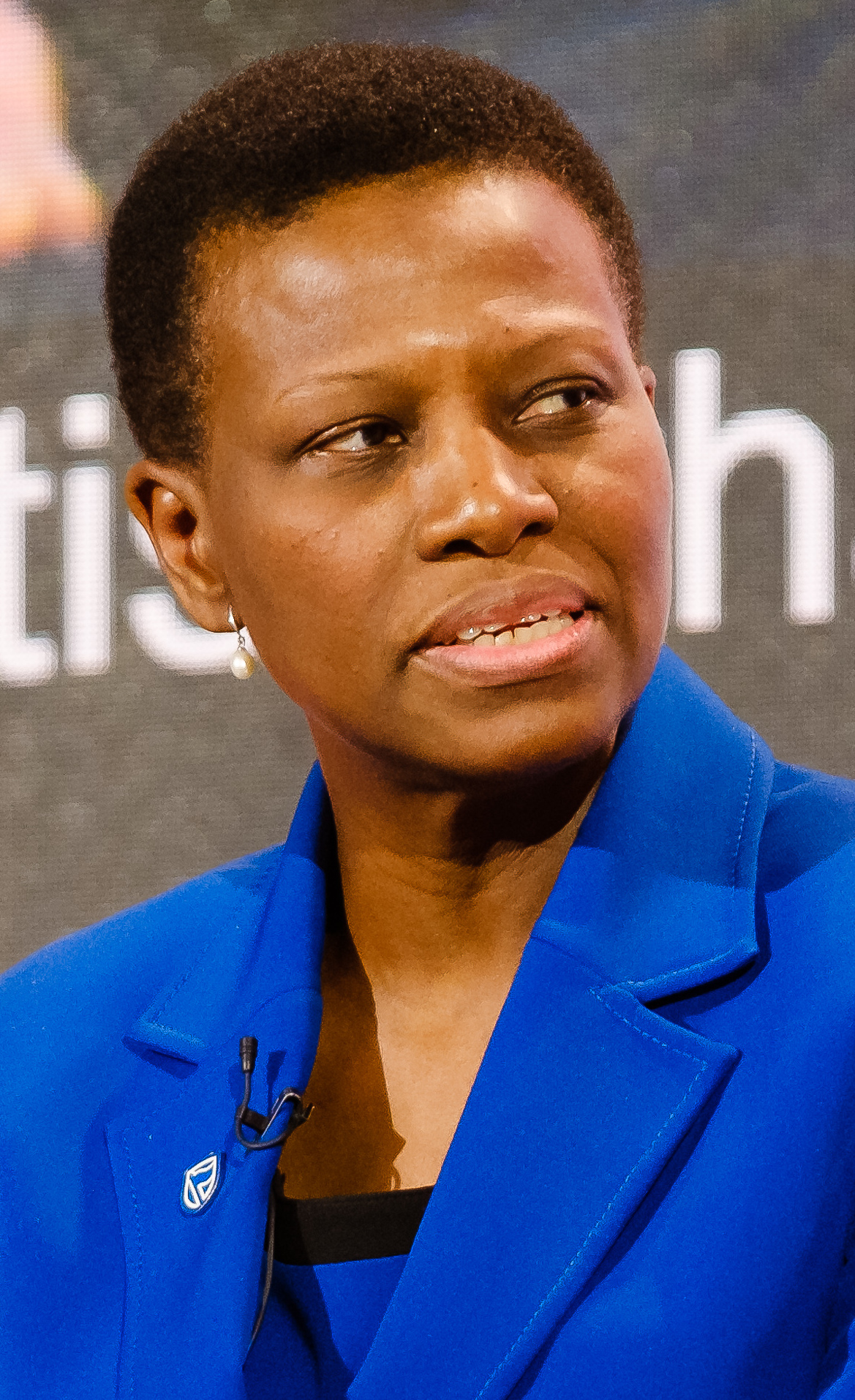
- David-Borha in 2020
- Born: Olusola Adejoke; Accra, Ghana
- Education: University of Ibadan; Manchester Business School
- Occupations: Chairman, Board of Stanbic IBTC Holdings
- Board member of: Nigerian Economic Summit Group; University of Ibadan Business School; Redeemer's University; Coca-Cola HBC AG
- Spouse: Married

Olusola "Sola" Adejoke David-Borha, is the former chief executive (CEO) of Africa Regions at the Standard Bank Group, a position she retired from in 2021. Currently, she is the Chairman of the Board of Stanbic IBTC Holdings. She was the CEO of Stanbic IBTC Holdings until January 2017 and was deputy CEO and executive director of corporate & investment banking. She was the CEO of Stanbic IBTC Bank Plc from May 2011 to November 2012, and was head of investment banking for Africa (excluding South Africa). She is the vice chairman of the Nigerian Economic Summit Group since 2015. She joined the board of IBTC in July 1994. She has been a non-executive director of Coca-Cola HBC AG since June 2015. She was a director at Stanbic IBTC Holdings PLC from 1994 to March 2017. She is a member of the governing council of the Redeemer's University.

== Early life and education ==
David-Borha was born in Accra, Ghana to a diplomat father, which meant the family travelled a lot. The family returned to Nigeria when she was about 10 years old. Sola undertook her primary and secondary education in Nigeria before completing her studies at the University of Ibadan, Nigeria with a bachelor's degree in economics in 1981. She then proceeded to pursue an MBA from the Manchester Business School in 1991. Her executive education includes the Advanced Management Program at Harvard Business School and the Global CEO Program jointly offered by Wharton, IESE and CEIBS.

She is an honorary fellow of the Chartered Institute of Bankers of Nigeria (CIBN).

== Career ==
David-Borha began her career at NAL Merchant Bank (now Sterling Bank), then affiliated with American Express from 1984 to 1989, before joining a boutique investment banking firm, IBTC, which was merged with two commercial banks to become IBTC Chartered in 2005. In 2007, Standard Bank Group acquired IBTC and became known as Stanbic IBTC Holdings, where she was deputy chief executive of the bank (Stanbic IBTC Bank) and head of international banking coverage in Africa (excluding South Africa), becoming chief executive of Stanbic IBTC Bank in 2011 and chief executive of Stanbic IBTC Holdings in 2012. In January 2017, she took up the position as the chief executive of the Standard Bank Group.

She is a non-executive director of CR Services Credit Bureau PLC and the University of Ibadan Business School. She joined the board of IBTC in July 1994. She has been a non-executive director of Coca-Cola HBC AG since June 2015. She is a director of Fate Foundation, Redeemer's International Secondary School. She is a member of the governing council of the Redeemer's University.

In September 2020, Stanbic IBTC Holdings appointed David-Borha as a non-executive director.

On 15 April 2021, David-Borha retired after 31 years at Stanbic IBTC, and was replaced as CEO Standard Bank Africa Regions, by Yinka Sanni, hitherto the CEO of Stanbic IBTC Holdings Plc.

== Awards and recognitions ==
She was named Business Woman of the Year for the West Africa region in 2016 at the All Africa Business Leaders Awards. She was also named Business Woman of the Year for Africa.

== Personal life ==
David-Borha is a devout Christian and a pastor at the Redeemed Christian Church of God - City of David in Lagos, Nigeria. She is married to Mr David-Borha and a mother of three children.
