= Nicholas Thatcher =

Nicholas Thatcher is Professor of Oncology at the University of Manchester, in the School of Cancer and Imaging Sciences at the Christie Hospital NHS Trust and Wythenshawe Hospital; he was appointed to the position of Professor in 1996. He received his PhD from Manchester University, after prior education at the University of Cambridge and St Bartholomew’s Hospital Medical College, London.

His specialty is clinical and translational research in renal cell cancer, melanoma and lung cancer.

He was investigator in key clinical trials dealing with chemotherapy methods and dosages in small cell lung cancer and non-small cell lung cancer. He has written several hundred peer-reviewed papers in major scientific medical journals and has directed several PhD theses. He is joint editor of the textbook, New perspectives in lung cancer / edited by Nick Thatcher and Stephen Spiro., 2nd ed, Edited by Martin Muers, Nicholas Thatcher, Francis Wells & Andrew Miles. London : BMJ Publishing, 1994. ISBN 0-7279-0786-7.

His most cited papers, according to Google Scholar are:

- Molecular Predictors of Outcome With Gefitinib in a Phase III Placebo-Controlled Study in Advanced Non–Small-Cell Lung Cancer, by Fred R. Hirsch, Marileila Varella-Garcia, Paul A. Bunn, Jr, Wilbur A. Franklin, Rafal Dziadziuszko, Nick Thatcher, Alex Chang, Purvish Parikh, José Rodrigues Pereira, Tudor Ciuleanu, Joachim von Pawel, Claire Watkins, Angela Flannery, Gillian Ellison, Emma Donald, Lucy Knight, Nicholas Botwood, Brian Holloway
- Randomized Phase III Study of Temozolomide Versus Dacarbazine in the Treatment of Patients With Advanced Metastatic Malignant Melanoma, Journal of Clinical Oncology, Vol 24, No 31 (November 1), 2006: pp. 5034–5042, by M. R. Middleton, J. J. Grob, N. Aaronson, G. Fierlbeck, W. Tilgen, S. Seiter, M. Gore, S. Aamdal, J. Cebon, A. Coates, B. Dreno, M. Henz, D. Schadendorf, A. Kapp, J. Weiss, U. Fraass, P. Statkevich, M. Muller, N. Thatcher, Journal of Clinical Oncology, Vol 18, Issue 1 (January), 2000: 158-
