= William Low =

Scottish chain of supermarkets

William Low & Co plc

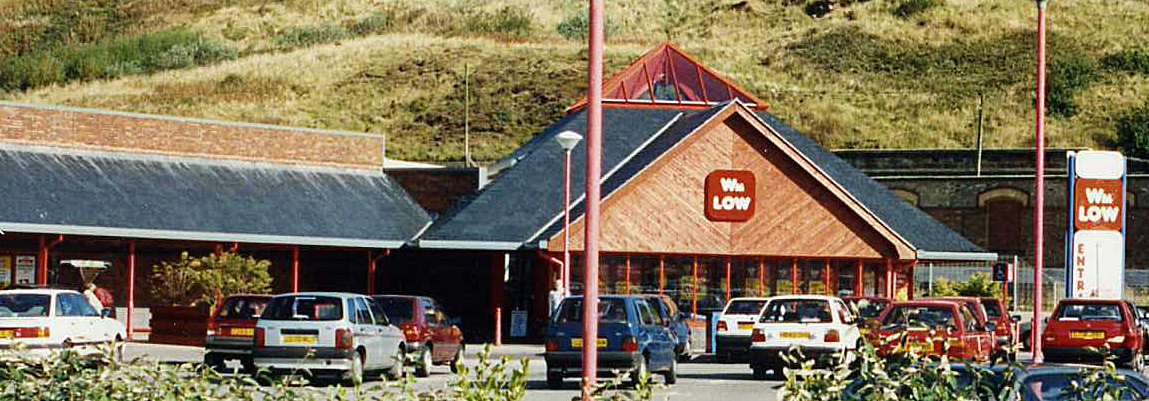
- Wm Low store in Whitehaven, Cumbria (1994)
- Industry: Retail
- Founded: 1868
- Founder: James Low; William Low; William Rettie
- Defunct: 2 September 1994
- Fate: Taken over by Tesco
- Successor: Tesco
- Headquarters: Dundee, Scotland, UK
- Key people: Philip Rettie; Ian Stewart; James Millar
- Products: Groceries
- Number of employees: 8,981
- Subsidiaries: Lowfreeze; McTatties

William Low & Co plc, popularly referred to as Willie Low's and latterly marketed as Wm Low, was a chain of supermarkets headquartered in Dundee, Scotland. Initially founded in 1868, Low's had branches throughout Scotland, North East England, Cumbria and Yorkshire. As a group, it was smaller than most of its competitors and often served small towns, although it still had several large hypermarkets. The company used to trade on its Scottishness as a unique selling point in Scotland. At one stage, the company also ran a chain of frozen food stores known as Lowfreeze. Lowfreeze was sold in 1987 to Bejam.

The remaining business was purchased by Tesco for £257M in 1994. Tesco had to compete with rival competitor Sainsbury's for the chain, with both companies looking to expand their foothold in Scotland. Following on from the takeover, the 57 William Low stores were converted to Tesco. Prior to this, there were only around 17 Tesco branches in Scotland. The purchase of Wm Low by Tesco moved them to the largest supermarket chain in the United Kingdom, beating Sainsbury's for the first time.

== Early years ==
James Low, who was born near Kirriemuir in 1849, completed a grocery apprenticeship in Kirriemuir before moving to Dundee in 1866. Two years later, with a £300 loan from Clydesdale Bank, he opened his own grocery store at 19 Hunter Street. By 1870, he was listed in the Dundee Directory as a grocery, tea and wine merchant at 11–13 Hunter Street. At this point, James's younger brother, William, joined the business at the age of 12. A year later, James Low and William Lindsay, a local preserve, confectionery and bakery manufacturing business owner, formed a partnership, Low & Lindsay, and by 1874 they had a further branch at 304 Perth Road and had moved into wholesaling. In 1879, William Low bought the business and it was renamed William Low & Co. By 1881, the Dundee Directory listed the business as wholesale grocers and wine merchants, and the business had seven branches across Dundee. In 1884, the company opened a warehouse and headquarters at Blackness Road.

In 1885, William Rettie joined Low in partnership. Rettie was described in the 1877 Dundee Directory as a grocery and tea dealer, with stores in Rosebank Street and Dudhope Street. Rettie had married Low's sister, Annie, in 1884. The Dundee Directory of 1885 had listed that the company had eight stores. In 1888, the company opened a wholesale department in Glasgow which facilitated the opening of six stores in the city by 1895, and the expansion of the business to 46 stores across different towns, including Crieff, Inverness and Stirling. The company further expanded two years later when they purchased Farrquar and Farrell, an Edinburgh-based tea and provision merchant, for £5,000. The company continued to expand, and by the turn of the century, the business had 64 stores spread between Hawick in the south to Dingwall in the Highlands. In 1917, the company became a private limited company, with William Low as chairman. The business not only had grocery stores, but their own bakery, bottling factory and butchery departments producing goods. William Rettie died in 1922, and was replaced as managing director by his son, Archibald, while William Low died in 1936, a year after his only son. At the start of World War II, Low's had 84 branches. It was one of the larger grocery multiples, but still far smaller than the giant of Home and Colonial Stores.

== After World War II ==
By 1951, the company had recorded pre-tax profits of £57,013. In the same year, Archibald died and would be replaced by his nephew Philip Rettie, joined by William Low's grandson Ian Stewart, as joint managing directors in 1953. During the 1950s, the company started a modernisation programme with the business closing smaller non-profitable stores, replacing them with larger stores, and in 1958 opened its first self-service store, in Bellshill, as an experiment. A year later, James Millar joined as the company's financial controller. By 1960, the self-service experiment had grown to nine stores, and by a year later reported that they accounted for 34% of the company's sales. The company, however, did not follow other multiples, keeping a similar line as Sainsbury's by not adopting the issuing of trading stamps.

The company quickly expanded its self-service stores, and by 1962 the business operated 26 of them out of its portfolio of 75, with some branches having off-licences, and larger stores getting in-store butcher counters. With the increase in turnover seen at self-service stores, the company opened their first supermarkets in Aberdeen and Broughty Ferry in 1963, following these up with further supermarkets opening in Lochee, Wishaw, Arbroath, Corstorphine, Fort William, Helensburgh and Kirkcaldy. At the same time, older stores were being closed. Sandy Leslie, who became the company's retail director, stated that it was square-footage of stores, not the number of branches, by which the new criteria was measured; however, as the boss of fellow grocery chain Moores Stores also stated, the cost of developing supermarkets was expensive; there were too many supermarkets to be successful. By the end of 1969, the company had modernised the store portfolio and had nineteen supermarkets, eighteen self-service stores and five counter-service shops, a reduction of 33 stores from the total in 1962. Supermarkets in 1969 accounted for 78% of the company's profits, with the business making a pre-tax profit of £260,180, but the profit margin was being squeezed by the growth of supermarket rivals.

== Modernisation and growth ==
Logo used during the 1970s and early 1980s (black and white version)

The company continued to grow its supermarket portfolio, and by 1972 it had grown to 31, with ten self-service stores, an increase of floorspace of 25%. James Millar stated that none of their stores were older than fifteen years. This was further accentuated with the opening of a new head office and distribution centre, at Dryburgh Industrial Estate in Dundee in October 1972, which incorporated modern data processing and warehousing methods. The company became a public limited company in 1973, launching on to the London Stock Exchange. In 1975, the company launched the first Scottish freezer chain with the opening of the first Lowfreeze store in Glenrothes. The company opened its largest supermarket to date in 1976, with a brand new store in Irvine. This was followed by the 1978 opening of the company's first superstore, in Perth, at the cost of £1.5 million. The company moved into the low end of the market in 1976, when they launched their Discount Price Policy, which was a year earlier than Tesco's own Operation Checkout. By 1980, the average size of the stores had doubled since 1972, with the company having 46 supermarkets and thirteen Lowfreeze stores. Lowfreeze by this point were generating over £5 million of the company's £74 million turnover (compared to a £9 million turnover in 1970), but the company's profit margins had fallen from 4.1% in 1970 to 2.4% by 1980.

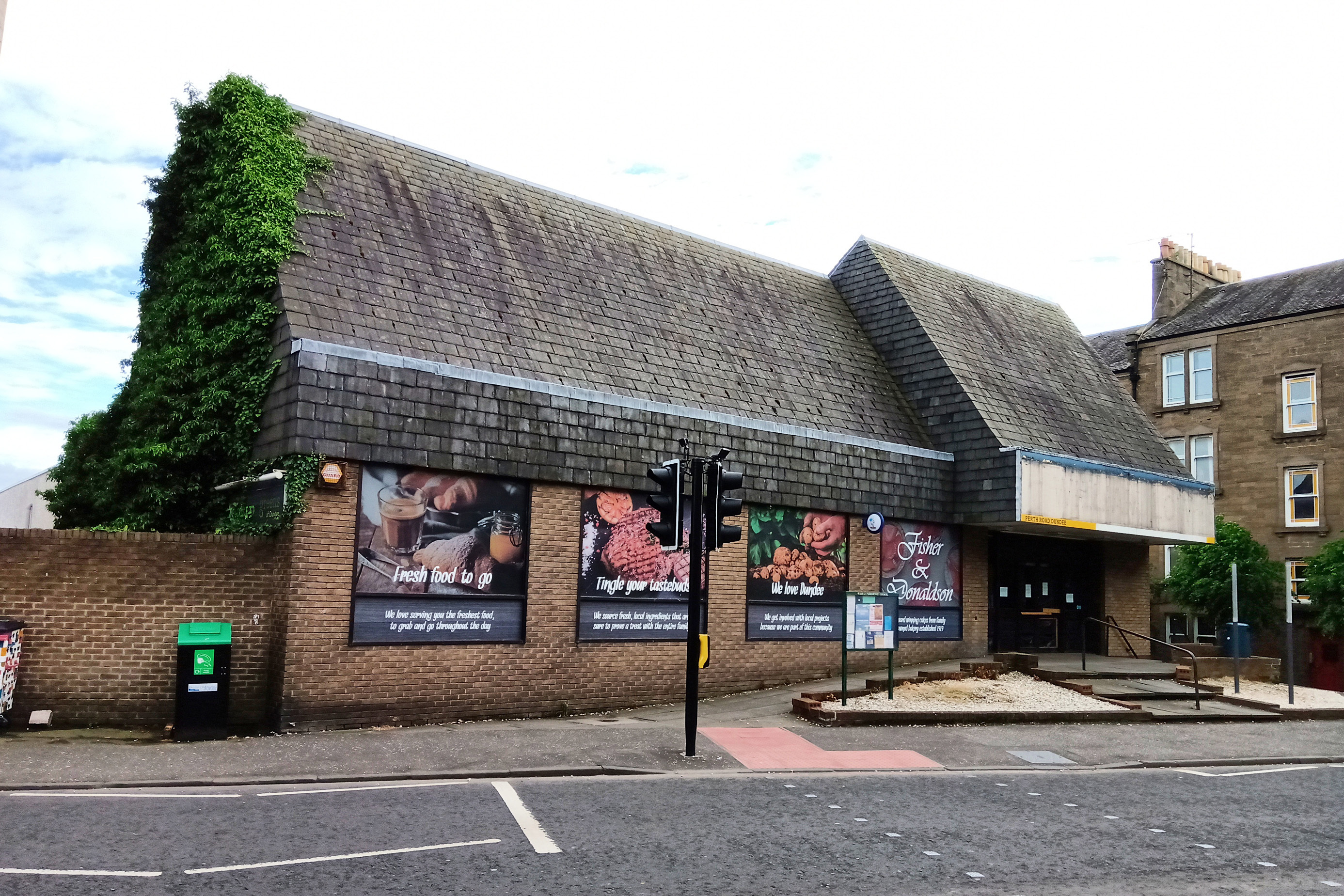
This shop in Dundee was originally opened as a William Low branch in the late 1970s. (Following the removal of newer signs, faint traces from the original "William Low" lettering are visible.)

Low's continued to grow in the 1980s, included replacing stores, such as in Kirkcaldy, where a new superstore was opened in 1981. That outlet not only sold food but also sold non-grocery products, such as bedding, and had a 125-seater restaurant. Further developments included the new 10,000-square-foot (930 m^{2}) store at the junction of Queensferry Road and Kings Road in Rosyth, a 20,000-square-foot (1,900 m^{2}) store in Baltic Chambers, Grangemouth and further new stores in Wishaw, Oban and Linlithgow which opened in 1982. Low's moved into the fast-food business in 1981, with the opening of McTatties, with restaurants opening in Glasgow and Edinburgh; however, this was unsuccessful and closed just a year later at a write down of £775,000. During 1982, it was reported that Hintons, another supermarket chain, were planning a takeover of Low's, and the current market valuation was £12 million. Wm Low also rose to be included as number 400 in The Times 1000, a list of top UK companies, in 1984, whereas in 1976 it was not even listed.

In 1984, Wm Low attempted but failed to take over Hintons, which later became part of Argyll Group. By 1984, the company had reduced the number of stores, with WM Low's having 45 and Lowfreeze having dropped from a high of 17 to 16; however, the average size of their stores had grown from 6,000 square feet (560 m^{2}) in 1980 to 11,000 square feet (1,000 m^{2}), and turnover had grown to £150 million by 1984. The company had now an estimated 10% of the Scottish grocery market and had seen profit margins rise to 3.5%. In 1985, Wm Low took over Laws Stores at a cost of £6.8 million. Laws had a group predominantly based in the north-east of England with a portfolio of smaller stores than Wm Low. James Millar said of the deal:

We are no longer confined to Scotland's 5 million population as our market - we have broken out of that restriction to an almost limitless growth potential for the future.

Laws was not the only acquisition that Low's tried to complete in 1985, with discussions held with Hillards that went no further. In 1985, Philip Rettie retired, leaving Ian Stewart, now deputy chairman, as the only family member on the board, with the finance director James Millar taking on the role of managing director. During 1986, Wm Low closed unprofitable Laws stores, but the company's profits fell by £400,000, dragged down by Laws performance. In 1987, Wm Low sold its frozen-food chain, Lowfreeze, to Bejam for £3.8 million, as it was only providing £10 million to the company's £233 million turnover. During the same year, Low's lost out to Argyll Group in bidding for the UK business of Safeway.

During 1988, Ian Stewart, the final family member on the board, retired. In April 1989, Wm Low attempted a friendly take over of Budgens, a small supermarket chain based mainly in the South East of England. The bid was withdrawn in May, after it was discovered that Budgens' loan commitments were greater than had previously been reported. The pulling out of the takeover had cost Low's £2.5 million as a result of fees and having to pay for underwriting commitments which were no longer required. The company opened new stores in Dumfries and Northallerton. In the 1988–89 trading year, Low's turnover exceeded £300 million for the first time, and the company's profit margin had increased to 5.8%. Low's, by the start of the decade, had 46 stores and 276,000 square feet (25,600 m^{2}); however, by the end of the 1980s the company had 63 supermarkets and 713,000 square feet (66,200 m^{2}) of selling space. The business, at this point, was the tenth-largest Scottish company.

In 1990, Low's were in discussion with Isosceles, owners of Gateway Supermarkets, to purchase 81 stores for £212 million, with some to be sold off to the Co-operative Wholesale Society to help fund the move, but this fell through as Low's did not want to take on Gateway's smaller outdated stores. The company floated a rights issue in December 1990 which raised £37.2 million. £12 million of this was used to develop a new multi-temperate distribution centre in Livingston and updating the company's computer systems. In 1991, the company made a pre-tax profit of £23.6 million, but in 1992 they had fallen to £19 million, even though the company had invested in five news stores, including Milngavie and Whitehaven, which had added a further 100,000 square feet (9,300 m^{2}) of retailing space to the company. The company chairman told shareholders:

We are trading in very difficult conditions, in which the company, faced significant new competition in the new year from mainstream multiples and discounters.

Expansion into the north and midlands of England was a priority, with the £12 million, 30,000 sq ft (2,800 m^{2}) Loughborough store opening in 1993. The company announced that this was the furthest south that the business would grow to, as it was at the limit of the company's distribution network. The business also opened new stores in Montrose, Tayside, Ilkeston, Campbeltown, Dundee and completed an extension to the Linlithgow store; however, during the year, the company started discussions with Safeway about a store swap, with Low's trading some of their bigger stores for Safeway's smaller units in more preferential geographical areas, but nothing came of it. The stockbroker Hoare Govett stated in their April 1994 circular they saw Low's as neither a genuine superstore operator nor a genuine discounter.

The Scottish Business Insider quoted that Low's yearly performance figures for the 1990s were:

- 1991: £354 million turnover, £21 million profit
- 1992: £394 million turnover, £23 million profit
- 1993: £253 million turnover, £20 million profit
- 1994: £446 million turnover, £21 million profit

Staff numbers at Low's, prior to the takeover, had been reasonably static: from 8,799 employees in 1991 to 8,981 in 1994.

== Takeover by Tesco ==
The takeover battle for William Low started on 14 July 1994, when Tesco announced its formal bid of £154 million for the company to dramatically improve its Scottish portfolio and an assurance it would not cherry pick the best stores. Two weeks later, J Sainsbury launched a counter-bid of £210 million, with chairman David Sainsbury stating:

Sainsbury was in the strongest position to unlock the potential of Low's stores. 'Our offer provides a fair price to Wm Low's investors and if accepted will provide a good return on investment to our shareholders.

Sainsbury was keen to gain a stronger foothold in Scotland, having only three stores in Scotland at the time of the bid. Tesco, at the time, had 7.1% of the Scottish grocery market, while Sainsbury's had 4.9%, against Low's 6.6%. Analysis at the time predicted that the cost, although fourteen times what Low's earnings were, would be the same as building 25 new stores. Analysts reported that Sainsbury's were interested in Low's seventeen larger stores and its distribution centres, with Sainsbury's suggesting they had received bids for some of the smaller stores.

The Argyll Group, owners of Safeway and Scotland's biggest grocery retailer, announced in July 1994 that it would not be making a bid for Wm Low. Tesco reacted with an improved offer of £247 million and Sainsbury's withdrew from the battle, with David Sainsbury stating:

The original price Tesco offered for Wm Low made it fairly cheap. At the price Tesco will be paying now, we believe it can't possibly make a decent return.

At the time, Tesco products were, on average, 9% cheaper than Low's, with analysts predicting that Tesco could lift the company's profits by £15 million; however, Tesco also had to take on Low's debt, which stood at £77 million. Tesco formally took over Wm Low on 2 September 1994 for a total sum of £257 million, ending 126 years of business. The purchase of Wm Low doubled Tesco's Scottish market share from 7.6% to 15.3% in 1995. After the takeover, The Financial Times questioned why Low's share price only rose from 138p in April to 169p in July, when Tesco paid 360p, and was their something wrong with the financial community's ability to value such quoted companies?

Tesco closed the Dundee headquarters of Wm Low, with the loss of 300 jobs, opening a smaller Tesco Scottish office to deal with local suppliers that employed twenty people. A re-fit programme followed, and Tesco scanning tills were installed at every store by August 1995, with the refit being completed by the end of 1996 at a cost of £35 million. At the time of the Tesco takeover, a number of new Wm Low Stores were earmarked for development. These were ultimately launched as Tescos but had been planned by Wm Low. This included Aviemore, Cupar, Falkirk and Dunblane, opened between 1995 and 1996.

The distribution centre at the Dryburgh Estate in Dundee became the Tesco customer-service centre and one of two Scottish distribution depots for Tesco. In 2006, Tesco announced the closure of the Dundee depot to create a new centre in Livingston, on the site of the former NEC factory, which would also replace the current distribution centre already based in Livingston (now open as of October 2007). The adjacent customer-service centre was unaffected by the closure. The warehouse at Dundee was demolished in 2019.

Prior to the takeover, sales had been falling at a rate of 6%, a figure that Tesco reversed to a growth of 25% at the end of 1994–95 in the former Low's stores.

== 1964 Aberdeen typhoid outbreak ==
On 6 and 7 May 1964, the Aberdeen branch delicatessen used a tin of Argentinian corned beef that had not been processed properly (and was infected with typhoid). The meat was sliced using a communal deli slicer, resulting in approximately 500 people in the city having suspected typhoid. Wm Low was never successful in the city again, with their branch closing in the city three years later.
