= Masood Entrepreneurship Centre =

The Masood Entrepreneurship Centre, previously the Masood Enterprise Centre (MEC) and the Manchester Science Enterprise Centre (MSEC), is an organisation at the University of Manchester that focuses on stimulating enterprise and entrepreneurship. It was launched in 2000, with help from the Science Enterprise Challenge Fund. The centre offers a range of undergraduate and postgraduate elective units to students from any subject background.
