= Karen Cook (banker) =

British banker

- Born: 1952 or 1953 (age 72–73); London, England
- Education: Alliance Manchester Business School
- Occupation: Banker
- Title: Chair of the investment banking division of Goldman Sachs
- Spouse: Patrick Drayton
- Children: 6

Karen Cook' (born 1952/1953) is a British banker who chairs the investment banking division of Goldman Sachs.

== Early life ==
Karen Cook was born and raised in London, the only child of a car mechanic father.

== Career ==
Cook started her career in the Foreign Office, but found it "too bureaucratic and slow". She then earned an MBA from Alliance Manchester Business School, and joined First National Bank of Chicago. She moved to Schroders in 1988.

Cook joined Goldman Sachs in 1999 as head of UK investment banking and became a partner in 2000.

In 2004, she became a director of Tesco.

In 2015, Cook became Goldman Sachs' global investment banking division co-chair.

Cook has been called the "Queen of M&A", having advised BG Group on its planned £47 billion takeover by Shell.

== Personal life ==
Cook is married to fellow banker Patrick Drayton, and they have six children.
