= Journal of Management Studies =

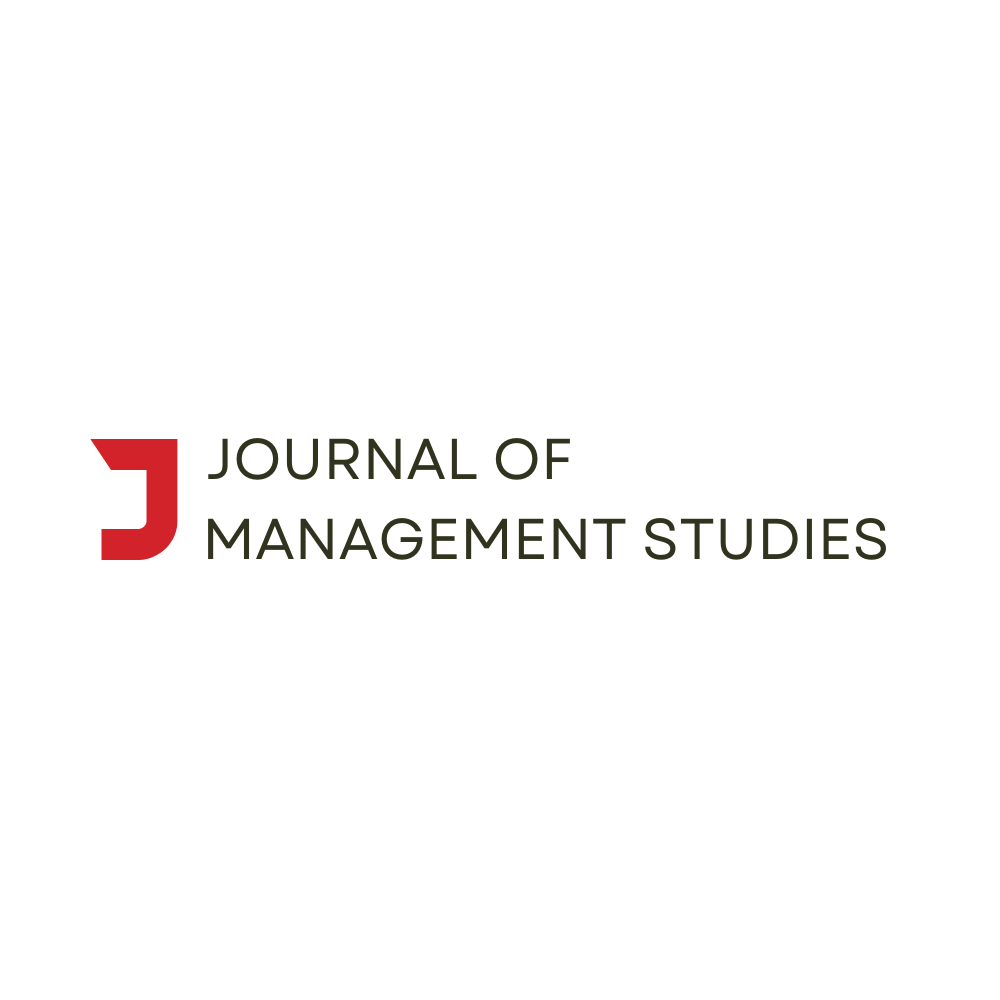
- Discipline: Management Studies
- Language: English

Publication details
- History: 1963–present
- Publisher: Wiley-Blackwell on behalf of the Society for the Advancement of Management Studies
- Frequency: 8/year
- Impact factor: 10.5 (2022)

Standard abbreviations
- ISO 4: J. Manag. Stud.

Indexing
- ISSN: 1467-6486
- OCLC no.: 784233522

Links
- Journal homepage; Online access; Online archive

The Journal of Management Studies is a peer-reviewed academic journal that was established in 1963 and is published by Wiley-Blackwell on behalf of the Society for the Advancement of Management Studies. The journal publishes both conceptual and empirical papers in the field of management. Specific areas of focus include, organizational theory and behaviour, strategic management, human resource management, and cross-cultural comparisons of organizational effectiveness.

The current general editors are Corinne Post (Villanova University), Kristina Potočnik (University of Edinburgh), and Johann Fortwengel (King's College London).

The current associate editors are Paolo Aversa (King's College London), Patrick Haack (University of Lausanne), Mirko Benischke (Erasmus University), William Schulze (University of Utah), Hannes Leroy (Erasmus University), Lin Cui (Australian National University), Chidiebere Ogbonnaya (King's College London). Beatrice D'Ippolito (University of York), Shameen Prashantham (CEIBS), Claudia Gabbioneta (University of York), Yasin Rofcanin (University of Bath), Dimitrios Georgakakis (University of Leeds), Garima Sharma (American University), Peter Gianodis (Duquesne University), Tiffany Trzebiatowski (Colorado State University), and Qian (Cecilia) Gu (Georgia State University).

== Abstracting and indexing ==
The Journal of Management Studies is abstracted and indexed in the Social Sciences Citation Index, Scopus, ProQuest, EBSCO, Cambridge Scientific Abstracts, Research Papers in Economics, and Emerald Management Reviews. The Journal of Management Studies' ISI Journal Citation Reports 2022 Impact factor is 10.5, with a ranking of 15/155 in the category 'Business (Social Science)' and 16/227 in the category 'Management (Social Science)'. The journal was rated as an "A*" publication in the "Business and Management" category of the Australia Business Deans Council rankings and as a "Category 1" journal in the CNRS rankings.

== JMS Awards ==
JMS awards prizes each year to recognise noteworthy contributions to the journal:

- The Best Reviewer Award is awarded to the reviewer or reviewers in recognition of their contribution to the development of papers at JMS in the past year. The quality and number of reviews undertaken by each reviewer for JMS are the main criteria considered for this award.
- The Best Paper Award is awarded to the author(s) of the best paper published in JMS in the past year, as voted for by the Editors of JMS. Particular emphasis is placed on papers which are quirky, edgy, and interesting.
- The Karen Legge Prize is awarded in recognition of exceptional contribution by an early career academic. Academics who have received their PhD within the last 5 years are eligible for this prize and nominations are considered.

These awards are announced and presented at a reception at the annual Academy of Management conference.

== Grigor McClelland Dissertation Award ==
In 2011 the Journal of Management Studies launched the annual Grigor McClelland Dissertation Award, named after the journal's founding editor. The prize recognises authors who have published particularly innovative management scholarship in their PhD thesis. The winning author receives £5,000. The award is sponsored by the Society for the Advancement of Management Studies, and presented at the doctoral colloquium of the European Academy of Management. The Award "aims to promote and recognize innovative PhD research in management and organization studies" and "does not specify any preferences towards topics or methods". The Award's "primary focus is to recognize and award doctoral research that is expansive and imaginative in that it covers significantly new terrain or counters existing thinking within management and organisational research".

== The Society for the Advancement of Management Studies (SAMS) ==
The Journal of Management Studies is governed by a charity named the Society for the Advancement of Management Studies (SAMS), initially founded by Grigor McClelland in 1963 for this specific purpose. Since its foundation, it has considerably expanded its remit, in collaboration with the journal: it organises regular conferences, delivers awards, and co-operate with other bodies such as the British Academy of Management to award grants such as the SAMS/BAM Research and Capacity Building Grants. There are 17 trustees of the Society for the Advancement of Management Studies - including Bill Harley (chair), Sabina Siebert (deputy chair), Robert Blackburn (treasurer), Elena Antonacopoulou, Julia Balogun (the dean of the University of Liverpool School of Management), Andrew Corbett, Joep Cornelissen, Rick Delbridge, Timothy Devinney, Annabelle Gawer, Paula Jarzabkowski, Wendy Loretto (dean of the University of Edinburgh Business School), Terry McNulty, Klaus Meyer, Thomas Roulet, Bill Starbuck, Christos Tsinopoulos.
