= Dariusz Jemielniak =

Polish management academic (born 1975)

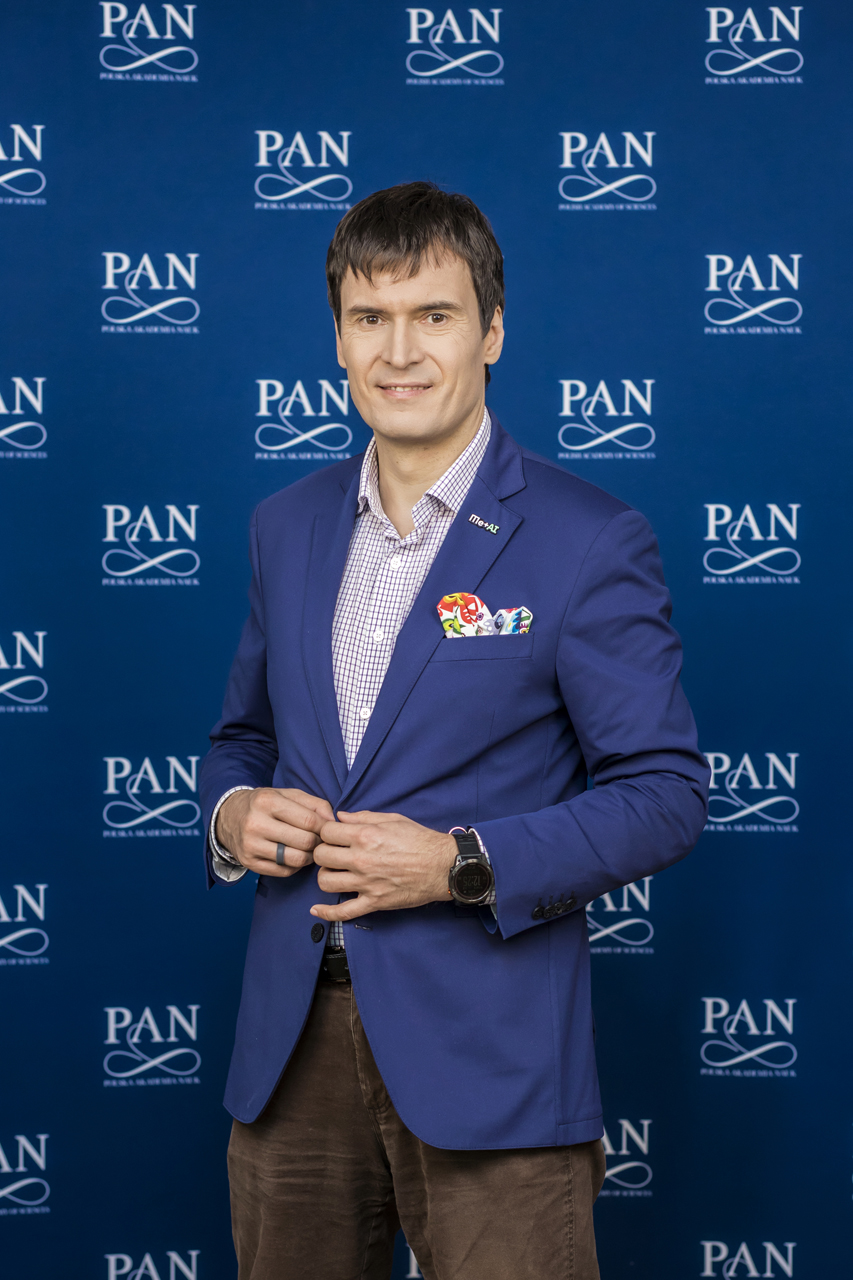
- Jemielniak in 2024
- Born: 17 March 1975 (age 51)
- Education: University of Warsaw
- Scientific career
- Fields: Management
- Workplaces: Kozminski University
- Website: www.jemielniak.org

Dariusz Jemielniak (born 17 March 1975) is a Polish professor of management at Kozminski University, faculty associate at the Berkman Klein Center for Internet & Society at Harvard University, and vice-president of Polish Academy of Sciences.

His interests revolve about social data science and collaborative society, open collaboration projects (such as Wikipedia or F/LOSS), strategy of knowledge-intensive organizations, virtual communities, and disinformation. In 2015, he was elected to the Wikimedia Foundation board of trustees and has served for three consecutive terms until 2025. In 2024 European Commission appointed him to the board of European Institute of Innovation and Technology.

== Career ==
He is a graduate of VI Liceum Ogólnokształcące im. Tadeusza Reytana w Warszawie and a 2000 summa cum laude graduate from the Faculty of Management, Warsaw University. In 2004, he earned a Ph.D. in management (as subfield of economics) from the Kozminski University, under the supervision of Andrzej Koźmiński. In 2014, he received his Professor's title from the President of Poland. He heads MINDS (Management in Networked and Digital Societies) department at Kozminski University.

In 2019, he was elected to the Polish Academy of Sciences, as the youngest member in social sciences and humanities in history, and in 2022 he became its youngest vice-president.

A visiting scholar at the Cornell University (2004–2005) Harvard University (2007, 2015–2016, 2019–2020), University of California Berkeley (2008), Harvard Law School (2011–2012), Massachusetts Institute of Technology (2015–2016, 2019–2020), Universidad Complutense de Madrid (2019), and others. Jemielniak received scholarships from, among others, Collegium Invisibile (1998), Foundation for Polish Science (2000-2001), Fulbright Program (2004), Kosciuszko Foundation (2007), as well as a scholarship for outstanding young scholars of the Polish Ministry of Science and Higher Education (2009), the academic scholarship from Polityka (2009), team award from the Ministry of Science and Higher Education for didactic work (2009), individual award of the Minister of Science and Higher Education for his post-doctoral work (2010). He was awarded the Medal of the Commission of National Education (2010) and the Mobility Plus scholarship from the Ministry of Science and Higher Education (2011). In 2018, he received the bronze Cross of Merit. In 2015, he received the Dorothy Lee Award from Media Ecology Association. In 2016, he received the academic excellence award from the President of Polish Academy of Sciences. In 2020, he received the academic merit award from Polish Prime Minister.

Since 2011, Jemielniak has been a non-paid member of the board of the Copernicus Science Centre in Warsaw. Since 2002 he has been a non-paid program board member at Nida Foundation, supporting English education of teachers in small towns and villages. Since 2016, he has been supporting the Equality Parade (Warsaw) and has been the honorary committee member.

He has researched and published books in the field of work-space studies about IT professionals and other knowledge workers. He has also published articles on organisational changes in higher education facilities and is an active participant in the debate on the reform of higher education in Poland. An experienced ethnographer and digital ethnographer, more recently he has been doing social data science, and advocating mixing digital ethnography with data science. He devised a mixed-method of 'Thick Big Data', described in a book published in 2020 by Oxford University Press.

=== Wikimedia ===
Within the Wikimedia movement, Jemielniak is involved in the Polish Wikipedia, where he has served in various roles, including as an administrator, bureaucrat and check-user. He was also a steward for all Wikimedia projects.

Jemielniak has voiced his support for the enabling of paid editing of Wikipedia under certain constraints, and has been vocal about reducing the bureaucracy within projects. He is an advocate of wider involvement of women and academics in the Wikimedia movement, and the need to start actively promoting its use and development in academia. In 2010, he published research on identity and roles in open source projects, in the form of participating ethnography.

He has authored a 2014 book on the social organization of Wikipedia, titled Common Knowledge?: An Ethnography of Wikipedia, The book was well received by critics and other scholars.

== Business ==
From 2003 to 2015, he founded, developed, and sold ling.pl, the largest online dictionary in Poland. In 2013 he co-founded InstaLing, a free educational platform for language educators used by over 200 thousand people. Since 2016, he has been a board member and a vice-chair of Escola S.A., a public traded company developing mobile apps and one of 100 fastest growing companies according to Clutch and Financial Times.

== Hobbies ==
He is a krav maga blackbelt and an instructor.

== Selected academic publications ==
- Jemielniak, Dariusz and Kociatkiewicz, Jerzy (ed.) (2008), Management Practices in High-tech Environments, Hershey-New York: Information Science Reference, ISBN 978-1-60566-176-6.
- Jemielniak, Dariusz and Kociatkiewicz, Jerzy (ed.) (2009), Handbook of Research on Knowledge-Intensive Organizations, Hershey-New York: Information Science Reference, ISBN 978-1-60566-176-6.
- Jemielniak, Dariusz (2012), The New Knowledge Workers, Cheltenham, UK – Northampton, US: Edward Elgar Publishing, ISBN 978-1-84844-753-0.
- Jemielniak, Dariusz and Marks, Abigail (ed.) (2012), Managing Dynamic Technology-Oriented Businesses: High-Tech Organizations and Workplaces, Hershey-New York: Information Science Reference, ISBN 978-1-4666-1836-7.
- Koźmiński, Andrzej K. and Jemielniak, Dariusz (2013) The New Principles of Management, Frankfurt – New York – Oxford: Peter Lang, ISBN 978-3-631-64252-8.
- Koźmiński, Andrzej K., Jemielniak, Dariusz, Jendrych, Elżbieta, and Wiśniewska, Halina (2014) Management matters, Warszawa: Wolters Kluwer ISBN 9788326431807.
- Jemielniak, Dariusz (ed.) (2014) Legal Professions at the Crossroads, New York: Peter Lang ISBN 978-3-631-64385-3.
- Jemielniak, Dariusz (ed.) (2014) The Laws of the Knowledge Workplace, Farnham – Burlington: Gower (Ashgate) ISBN 978-1-4724-2388-7.
- Jemielniak, Dariusz (2014) Common Knowledge? An Ethnography of Wikipedia, Stanford: Stanford University Press, ISBN 978-0-8047-8944-8.
- Jemielniak, Dariusz (2020) Thick Big Data: Doing Digital Social Sciences, Oxford: Oxford University Press ISBN 9780198839705.
- Jemielniak, Dariusz and Przegalińska, Aleksandra (2020) Collaborative Society, Cambridge, MA: MIT Press ISBN 9780262537919.
- Przegalińska, Aleksandra and Jemielniak, Dariusz (2023) Strategizing AI in Business and Education, Cambridge: Cambridge University Press, ISBN 9781009243551.
- Haber, Eldar, Jemielniak, Dariusz, Kurasiński, Artur, Przegalińska, Aleksandra (2025) Using AI in Academic Writing and Research: A Complete Guide to Effective and Ethical Academic AI, London-New York: Palgrave Macmillan, ISBN 978-3031917042.
- Koźmiński, Andrzej K., Jemielniak, Dariusz, Latusek-Jurczak, Dominika, Pikos, Anna (2025) Management: A European Perspective, New York: Routledge ISBN 9781032943312.
- Jemielniak, Dariusz (2026) Anti-Science, New York: Routledge ISBN 9781041212980.
