= Koźmiński (surname) =

Koźmiński is a Polish language surname of toponymic surname, derived from one of the Polish localities named Koźmin.

The surname may refer to:

- Andrzej Koźmiński (born 1943), professor of management and founder of Kozminski University
- Aaron Kosminski (born Aron Mordke Kozminski, 1865–1919), London Polish immigrant suspected of being Jack the Ripper
- Marek Koźmiński (born 1971), Polish footballer
- Leon Koźmiński (1904–1993), Polish economist
- Lucian Kozminski (1916–1993), Polish-born American convicted of swindling Holocaust survivors
