= Aleksandra Przegalińska =

Polish futurist (born 1982)

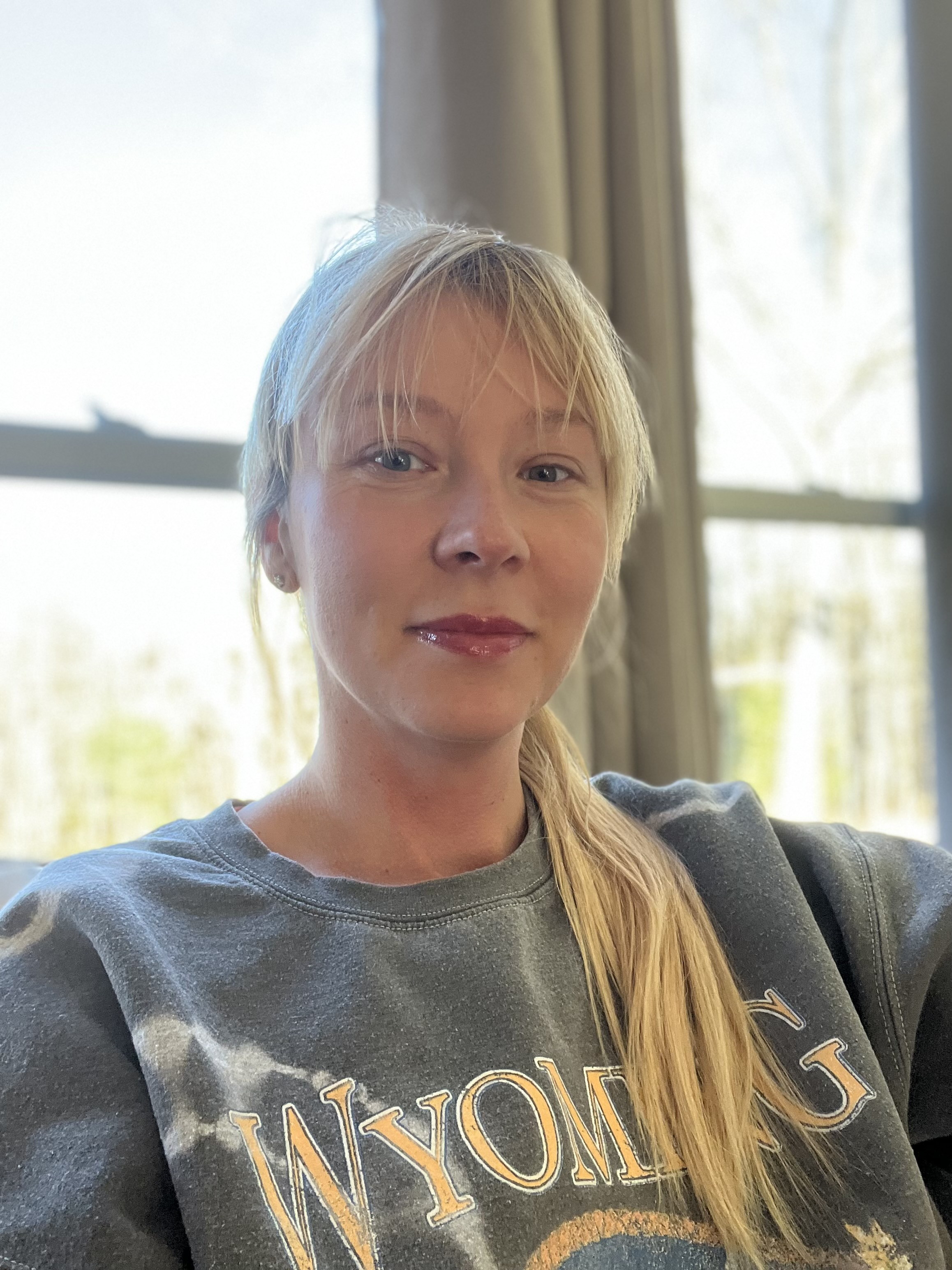
- Przegalińska in 2022
- Born: 18 January 1982 (age 44); Szczecin, Poland
- Occupations: Philosopher, Futurist

Academic background
- Education: University of Warsaw, The New School for Social Research

Academic work
- Discipline: philosophy, human-computer interaction, social studies of AI
- Institutions: Kozminski University

Aleksandra Katarzyna Przegalińska (Polish: [pʂɛɡaˈliɲska]; born 18 January 1982) is a Polish philosopher, AI researcher, academic administrator and futurist, specializing in artificial intelligence (AI), human-machine interaction, and digital society. She is a vice-rector for Innovation and AI at Kozminski University in Warsaw, where she also serves as Professor in the Department of Management in Digital and Networked Societies. Since April 2026, she has been a Fellow at the Center for Labor and a Just Economy (CLJE) at Harvard University, having previously served as Senior Research Associate at the same center since March 2022.

She is Principal Coordinator and Leader of the EUonAIR European University Alliance (Erasmus+, 2024-2028), a consortium of 16 institutions across Europe focused on integrating AI into higher education. Since February 2026, she is a member of the Council for the Future (in Polish, Rada ds. Przyszłości), an advisory body to the Prime Minister of Poland, Donald Tusk.

== Life ==
Przegalińska earned her Ph.D. in philosophy from the University of Warsaw in 2014, focusing on the phenomenology of virtual beings. She completed her habilitation in management and quality studies at Kozminski University in 2020. She is an alumna of The New School for Social Research in New York, where she conducted research on identity in virtual environments, such as Second Life.

Przegalińska was a research fellow at the American Institute for Economic Research and the Center for Collective Intelligence at Massachusetts Institute of Technology, where she explored human-AI collaboration and ethical frameworks for digital agents. Currently, she is a Senior Research Associate at the Center for Labor and a Just Economy at Harvard University. In 2023, she was appointed as a member of the Scientific Council at the European University Institute.

Her recent works include Collaborative society (MIT Press), a 2020 book with Dariusz Jemielniak, in which she discusses the cooperative turn in the society enabled by technology, and Wearable Technologies in Organizations: Privacy, Efficiency and Autonomy in Work (2019, Springer), in which she discusses the privacy and efficiency aspects of wearables in organizations. Her other books include Strategizing AI in Business and Education: Emerging Technologies and Business Strategy (Cambridge University Press, 2023), co-authored with Dariusz Jemielniak, and Converging Minds: The Creative Potential of Collaborative AI (CRC Press/Taylor & Francis, 2024), co-authored with Tamilla Triantoro.

She is a frequently invited expert in the Polish media, with interviews, among others, for Forbes, Gazeta Wyborcza, TVN, Bankier, Onet, Forsal, or Krytyka Polityczna.

=== Conferences and Public Engagement ===
She has presented her research at global events, including the World Economic Forum in Davos and South by Southwest (SXSW), where she addressed the ethical and regulatory implications of emerging AI technologies.

Przegalińska is a frequent contributor to Polish media. She is a host of a radio show about the future and technology, "Coś Osobliwego" (verbatim Something Particular, a wordplay in Polish meaning also Something Singular, referring to singularity). She also co-hosts as well as popular TV program "Szkło Kontaktowe". She has received several awards for science communication and digital leadership, including the Digital Shapers Award in Education (2018, 2024) and the Hortensja Award for popularizing science (2020).

=== Advisory Roles ===
Przegalińska serves as a scientific advisor to CampusAI, a Polish startup focused on AI education. She has consulted for the European Parliament.
