= Collegium Invisibile =

Academic society

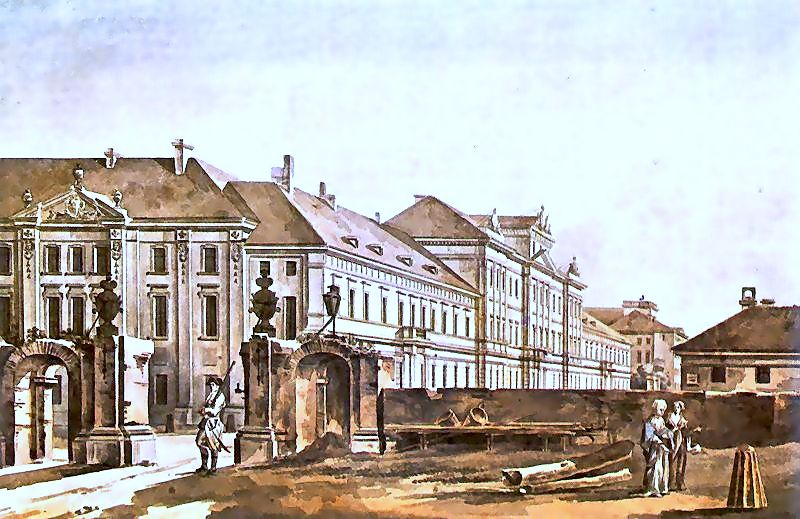
Collegium Invisibile refers to the tradition of the 18th century Collegium Nobilium run by the Piarists in Warsaw

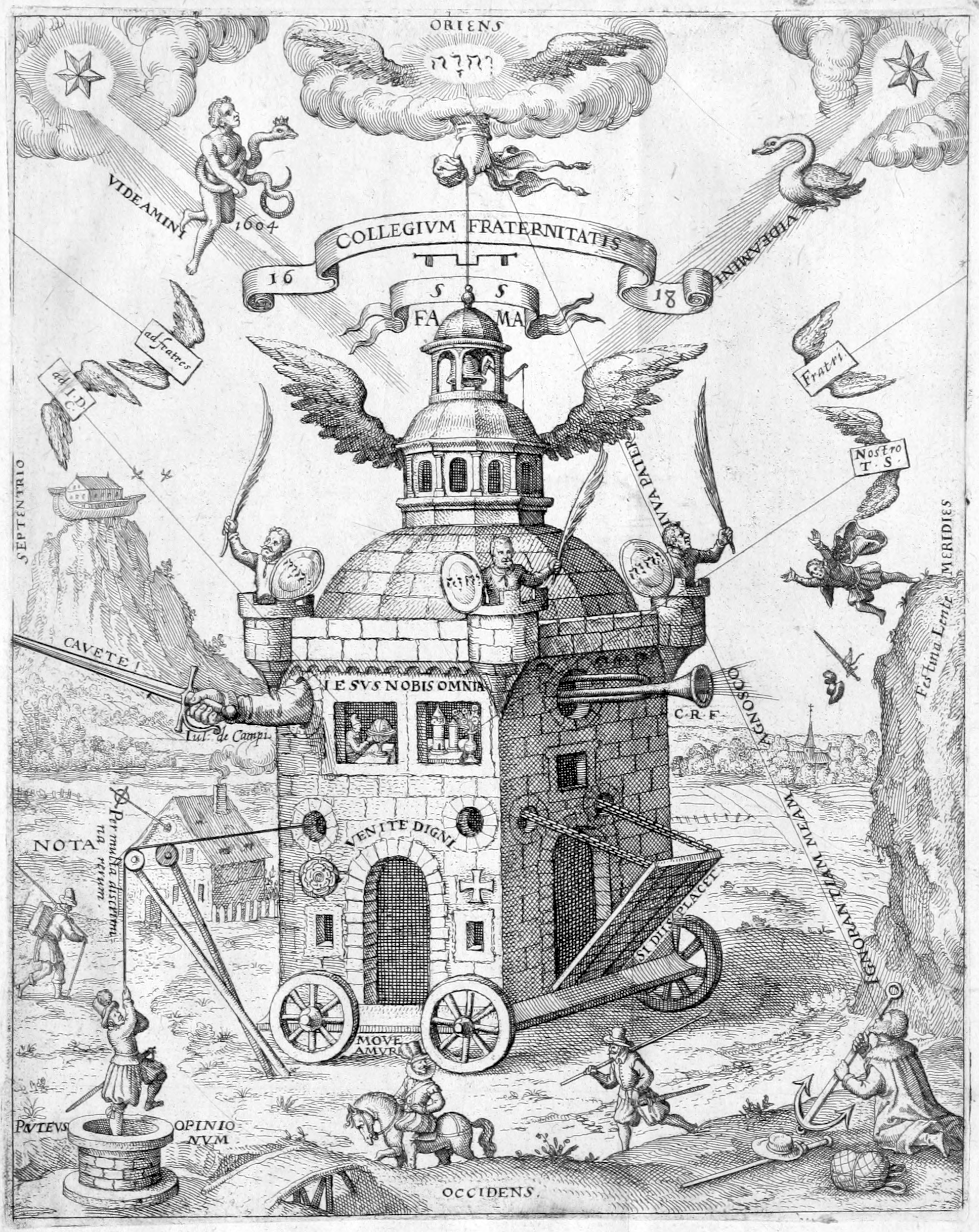
The 17th century English Invisible College

Collegium Invisibile is an academic society founded in 1995 in Warsaw that affiliates outstanding Polish students in the humanities and science with distinguished scholars in accordance with the idea of a liberal education. The association aims at offering young scholars the opportunity to participate in original research projects as well as exclusive individual master-student cooperation through the tutorial system based on methods used at the Oxbridge universities.

Collegium has its roots in the tradition of the eighteenth century Collegium Nobilium, an elite high school founded in 1740, one of the predecessors of the University of Warsaw. Traditionally, the rector of the university is ex officio chairman of the science board of the Collegium.

Each year about twenty Polish students who have succeeded in passing a stringent admission procedure are granted membership of Collegium and thus receive an opportunity to follow an individually chosen path of academic study.

== Tutors ==
Students choose scholars with whom they would like to cooperate. The scholars are then invited to become fellows of the Collegium.

=== Fellows ===
- Jan Błoński
- Leszek Balcerowicz
- Bronisław Geremek
- Jerzy Jarniewicz
- Jacek Jastrzębski
- Ewa Łętowska
- Aleksander Gieysztor
- Hanna Gronkiewicz-Waltz
- Jerzy Jedlicki
- Jerzy Kłoczowski
- Monika Kostera
- Andrzej Koźmiński
- Ryszard Legutko
- Philippe Lejeune
- Andrzej Olechowski
- Zbigniew Pełczyński
- Wojciech Roszkowski
- Marek Safjan
- Marek Siemek
- Paweł Śpiewak
- Józef Tischner
- Ewa Wipszycka
