= Kozminski =

Kozminski may refer to:

- Koźmiński (surname)
- Kozminski University, a private, non profit business school in Warsaw, Poland
- United States v. Kozminski, a United States Supreme Court case involving the Thirteenth Amendment to the United States Constitution
- Cyclops Kozminskii, a crustacean in the genus Cyclops
- Powiat Koźmiński, Polish name of Kreis Koschmin, a county in the southern administrative district of Posen, in the Prussian province of Posen
