= Koźmin =

Koźmin may refer to the following places in Poland:

- Koźmin, Lower Silesian Voivodeship (south-west Poland)
- Koźmin, Szamotuły County in Greater Poland Voivodeship (west-central Poland)
- Koźmin, Turek County in Greater Poland Voivodeship (west-central Poland)
- Koźmin, Pomeranian Voivodeship (north Poland)
- Koźmin Wielkopolski was known as Koźmin until 1996

== See also ==
- Maksymilian Koźmin, Polish footballer
- Vitali Kozmin, Estonian dancer and choreographer
- Kozminski
