= Paweł Śpiewak =

Polish sociologist (1951–2023)

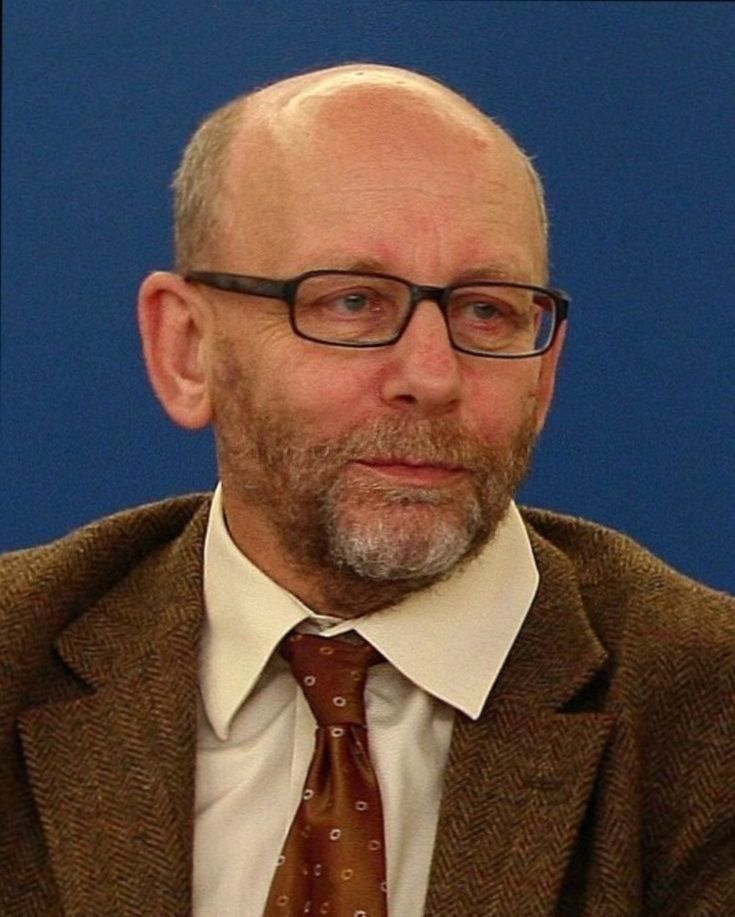

Member of Sejm 2005–2007
- In office 25 September 2005 – 2007

Personal details
- Born: 17 April 1951 Warsaw, Poland
- Died: 30 March 2023 (aged 71)
- Party: Civic Platform

Paweł Śpiewak [ˈpavɛw ˈɕpʲɛvak] (17 April 1951 – 30 March 2023) was a Polish sociologist, historian, author and politician. He was the Director of the Jewish Historical Institute in Warsaw.

== Biography ==
Paweł Śpiewak was a Professor of Sociology at Warsaw University. He was elected to the Sejm on 25 September 2005 getting 18,403 votes in 19 Warsaw district, running as a candidate with the Civic Platform list. He did not seek reelection in 2007.

Śpiewak was a Fellow of Collegium Invisibile.

In 2011, he was nominated as the Director of the Jewish Historical Institute by Bogdan Zdrojewski, Minister of Culture and National Heritage.

Śpiewak was the son of nationally renowned writers Anna Kamieńska (1920–1986) and Jan Śpiewak (1908–1967).

Śpiewak died on 30 March 2023, at the age of 71.

== See also ==
- Members of Polish Sejm 2005–2007
