= Common Knowledge? =

2014 book by Dariusz Jemielniak

Common Knowledge? An Ethnography of Wikipedia
- Author: Dariusz Jemielniak
- Subject: Wikipedia
- Publisher: Stanford University Press
- Publication date: 2014
- Publication place: United States
- Pages: 312
- ISBN: 978-0804789448

Common Knowledge? An Ethnography of Wikipedia is a 2014 book about Wikipedia's community of contributors. The author is Dariusz Jemielniak, who is a Wikipedia contributor himself.

== Reviews ==
The book was well received by critics and other scholars.

A reviewer for Vice called the book "both primer and detailed study on the habits of Wikipedians".

A writer for Inside Higher Ed said that the "book offers a management expert's inside view of how it has tried, for better or worse, to arrive at a self-sustaining and novel form of self-management".

In Pacific Standard, the reviewer said the book was "a detailed ethnographic study of a paradoxical culture that is at once egalitarian and hierarchical, rule bound and consensus driven, collaborative and conflict driven".

George Anders gave summaries of concepts covered, including Wikipedia's rule sets, tension between experienced and inexperienced contributors, conflicts between subject matter experts and fact checkers, and the implications of Wikipedia having a large audience.

An academic reviewer for European Management Review stated their recognition that the book's author had a unique insight into the workings of the Wikimedia community. They commented that the book had a bias for English and Polish language Wikipedia communities due to the author's participation in those communities. They recommended the book as a way to understand Wikipedia, for insights into online communities, or even for learning about aspects of online communities by reading particular chapters without reading the entire book.

== See also ==
- Bibliography of Wikipedia
- For information on the administrative structure of Wikipedia, see Wikipedia:Administration
