= Collaborative society =

Collaborative society is a view of human society defined as encompassing the emerging phenomena of citizen science, collaborative media, digital communication, gift economy, peer production, remix culture, and the sharing economy. This system relies on a variety of resource distribution methods within the economy, which in turn influence consumption patterns, all of which are grounded in the fundamental principles of sharing and collaboration. Dariusz Jemielniak and Aleksandra Przegalińska have defined it as "a series of services... that enable peer-to-peer exchanges and interactions through technology" as well as "an increasingly recurring phenomenon of emergent and enduring cooperative groups, whose members have developed particular patterns of relationships through technology-mediated cooperation"

== See also ==
- Collaborative consumption
