= Journal of Management and Business Administration. Central Europe =

Polish peer-reviewed publication

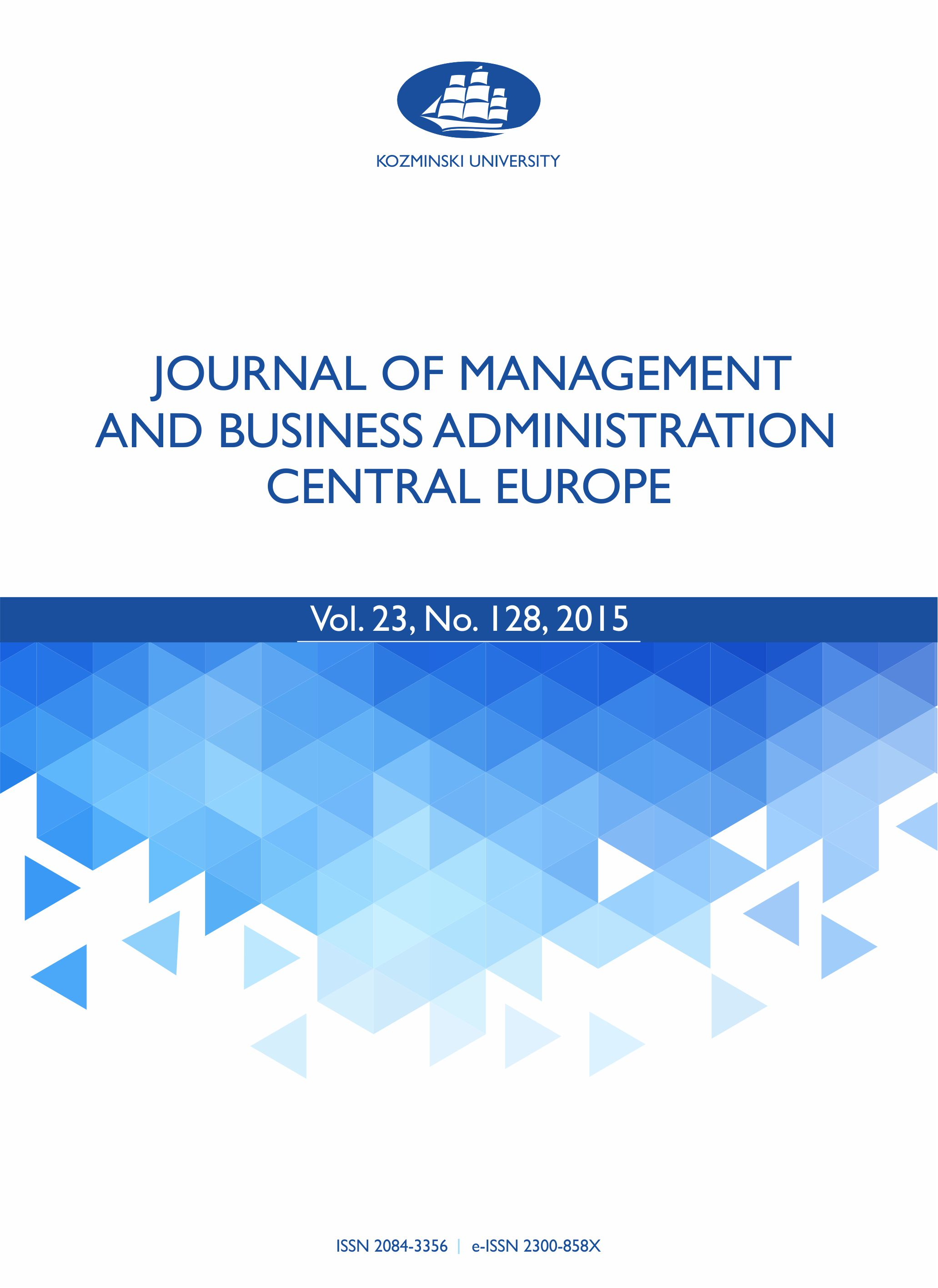
- Discipline: Management
- Language: Polish, English
- Edited by: Paweł Korzyński

Publication details
- Former name: Master of Business Administration. Central Europe
- History: 1993-present
- Publisher: Kozminski University (Poland)
- Frequency: Quarterly

Standard abbreviations
- ISO 4: J. Manag. Bus. Adm. Cent. Eur.

Indexing
- ISSN: 2084-3356
- OCLC no.: 804717214

Links
- Journal homepage; [h ]

The Journal of Management and Business Administration. Central Europe is a quarterly peer-reviewed academic journal published by Kozminski University. It covers all aspects of management studies and publishes both empirical and theoretical research articles in Polish and English. It was established in 1993 as Master of Business Administration and obtained its current title in 2011. The current editor-in-chief is Paweł Korzyński (Kozminski University).

== Abstracting and indexing ==
Journal of Management and Business Administration. Central Europe is abstracted and indexed in the Central and Eastern European Online Library and Proquest IBSS.
