= Grzegorz Mazurek =

Polish researcher and rector of Kozminski University

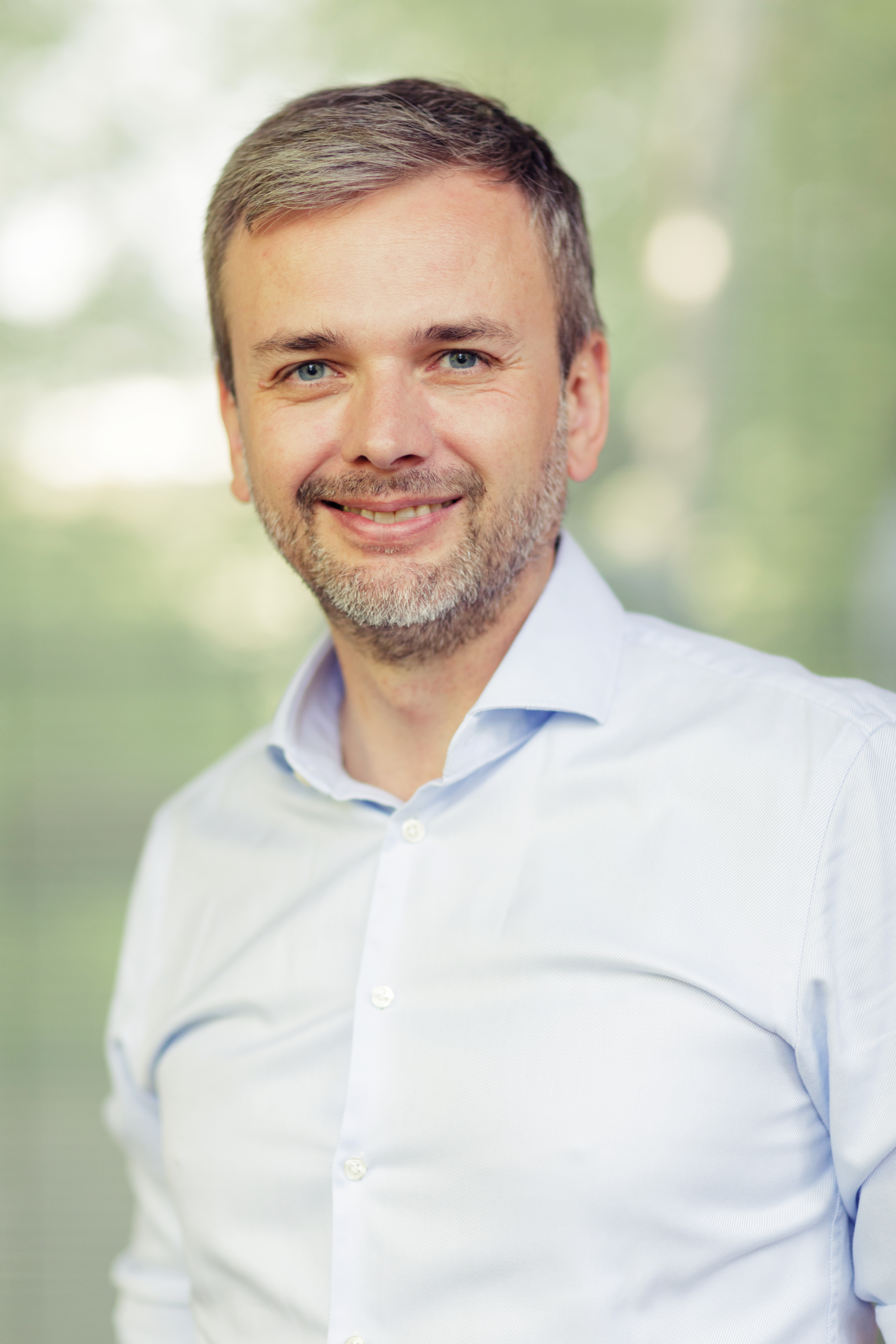
- Grzegorz Mazurek
- Born: 27 December 1976 (age 49); Przemyśl, Poland
- Scientific career
- Fields: Management, Marketing
- Workplaces: Kozminski University
- Website: Google Scholar

Grzegorz Mazurek (born December 27, 1976, in Przemyśl) is a Polish professor, academic manager, and expert in Digital transformation and Management. He serves as Rector of Kozminski University since 2020. He joined European Foundation for Management Development (EFMD) Board of Trustees in 2024 and was elected Vice-President of EFMD for Central and Eastern Europe in 2025. In 2026, he was appointed to the Superviosry Board of PKO Bank Polski.

== Career ==
From 2012 to 2020 Mazurek was Vice-Rector for International Cooperation at Kozminski University in Warsaw, Poland. During his tenure, Kozminski University was recognized as the most internationalized university in Poland. In 2020, he was appointed Rector of Kozminski University for the term 2020-2024 and was reappointed for the term 2024-2028. Mazurek is also Director of Center for Research on Digital Transformation of Economy and Society (CYBERMAN) at Kozminski University.

He has completed research stays at institutions including IESE Business School and Tilburg University. He has been a Visiting Professor at ESCP Business School, Skema Business School, École de management de Normandie, Nottingham Trent University, Soongsil University, Universidad del Pacífico, Reykjavík University, and ISC Paris.

Between 2016 and 2018, Mazurek was a member of the Council for Digitization under the Ministry of Digital Affairs.

In 2018 he became a member of the EFMD Advisory Board for the Central and Eastern European region and the EQUIS Accreditation Board.

In 2023, he was appointed as a representative of CRASP to the European University Association (EUA) Expert Group on Innovation. In 2024, he became a member of the Supervisory Board of the Our Future Foundation. He joined EFMD Board of Trustees in 2024 and was elected Vice-President of EFMD for Central and Eastern Europe in 2025. In 2026, he was appointed to the Superviosry Board of PKO Bank Polski.

== Research and teaching ==
Mazurek's academic work focuses on digital transformation, particularly the impact of digital technologies on organizational management, e-marketing, e-business, and digital education.

He is the author of the book "Digital Transformation: A Marketing Perspective" and the editor and co-author of the textbook "E-marketing – Planning, Tools and Practice".

Mazurek is the creator of two master’s degree programs: Management in a Virtual Environment and Master in Management – Digital Marketing at Kozminski University. He also serves as academic coordinator for postgraduate programs in areas such as internet marketing, e-commerce, and digital business transformation.

== Awards ==
In 2017, he was awarded the EDUinspirator statuette for contributions in the field of education. In 2020, he received the Star of Internationalization award in the Research category by the "Perspectives" foundation. In 2025, he received the "Ad Rem" Educational Award.

== Selected publications ==
1. Kaczorowska-Spychalska, D., Kotula, N., Mazurek, G., & Sułkowski, Łukasz. (2024). Generative AI as source of change of knowledge management paradigm. Human Technology, 20(1), 131–154. DOI: 10.14254/1795-6889.2024.20-1.7
2. Doanh, D. C., Dufek, Z., Ejdys, J., Ginevičius, R., Korzyński, P., Mazurek, G., Paliszkiewicz, J., Wach, K., & Ziemba, E. (2023). Generative AI in the manufacturing process: theoretical considerations. Engineering Management in Production and Services, 15(4), 76-89. doi:10.2478/emj-2023-0029.
3. Korzynski, P., Mazurek, G., Krzypkowska, P., & Kurasinski, A. (2023). Artificial intelligence prompt engineering as a new digital competence: Analysis of generative AI technologies such as ChatGPT. Entrepreneurial Business and Economics Review, 11(3), 25–37. doi:10.15678/EBER.2023.110302.
4. Wach, K., Duong, C. D., Ejdys, J., Kazlauskaitė, R., Korzynski, P., Mazurek, G., Paliszkiewicz, J., Ziemba, E. (2023). The dark side of generative artificial intelligence: A critical analysis of controversies and risks of ChatGPT. Entrepreneurial Business and Economics Review, 11(2), 7–30. doi:10.15678/EBER.2023.110201.
5. Korzynski, P., Mazurek, G., Altmann, A., Ejdys, J., Kazlauskaite, R., Paliszkiewicz, J., Wach, K., and Ziemba, E. (2023). Generative artificial intelligence as a new context for management theories: analysis of ChatGPT. Central European Management Journal. 31. 10.1108/CEMJ-02-2023-0091.
6. Mazurek, G., Małagocka, K. (2022). Personalisation of Higher Education: From Prospects to Alumni. In A. Kaplan (Ed.), "Digital Transformation and Disruption of Higher Education" (pp. 289–300). Cambridge: Cambridge University Press. doi:10.1017/9781108979146.028.
7. Mazurek, G., Gorska, A., Korzynski, P., and Silva, S. (2022), "Social Networking Sites and Researcher’s Success", Journal of Computer Information Systems, 62:2, 259–266, doi:10.1080/08874417.2020.1783724.
8. Korzynski P., Mazurek G., and Haenlein M. (2020), "Leveraging employees as spokespeople in your HR strategy: How company-related employee posts on social media can help firms attract new talent", European Management Journal, Volume 38, Issue 1, doi:10.1016/j.emj.2019.08.003.
9. Mazurek G., Małagocka K. (2019), "What if you ask and they say yes? Consumers' willingness to disclose personal data is stronger than you think, Business Horizons, vol. 62, issue 6, doi:10.1016/j.bushor.2019.07.008.
10. Przegalinska-Skierkowska A., Ciechanowski L., Stroz A., Gloor P., Mazurek G. (2019), In bot we trust: A new methodology of chatbot performance measures, Business Horizons, vol. 62, issue 6, doi:10.1016/j.bushor.2019.08.005.
