= Anna Kamieńska =

Polish poet, writer, translator and literary critic

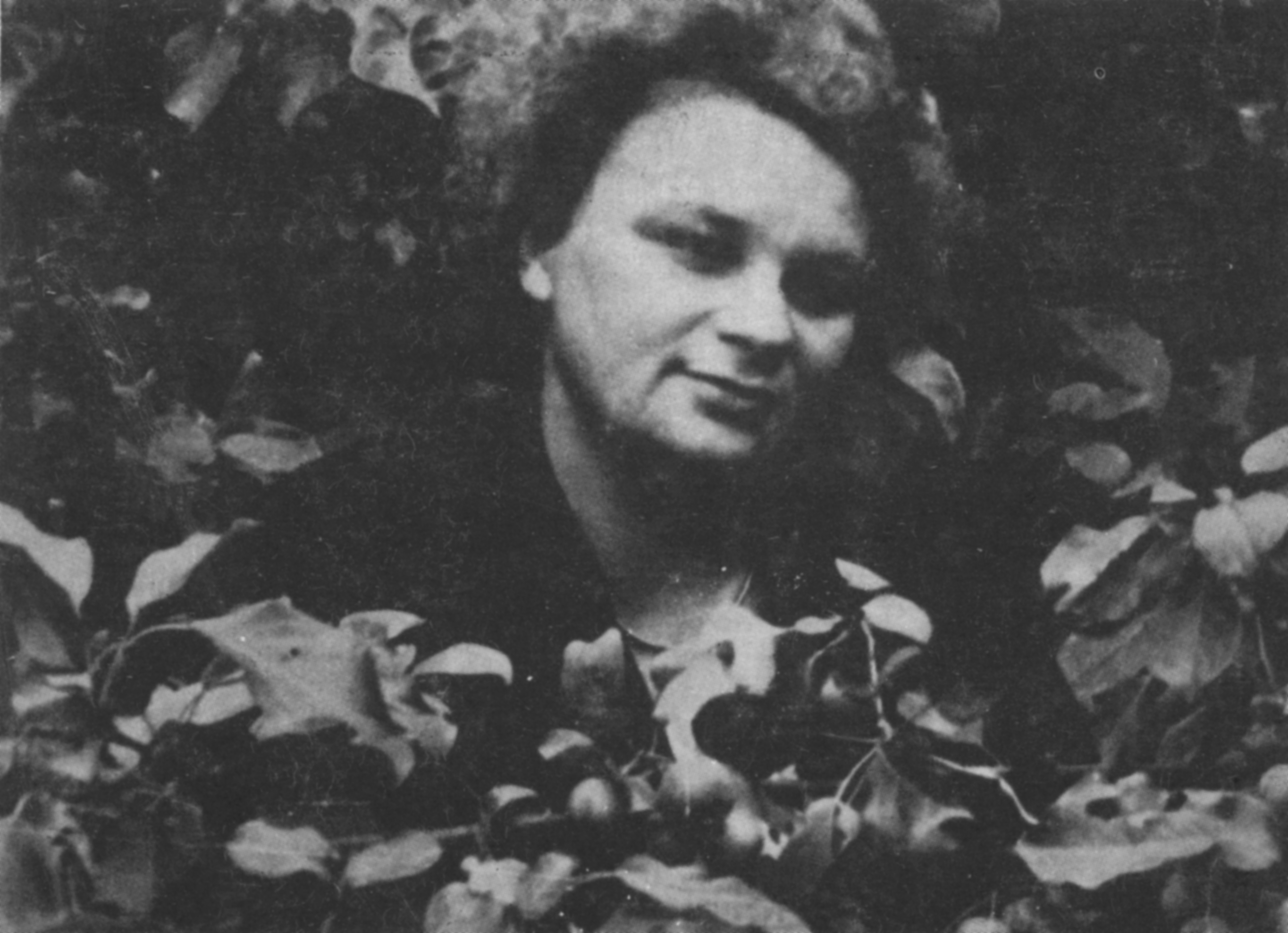
- Portrait of Kamieńska from one of her publications, c.1980
- Born: April 12, 1920; Krasnystaw, Lublin Voivodeship, Second Polish Republic
- Died: May 10, 1986 (aged 66); Warsaw, Warsaw Voivodeship, Polish People's Republic
- Education: University of Łódź
- Parents: Tadeusz Kamiensk (father); Maria Romana née Cękalska (mother)

Anna Kamieńska (12 April 1920 – 10 May 1986) was a Polish poet, writer, translator and literary critic. She wrote many books for children and adolescents.

== Life ==
Kamieńska was born on 12 April 1920 in Krasnystaw. Her parents were Tadeusz Kamienski and Maria née Cękalska. Her early years were spent in Lublin. She frequently stayed with her grandparents in Świdnik.

Her father died early, so the burden of bringing up four daughters fell on her mother. Anna's first poetry was composed when she was about 14 (1936), published in "Płomyczek" under the auspices of Joseph Czechowicz. From 1937, she studied at the Pedagogical School in Warsaw. During the Nazi occupation, she lived in Lublin, and taught in underground village schools. After graduating from college in Lublin, she studied classical philology – initially at the Catholic University of Lublin, and then at the University of Łódź.

Kamienska was affiliated with the cultural weekly Country, where she was an editor from 1946 to 1953, and the weekly New Culture (poetry editor, 1950–1963), and a monthly Work (from 1968). In the mid-1950s, she began to write songs for youth.

In 1948, she married poet and translator Jan Śpiewak. Together they had two sons: Jan Leon (1949–1988 – a journalist, publicist, writer, social activist) and Paweł (born in 1951, professor of sociology at the University of Warsaw, and member of the Sejm, 2005–2007).

Anna and Jan worked together on translations of Russian poetry and drama, and edited numerous books. In 1967, Jan suddenly fell ill with cancer and died 22 December. In her grief, Kamieńska returned to the Roman Catholic Church, which deeply influenced her later works.

She died in Warsaw on 10 May 1986.

== Work ==
She wrote fifteen books of poetry, two volumes of "Notebooks", providing a shorthand record of her readings and self-questioning, three volumes of commentaries on the Bible, and translations from several Slavic languages as well as from Hebrew, Latin and French. Her poems record the struggles of a rational mind with religious faith, addressing loneliness and uncertainty in a direct, unsentimental manner. While exploring the meaning of love and grief, and the yearning for love, Kamienska's poetry still expresses a quiet humor and a pervasive sense of gratitude for human existence and for a myriad of creatures.

Kamienska's poems also touch on Judaism, and the total loss of Jewish culture and the Yiddish language from Poland as a result of the Holocaust.

=== In translation ===
- Astonishments: Selected Poems of Anna Kamieńska, edited and translated by Grażyna Drabik and David Curzon, Paraclete Press, 2007. ISBN 978-1-55725-528-0
- I Sought a Dead Man and Found God: The Notebooks of Anna Kamieńska, edited and translated by Clare Cavanagh. Yale University Press, 2027. ISBN 9780300247206
- In That Great River: A Notebook Prose from Poetry Magazine https://www.poetryfoundation.org/poetrymagazine/articles/69535/in-that-great-river-a-notebook
- "Two Darknesses" Selected & Translated by Tomasz P Krzeszowski & Desmond Graham Flambard Press, 1994, (ISBN 1 873226 08 X)
- A Book of Luminous Things: An International Anthology of Poetry, edited and translated by Czeslaw Milosz, Hartcourt Publishing Company, 1996. ISBN 978-0-15-600574-6
