= Leon Koźmiński =

Polish economist (1904–1993)

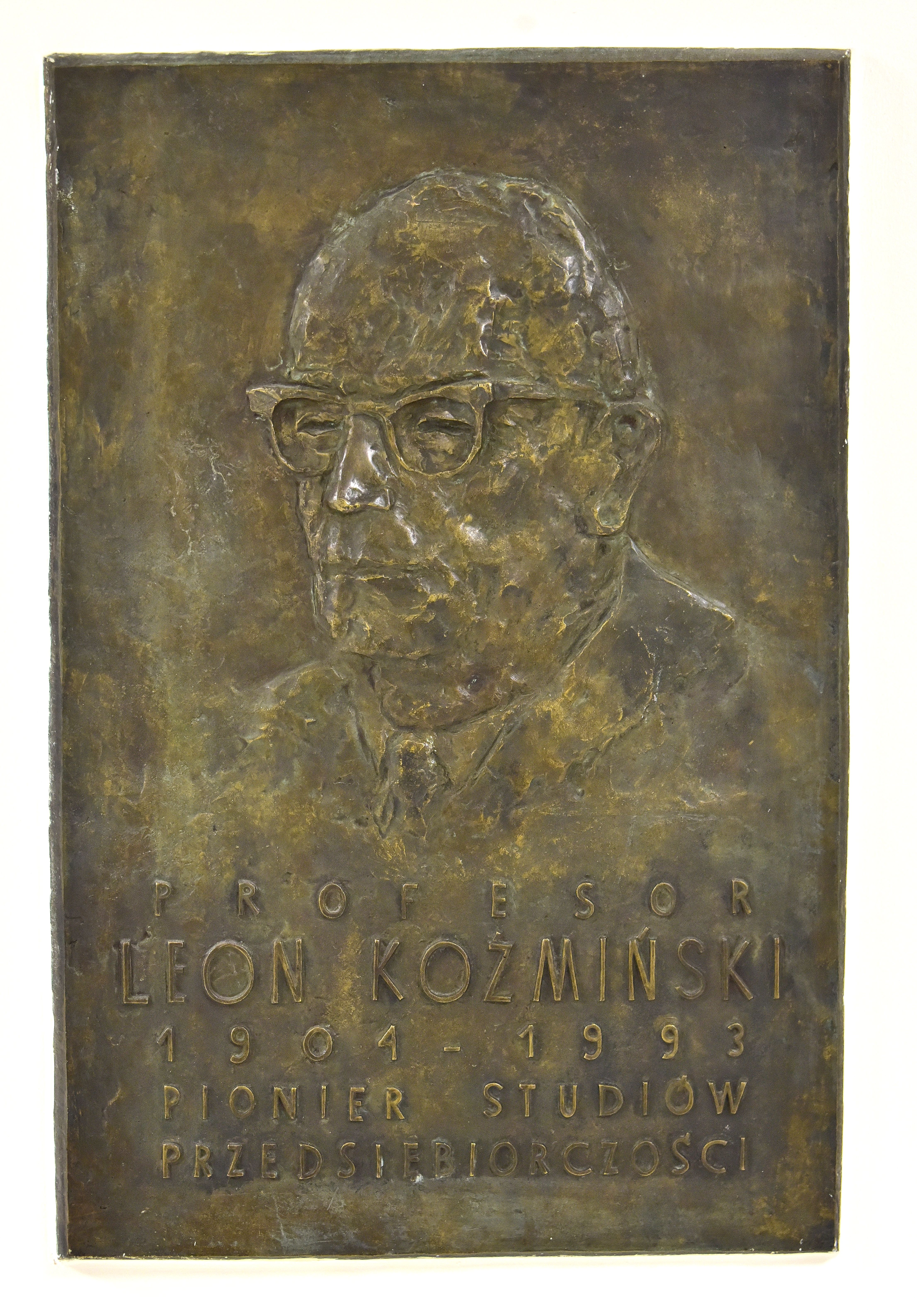
- Koźmiński commemorative plaque
- Born: October 1, 1904; Daszkowce (present-day Ukraine)
- Died: June 16, 1993 (aged 88); Warsaw, Poland
- Education: SGH Warsaw School of Economics
- Occupations: economist, academic teacher

Leon Koźmiński (Polish pronunciation: [ˈlɛɔn kɔʑˈmiɲskʲi]; born 1 October 1904 – died 6 June 1993) was a Polish economist, academic, lieutenant of the Home Army, participant of the Warsaw Uprising and a professor at the SGH Warsaw School of Economics.

== Life and career ==
He was born in 1904 in Daszkowce in present-day Ukraine, Vinnytsia Oblast. He graduated from College Champite high school in Lausanne, Switzerland. In 1920, he returned to Poland and attended the State Humanities Gymnasium in Tczew. He also graduated from and subsequently worked throughout the rest of his scientific career at the SGH Warsaw School of Economics (Polish: Szkoła Główna Handlowa w Warszawie, SGH). In 1929, he received his doctorate from the University of Paris. He published over 150 scientific papers relating to business and trade including several coursebooks used at various economic schools.

== World War II ==
In 1939, he fought in the 21st infantry regiment as a lieutenant. In German-occupied Poland, he taught at Miejska Szkoła Handlowa (City Business School) which was an official name of the Warsaw School of Economics during the war as well as at the Naval Institute of the underground University of Western Lands. He was also active in the Polish resistance movement in World War II, acting in the “Z” unit of “the Western Lands” at the Government Delegation for Poland. As a lieutenant, he fought in the district of Mokotów in the Warsaw Uprising, as the commander of the “Baszta” Group of Home Army.

== Recognition ==
In 1997, he was named as the patron of the Warsaw Higher School of Management which has since been known as Kozminski University (in Poland known as Akademia Leona Koźmińskiego, ALK). The Financial Times named the university as the best business school in Poland and Central Europe. His son, Andrzej Koźmiński, later served as rector of the university.

== See also ==
- List of business schools in Europe
- Michał Kalecki
