= Monika Kostera =

Polish academic

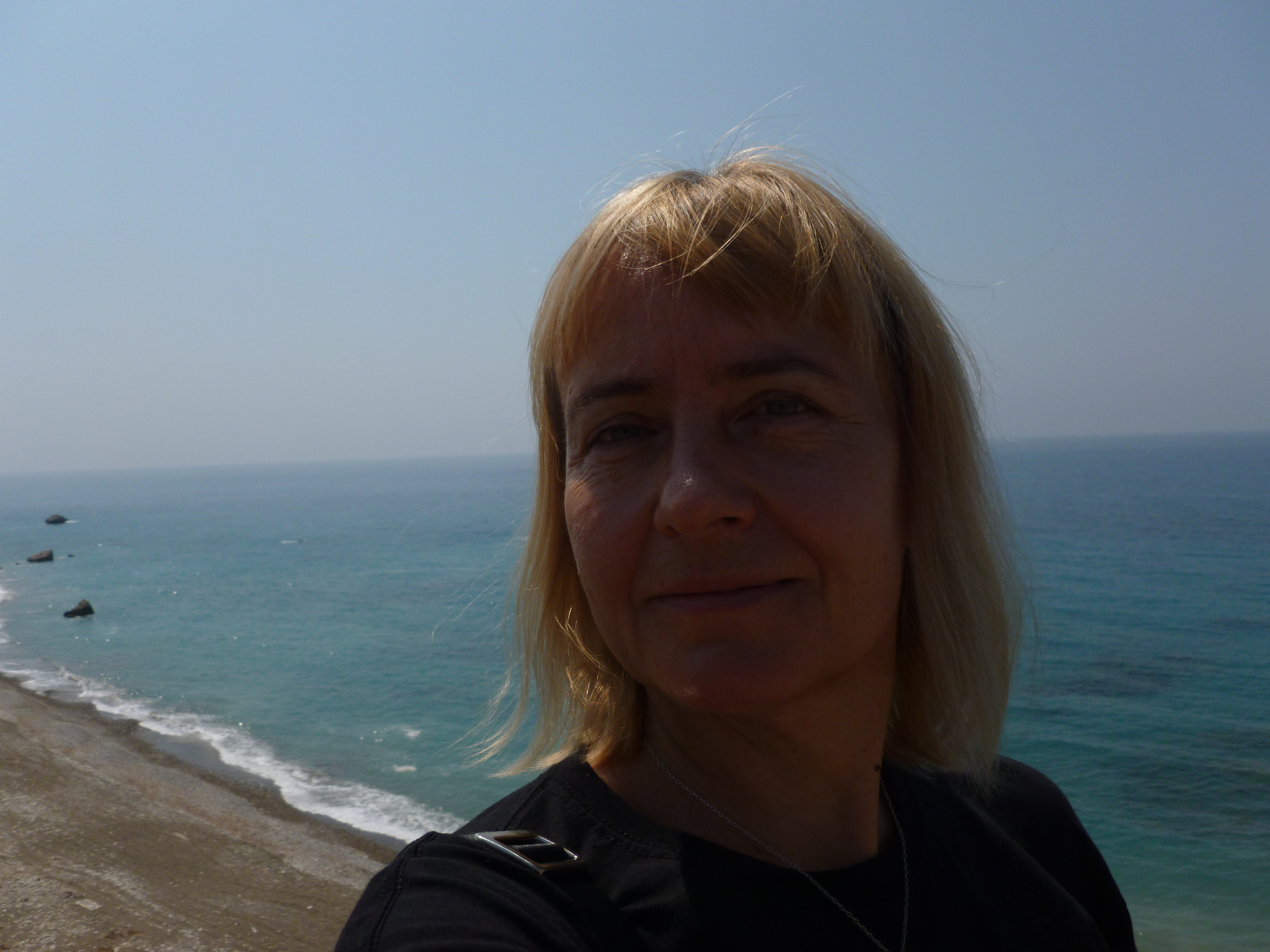
- Prof. Monika Kostera
- Born: Monika Maria Kostera; 28 February 1963 (age 63); Poland
- Citizenship: Polish
- Education: Lund University; University of Warsaw
- Scientific career
- Fields: Organizational Ethnography, Humanistic Management
- Workplaces: Jagiellonian University

Monika Maria Kostera (born 28 February 1963) is a Polish sociologist of management. She is known for her contribution to organization theory, organizational archetypes and myths, storytelling and narrative analysis in organizational anthropology. She holds professorships at University of Warsaw, Södertörn University in Sweden and Institut Mines-Télécom Business School in France.

== Education ==
Monika Kostera graduated from the Lund University, Sweden (1983) and Warsaw University, Poland (1988). She defended her doctoral dissertation at the faculty of Management, Warsaw University in 1990 and her habilitation in 1996.

== Career ==
In 1997, she became professor in management at Leon Koźmiński Academy in Warsaw, Poland. During 2000–2002, she acted as director of the Interdisciplinary Organization Research Center at Leon Koźmiński Academy.

In 2004, she received the title of Professor Ordinaria of Economics in Poland and, in 2017, Professor Ordinaria in the Humanities. She has been employed as professor and chair at Durham University in the United Kingdom, as well as professor at the Institute of Culture at Jagiellonian University in Poland and at Linnaeus University in Sweden.

=== Research ===
Kostera's past research considered organizational culture. She also has made the contribution to organizational changes in transitional economy theory^{,}and critical management studies. Her current work focuses on disalienation of work, imagination and organizing, organizational ethnography and humanistic management. In her research she applies an ethnographic approach. In some of her most recent publications – including the book together with Jerzy Kociatkiewicz, Irena Bauman and Zygmunt Bauman – she tackles the subject of management in social reality perceived through the lens of liquid modernity. In addition, her current work explores human dignity in organizations and utopian or dystopian future imaginaries of higher education and contemporary universities.

Monika Kostera has published 47 books, both in Polish and English, published by publishers such as Polity, Blackwell, Edward Elgar, and PWN. She has also published articles in such journals as Organization Studies, Journal of Organizational Behavior, Human Relations and British Journal of Management. She several seats on editorial boards of leading management and organization theory journals and has served as associate editor, among others, at European Management Review, Management Learning, British Journal of Management, and currently Gender, Work and Organization.

== Selected books ==
- Kostera, Monika. (2020) The imagined organization: spaces, dreams and places. Edward Elgar. Cheltenham. ISBN 978-1-78990-986-9
- Kostera, M., Izak, M., Zawadzki, M., (eds), (2017) The Future of University Education. London, Palgrave Macmillan, forthcoming.
- Kostera, M., Pirson, M., (eds), (2017) Dignity and the Organization. London: Palgrave Macmillan.
- Bauman, Z., Bauman, I., Kostera, M., Kociatkiewicz, J., (2015) Management in a Liquid Modern World. Polity Press.
- Kostera, M., Kociatkiewicz, J., (eds), (2014) Liquid organization: Zygmunt Bauman and organization theory. Oxford: Routledge.
- Kostera, M., (2014) Occupy Management! Inspirations and ideas for self-management and self-organization. Oxford: Routledge.
- Kostera, M., Höpfl, H., (eds), (2014) Interpreting the maternal organization. London-New York: Routledge, second edition.
- Kostera, M., (2012) Organizations and archetypes. Cheltenham: Edward Elgar.
- Kostera, M., (ed), (2008) Organizational Olympians: Heroes, heroines and villains of organizational myths. London: Palgrave.
- Kostera, M., (ed), (2008) Organizational Epics and Sagas: Tales of organizations. London: Palgrave.
- Kostera, M., (ed), (2008), Mythical inspirations for organizational realities. London: Palgrave
- Kostera, M., (2007) Organizational ethnography: Methods and inspirations. Lund: Studentlitteratur.
- Kostera, M., Hjorth, D., (eds), (2007) Entrepreneurship and the Experience Economy. Malmö: Copenhagen Business School Press.
- Kostera, M., (2005) The quest for the self-actualizing organization. Malmö: Liber.
- Kostera, M., Hatch, J. M., Kozminski, A., (eds), (2005) The three faces of leadership: Manager, artist, priest. Blackwell Publishing.
- Kostera, M., Kelemen, M., (eds) (2002) Critical management research in Eastern Europe: Managing the transition. Palgrave-Macmillan.

== See also ==
- University of Warsaw
- Organization Studies
- Gender, Work and Organization
