= Forsal.pl =

Polish financial news website

- Website type: Financial & business news
- Available in: Polish
- Owner: INFOR Biznes
- Editor: Daniel Rzasa
- Website: www.forsal.pl
- Commercial: Yes
- Launched: 2008
- Current status: Active

Forsal.pl is a Polish language web site covering financial and business news. It has a readership of approximately 500.000 unique visitors per month and has roughly 3 million page views per month.

Forsal.pl is a part of INFOR Biznes sp. z o.o. The web site cooperates closely with business news & legal weekday newspaper Dziennik Gazeta Prawna, which is also one of INFOR Biznes's proprietaries.

INFOR Biznes is owned in 51% by the Polish publishing company INFOR PL and in 49% by Ringier Axel Springer Media AG, which is a joint venture between the Swiss publishing company Ringier and the German publishing company Axel Springer.

== Coverage ==
Articles published by Forsal.pl were quoted by various newspapers and media outlets, including The Economist's blog 'Eastern Approaches', Spiegel Online, Bloomberg, ITAR-TASS, Gazeta Wyborcza and the Polish edition of Forbes magazine.

== Recognition ==
Forsal.pl has been ranked among the 10 most influential business news media outlets in Poland by the Institute of Media Monitoring, both in 2011, and 2012. It was also voted one of the most important investment news sources by members of the Polish Association of Individual Investors in 2012.
