= Koźmin, Lower Silesian Voivodeship =

Village in Lower Silesian Voivodeship, Poland

Koźmin
- Village
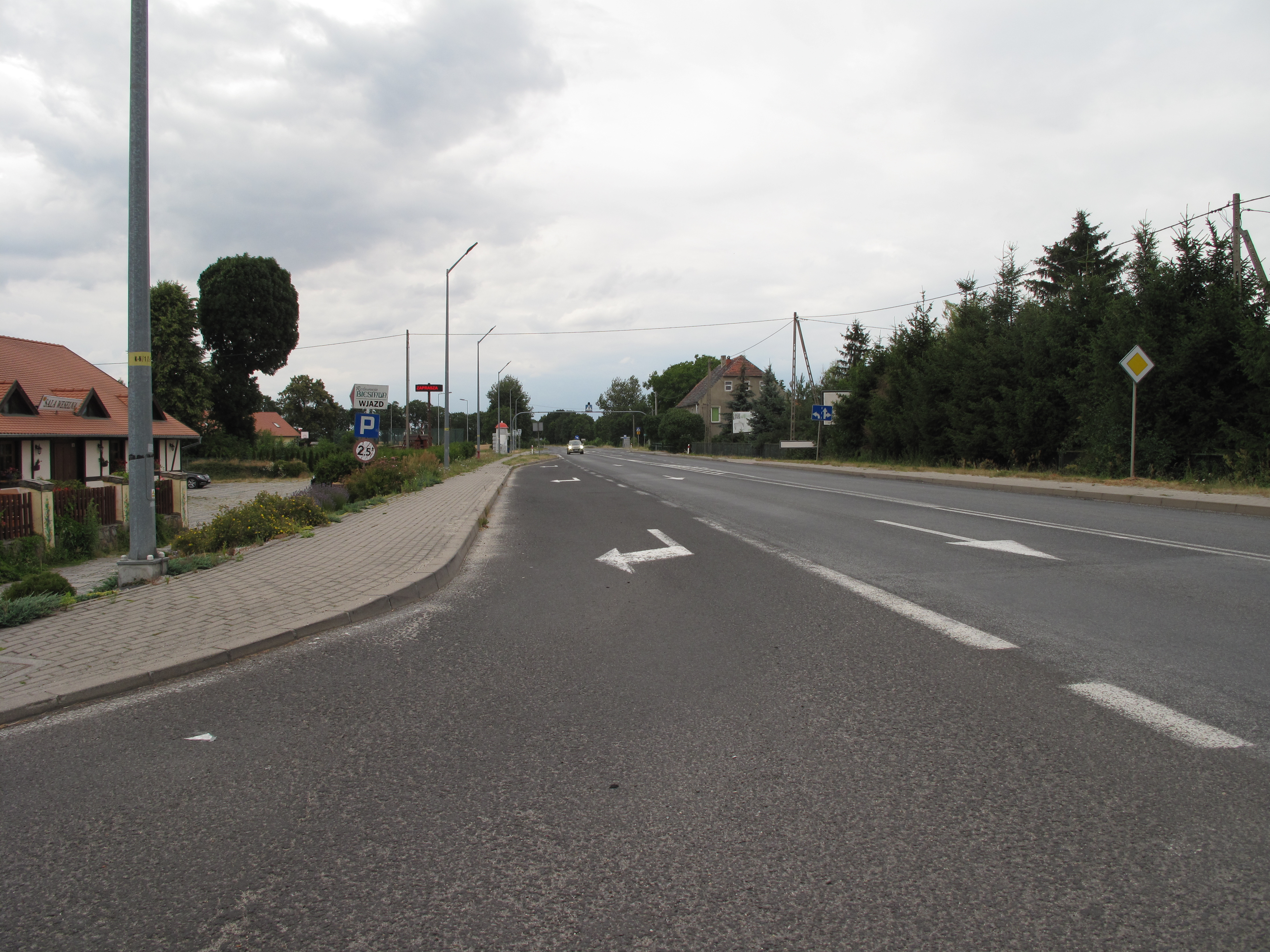
- Main road through the village

- Location within Poland
- Coordinates: 51°06′N 15°01′E
- Country: Poland
- Voivodeship: Lower Silesian
- County: Zgorzelec
- Gmina: Zgorzelec

Population
  - Total: 182
- Time zone: UTC+1 (CET)
  - Summer (DST): UTC+2 (CEST)
- Vehicle registration: DZG

Koźmin [ˈkɔʑmin] (German: Kosma) is a village in the administrative district of Gmina Zgorzelec, within Zgorzelec County, Lower Silesian Voivodeship, in south-western Poland, close to the German border.

In 2009 the village had a population of 182.

== Etymology ==
The name is of Slavic origin, and comes either from word kosma ("hair"), kosmaty ("shaggy"), kosm ("fur") or from the male name Kosma (Cosmas).

== Gallery ==
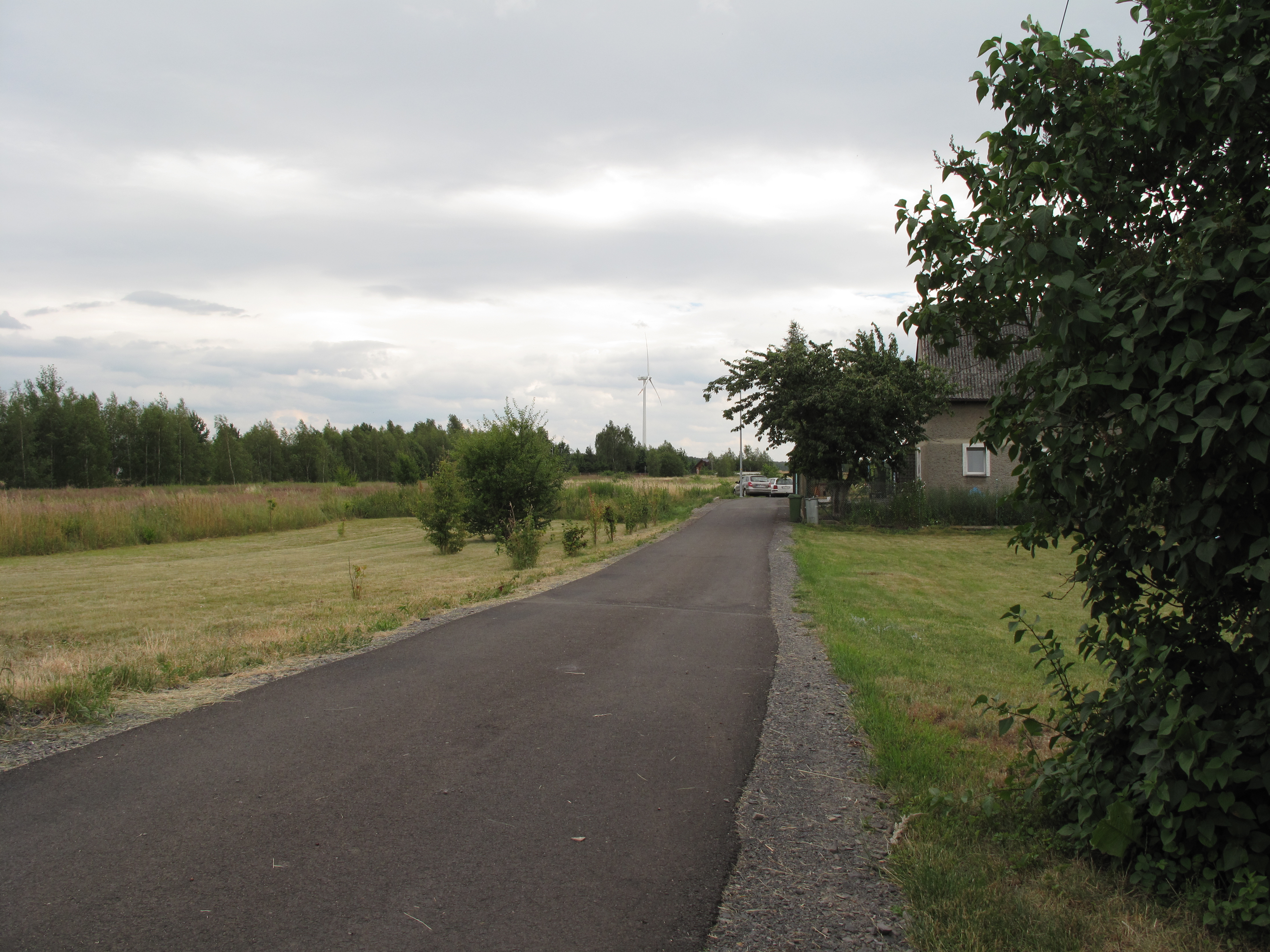
Side road

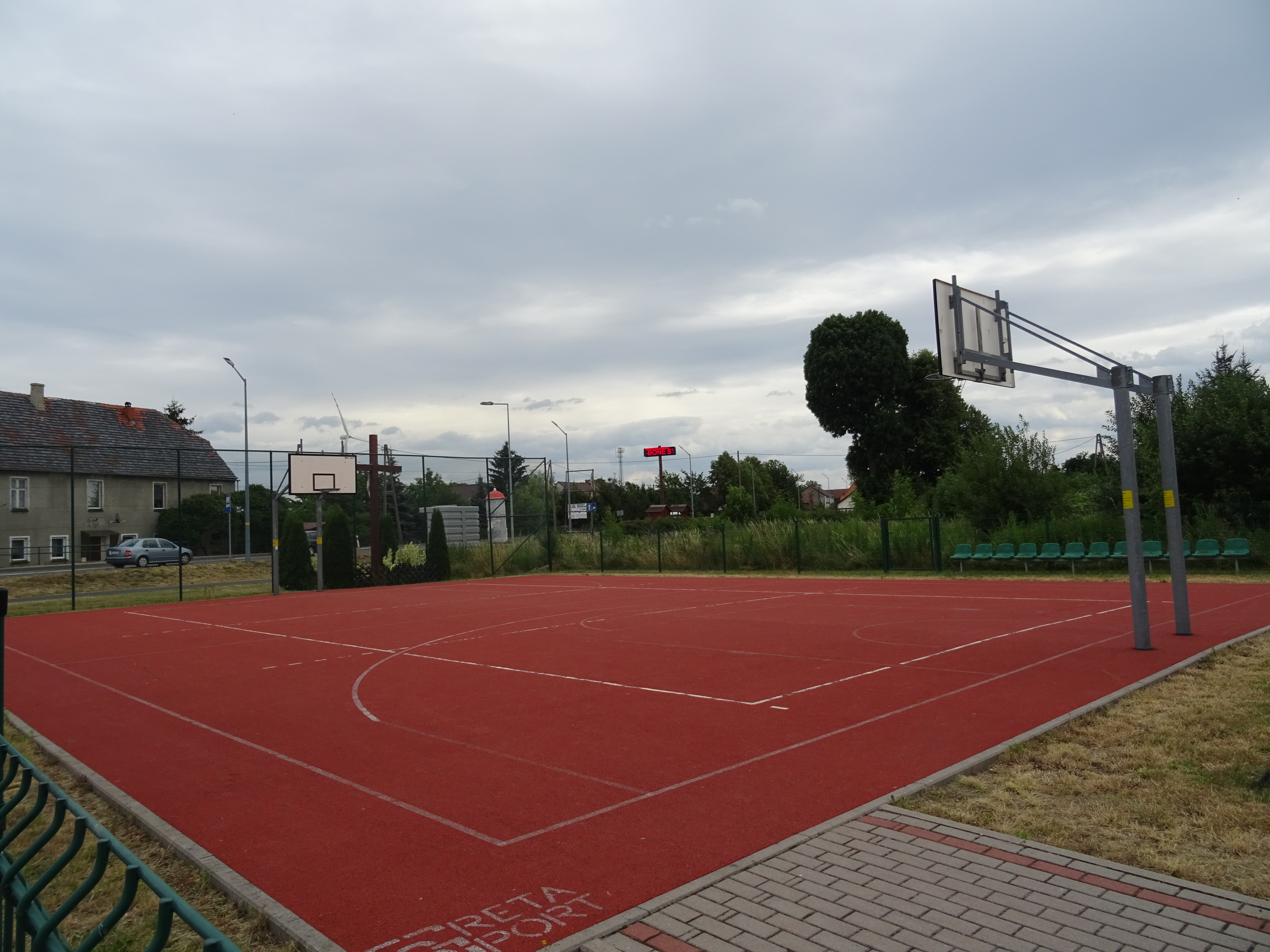
Basketball court

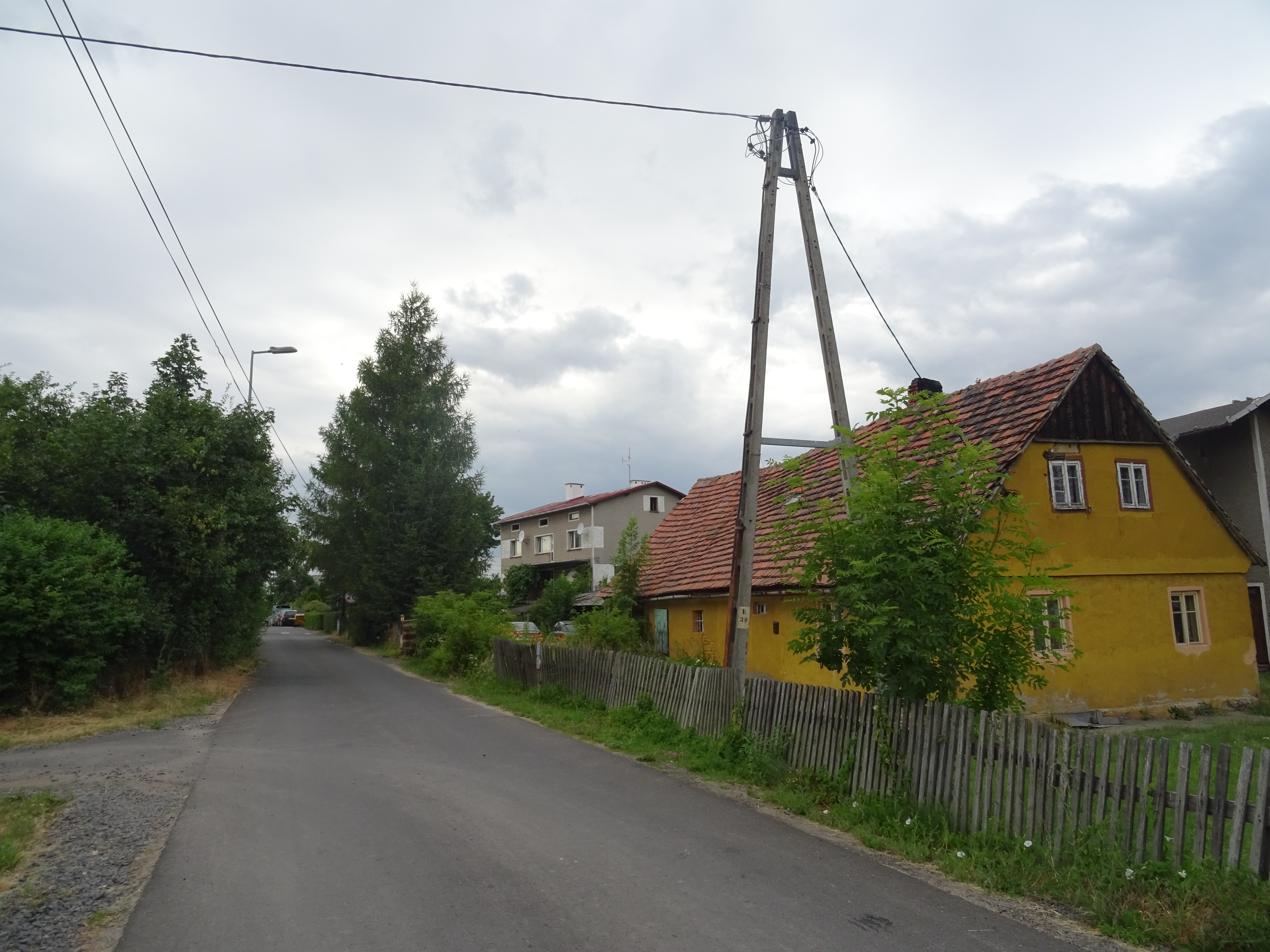
Houses by the road
