= Andrzej Koźmiński =

Polish economist

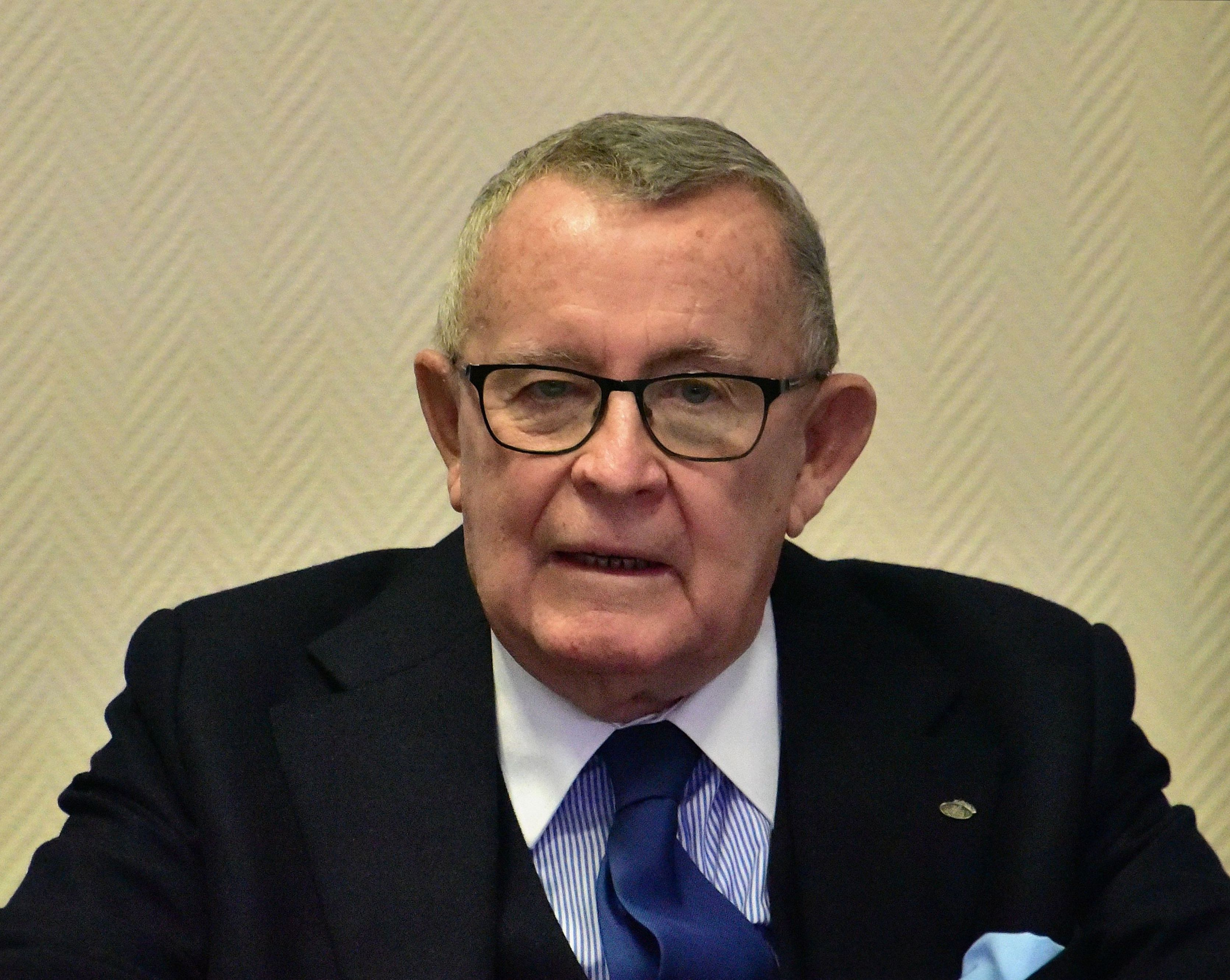
Andrzej K. Koźmiński (2019)

Andrzej Krzysztof Koźmiński (born 1 April 1941 in Warsaw, Poland) is a professor of management, the founder of Kozminski University (named after his late father, Leon Koźmiński), 1993–2011 the rector of this school, and currently its president.

He currently is one of two Polish Academy of Sciences members in management science.

He was a Fulbright scholar at Carnegie Mellon University in 1971, as well as a visiting professor at Washington University in St. Louis (1978–1979), Central Connecticut State University (1986–1989), University of California, Los Angeles (1990–1996), and other schools. Since 2006 he has served on the advisory board of École supérieure de commerce de Rouen as conseil d‘Administration.

Before starting up Kozminski University, he held a professorship at University of Warsaw, joint at the Department of Sociology and the Department of Management (which he headed 1981–1987). He served on the managing board of European Foundation for Management Development 1995–2001. He was a member of the Prime Minister’s Board for Socio-economic Strategies committee 1995–2006.

== Selected works ==
- A. K. Козьминьски, В. П. Буянов, Д. Емельняк, A. A. Хачатуров (2010), Основы управления. Учебник для высших учебных заведений Moskwa: Московская Акаденмия Экономики и Права
- Mary Jo Hatch, Monika Kostera, Andrzej K. Koźmiński (2005) The Three Faces of Leadership: Manager, Artist, Priest Blackwell Publishing Oxford
- Andrzej K. Koźmiński, George S. Yip (ed.) (2000) Strategies for Central and Eastern Europe, MacMillan Business London, St. Martin‘s Press New York.
- Krzysztof Obłój, Donald P. Cushman, Andrzej K. Koźmiński (1995) Winning. Continuous Improvement in High Performance Organizations, SUNY Press Albany
- Andrzej K. Koźmiński (1993) Catching Up? Case Studies of Organizational and Management Change in the Ex-Socialist Block, SUNY Press, Albany
- Andrzej K. Kozminski, Donald P. Cushman (ed.) (1993) Organizational Communication and Management. A Global Perspective, SUNY Press, Albany
