= Koźmiński University =

Private University in Warsaw, Poland

Coordinates: 52°16′17″N 21°00′54″E

- Akademia Leona Koźmińskiego
- Type: Private Business school
- Established: 1993
- Academic affiliations: EUA; European Law Faculties Association; The Global Compact; PRME; AIDA; IALS; Triple accreditation
- Rector: prof. dr hab. Grzegorz Mazurek
- Administrative staff: 797
- Students: 7,532 (12.2023)
- Location: 57/59 Jagiellońska St., 03-596, Warsaw, Poland
- Campus: Urban, 3.4 ha (8.4 acres)
- Website: www.kozminski.edu.pl/en

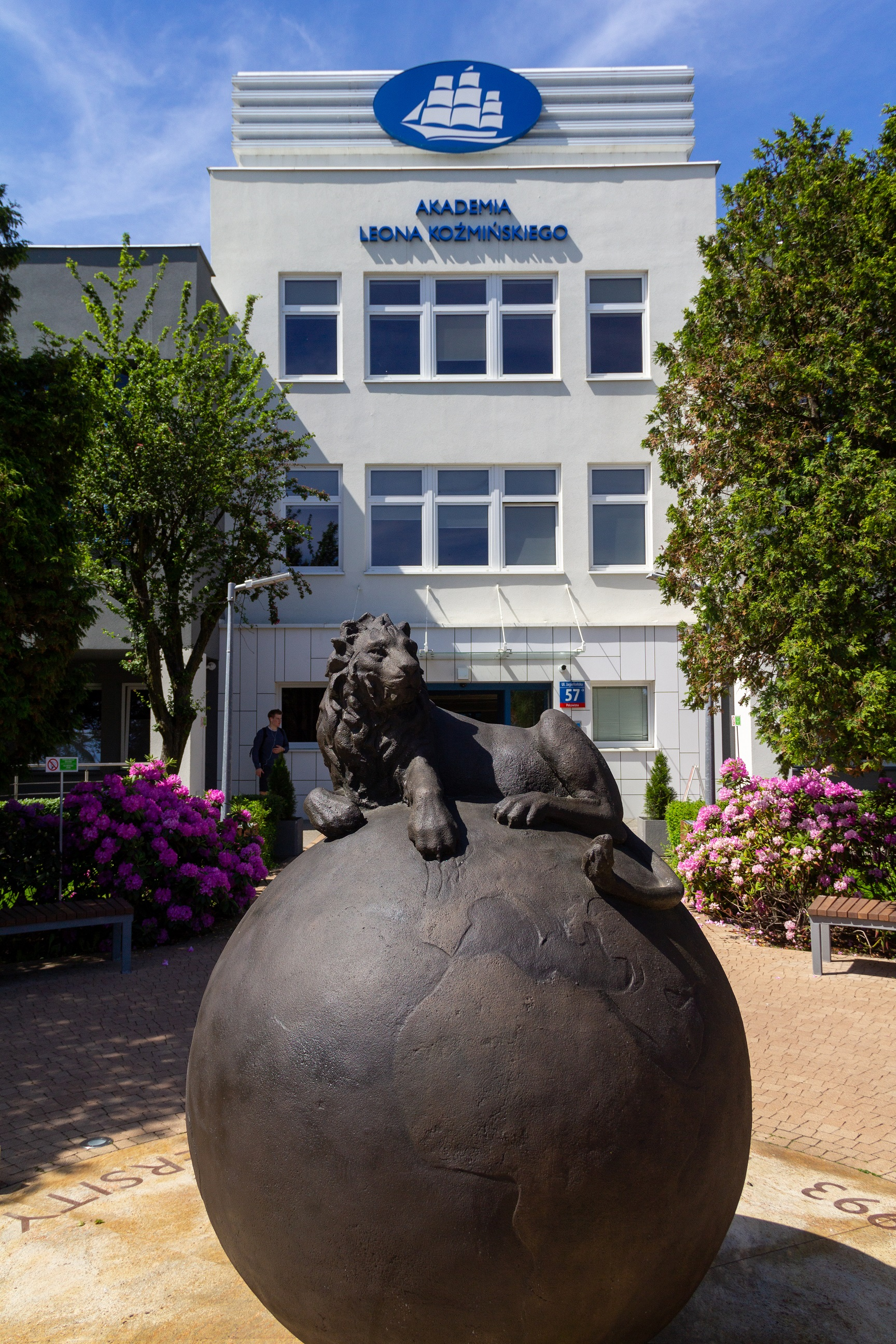
Part of Kozminski University campus

Koźmiński University (formerly known as Leon Koźmiński Academy of Entrepreneurship and Management; in Polish, Akademia Leona Koźmińskiego) is a private, nonprofit business school in Warsaw, Poland. It was established in 1993 and named after Leon Koźmiński, a Polish professor of economics and entrepreneurship, and also the father of Andrzej Koźmiński, the founder and the first rector of the school. It contains the Central Eastern campus of ESCP as of 2015, and the only institution of higher education in Poland, holding the "triple accreditation (EQUIS, AMBA, AACSB)". Less than 1% of business education providers worldwide hold these three major international quality accreditations.

Kozminski University has obtained the right to confer the degree of doctor in five areas: management, economics, law, finance and sociology, as well as the right to confer the degree of habilitated doctor in the areas of management, economics and law. The university has a distinction of the Polish Accreditation Commission for four faculties: management, finance and accounting, law and administration.

There are over 8000 students at Kozminski University. It offers bachelor's and master's degrees, a doctoral school, as well as post-graduate studies, including MBA programmes, in Polish and English. It also offers training and courses, and development programmes for companies. The university is fully prepared to conduct classes also in the remote mode.

== History ==
- March 1993 - Minister of Education entered the School of Entrepreneurship and Management in the register of non-state universities.
- October 1993 - The university obtained the right to education at the undergraduate majoring in management and marketing.
- 1996 - The power to conduct consistent and complementary degree majoring in management and marketing.
- 1997 - Eligibility to undergraduate majoring in finance and banking.
- 1998 - The decision to launch a new field of study: administration. The Central Commission for Scientific Titles and Degrees awarded the university the right to confer the degree of doctor of economic sciences in the field of management science.
- 1999 - European Foundation for Management Development EFMD awarded EQUIS accreditation Kozminski University - European Quality Improvement (European Quality Improvement System). KU was the 16th business school in Europe to be accredited by EQUIS.
- 2000 - Decision of the Bureau of the Conference of Rectors of Academic Schools in Polish Kozminski Academy was granted the status of university membership CRASP, as the only non-public university in this group.
- 2001 - Kozminski Academy gained the power to conduct a five-year master's programs in law and the powers to pursue graduate studies in finance and banking.
- 2002 - Eligibility to graduate majoring in administration.
- 2003 - Eligibility to higher professional studies in sociology. Decision of the Central Commission for Academic Degrees and Titles Academy of Entrepreneurship and Management. Kozminski University was granted the rights issue the postdoctoral degree in economic sciences in the discipline of management science.
- 2004 - The psychology of management and European studies programs are launched. Kozminski Academy is granted rights for doctoral studies in management.
- 2005 - The university received the confirmation for unconditional accreditation of EQUIS - the European Quality Improvement System.
- 2006 - Professor Witold ceremony of conferring an honorary doctorate Kieżun Kozminski Academy of Entrepreneurship and Management. Kozminski University (Poland's first honorary doctorate awarded by the university nonpublic).
- 2008 - The Central Commission for Academic Degrees and Titles decided to grant the Academy of Management and Entrepreneurship Kozminski authority to confer the degree of doctor of economic sciences in the discipline of economics. Moreover, the university has been accredited by AMBA for MBA programs. The minister of Science and Higher Education gave the university permission to conduct second degree in sociology and changed the name of the university from Academy of Management and Entrepreneurship Kozminski to Kozminski University.
- 2009 – Kozminski University received authorization to conduct studies I and II degree in economics. In addition, the Central Commission for Academic Degrees and Titles decided to grant permission Kozminski University to award the degree of Doctor of Law in the discipline of law.
- 2013 – Kozminski University obtained the rights to award PhD degrees in the field of finance.
- 2014 - Kozminski University received an award for the Erasmus academic exchange programme in the institutional category in the EDUinspirations competition.
- 2015 - The University of Szczecin awarded an honorary doctorate to Professor Andrzej K. Kozminski, President of Kozminski University. The Kozminski University established strategic cooperation with the world's oldest business school ESCP Europe from Paris, highly ranked in the Financial Times rankings (12th place). In the ranking of MBA programmes published by the Wprost weekly, the Executive MBA of Kozminski University was the winner. Prof. Dariusz Jemielniak became a member of the Board of Trustees of the Wikimedia Foundation.
- 2016 - The Central Commission for Degrees and Titles decided to grant Kozminski University the right to confer the degree of Doctor of Laws in the discipline of law. KU scientists created the Index of Sustainable Development allowing to assess the level and degree of sustainability of Poland's socio-economic development, as well as to prepare a forecast for the next few years. Prof. Andrzej Koźmiński, President of Kozminski University, received the Vector statuette of the employers' organisation in Poland, Pracodawcy RP, for creating one of the most important academic centres in Poland and for building a model cooperation between science and business.
- 2017 - KU President Prof. Andrzej K. Koźmiński received in Paris the honorary doctorate of ESCP Europe, the world's oldest business university. KU successfully passed the AACSB re-accreditation process. The university signed an agreement with CIMA, thanks to which students of finance and accounting at KU have the opportunity to obtain an international diploma in managerial accounting.
- 2018 - The Polish Accreditation Committee awarded KU with a distinction grade for education in the field of finance and accounting. Professor Edward C. Prescott, winner of the Bank of Sweden's Alfred Nobel Prize in Economics in 2004, was awarded an honorary doctorate by KU. KU's Master in Finance and Accounting programme has been accredited by ACCA.
- 2019 - The Polish Accreditation Committee awarded the university a distinction grade for the third time for the management faculty. The Bloomberg Laboratory was established at KU. This allows students to work on the basis of real analyses, indicators and information from all financial markets in the world. The consortium established in Paris with ESCP Europe, Kozminski University and four other leading business universities announced the EU4E project - the establishment of the European University, which aims to teach entrepreneurship.
- 2020 - The University was included in the first edition of the Positive Impact Rating as one of 30 business schools in the world and the only one from Poland.

== Academics ==
The school runs programs in Polish and in English at bachelor, master, postgraduate, MBA and doctorate levels in management, finance, law, European studies, sociology, psychology in management and administration.

As of 2011, it is the only private business school in Poland with full doctorate (since 1998) and habilitation (since 2003) granting rights in management. It is also entitled by the Ministry of Science and Higher Education to grant PhD titles in law and economics (since 2009).

== Accreditations ==
In 1999 Kozminski University was the first business school in Central and Eastern Europe to receive EQUIS accreditation. In 2005 the accreditation was extended to the full, unconditional one. Kozminski University was also the first business school in Central and Eastern Europe accredited by AACSB (since 2011), AMBA, and CEEMAN. Kozminski University is also the only business school in Poland accredited with distinction by National Accreditation Committee. In addition, the university is a full member of ELFA (European Law Faculties Association) and EUA (European University Association).

== Awards and rankings ==
Kozminski University has been highly ranked by a number of international and domestic university rankings.

=== Financial Times rankings ===
- European Business Schools 45th in 2020 (41st in 2014, 37th in 2013, 37th in 2012).
- Masters in Finance Pre-experience 20th in 2020 (15th in 2017, 18th in 2016, 21st in 2014, 19th in 2013, 21st in 2012).
- Masters in Management 39th in 2020 (35th in 2014, 25th in 2013, 28th in 2012).
- Global EMBA 63rd in 2020 (68th in 2017, 72nd in 2016).
- European Business Schools Ranking 2024 (38th in Europe)
- Global Masters in Finance 2024 (44th worldwide)
- Global Masters in Management 2024 (58th globally)
- Executive MBA 2024 (62nd globally)

=== Eduniversal ranking ===
Ranks among the best 1,000 business schools in 154 countries by region and country.

- Kozminski University International Business School holds second place in 2018 with four palms as "Top Business School With Significant International Influence" (second in 2013, second in 2012, second in 2011).

== Campus ==
Kozminski's 3.4 hectares (8.4 acres) campus consists of four buildings (A, B, C and D) with a total area of approximately 20,000 m^{2} (220,000 sq ft). It is located in Praga Północ, a north-eastern district of Warsaw. The school has six large auditoriums (each seating between 100 and 200 people) as well as 26 classrooms (seating 50 to 100 people) and 24 workshop classrooms (seating up to 50 people). Larger classrooms and all auditoriums possess audio-visual equipment. The school owns five seminar and discussion group rooms, as well as a Senate Hall (seating 120 people), four computer labs and two server rooms. The three cafeterias are available for faculty and students and are located on the premises as well as a bookstore, two photocopying offices, five coffee machines, a cash machine, a post office, five student organization offices and three guest apartments for visiting faculty members. Furthermore, there are 98 fully equipped faculty and administration offices. The first and second floors of Building D have newly installed Coffee Machines, along with a Snack and drink stop attached with a refrigerator (self-checkout).

== Student life ==
Kozminski University offers a vibrant student life with numerous opportunities for engagement:

- Student organizations: The university hosts various scientific and cultural clubs, including the Culture Club, which organizes cultural events, art exhibitions, and workshops.
- Student council: The KU Student Council represents the student body, supports various initiatives, and organizes events to enhance campus life.
- Integration events: Events like hazings, halfway parties, and "Kozminalia" are organized to foster community and provide entertainment.
- Sports and fitness: The Kozminski Sport Club offers facilities such as a modern gym, fitness rooms, and spaces for team sports like basketball and volleyball.

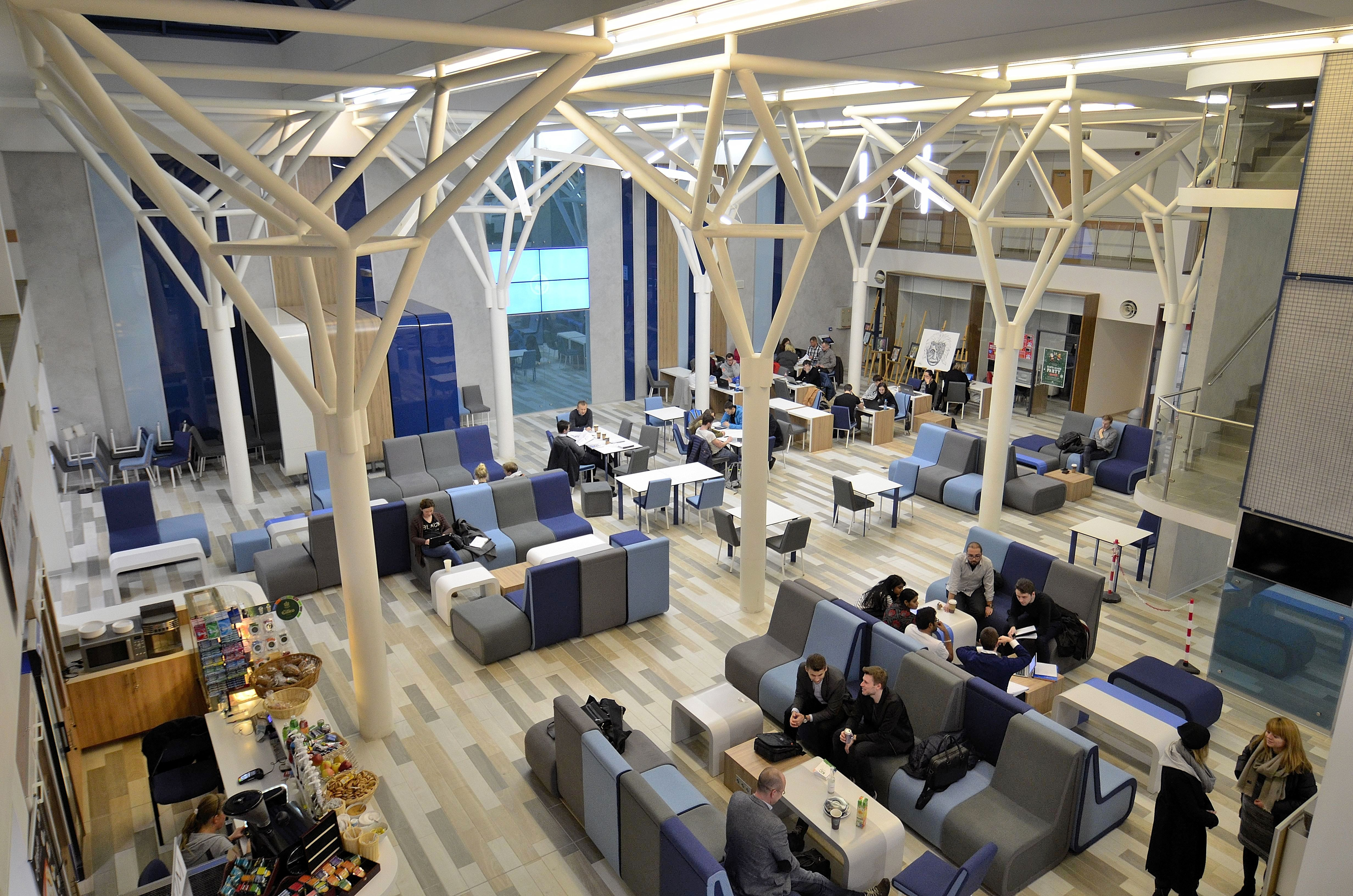
Atrium Akademia Leona Koźmińskiego

== Publisher ==
Kozminski University is the publisher of a quarterly academic journal the Management and Business Administration. Central Europe. "MBA.CE" is a national scientific periodical about management in public and private sector institutions. The periodical is a dialogue platform for scientists and practicians. "MBA. CE" includes articles regarding the following fields: human resource management, theory of organization, strategic management, corporate order, managerial economy, accounting and finance. The articles can be based in such disciplines as economy, psychology, sociology or law. Moreover, MBA. CE" is included in the list of periodicals receiving 8 points from the Ministry of Science and Higher Education.

== Partner universities ==
Kozminski University collaborates with more than 200 partner universities, where students can spend one or more semesters of their study program. These are e.g. BI Norwegian Business School, Norwegia; European Business School, Niemcy; Grenoble Graduate School of Business, Francja; Hong Kong University of Science and Technology (HKUST), Hongkong; Nagoya University of Commerce and Business, Japonia; Pontifícia Universidade Católica de São Paulo, Brazylia; Skema, Francja; Stockholm Business School, Szwecja; University College London, Wielka Brytania; University of Exeter, Wielka Brytania; University of Bradford, Wielka Brytania; Universität Mannheim, Niemcy; University of Michigan – Flint, USA; Universität Zürich, Szwajcaria; Wirtschaftsuniversität Wien, Austria, oraz wiele innych.

== University authorities ==
Rector: Prof. Grzegorz Mazurek

President: Prof. Witold T. Bielecki

Honorary President: Prof. Andrzej Koźmiński

Vice-rector for Research and Faculty Development: Prof. Robert Rządca

Vice-rector for Didactic Affairs: Prof. Aleksander Maziarz

Vice-rector for Cooperation with the Environment, Dean of the College of Law: Prof. Bartłomiej Nowak

Vice-Rector for International Relations and ESR: Prof. Aleksandra Przegalińska

Dean of the College of Management: Prof. PhD Mariola Ciszewska-Mlinarič

Dean of the College of Finance & Economics: Prof. Jacek Tomkiewicz

== Structure ==
=== College of Management and College of Finance and Economics ===
- Department of Accounting
- Department of Administration and Administrative Law
- Department of Banking, Insurance and Risk
- Department of Economic Psychology
- Department of Empirical Economic Analysis
- Department of Finance
  - Department of Finance
  - Department of Corporate Finance
  - Department of Public Finance
  - Department of Strategic Finance
- Department of Human Resource Management
- Department of Management
- Department of Management in Digital and Networked Societies
- Department of Marketing
- Department of Quantitative Methods & Information Technology
  - Division of Informatics
  - Division of Mathematical and Statistical Method
  - Division of Quality Management
  - Division of Simulation Games and Gamification
  - Project Management Division
- Department of Social Sciences
  - Department of Social Sciences
  - Division of Political Sciences
  - Division of Sociology
- Department of Strategy
- Division of Health Economics and Healthcare Management
- The Department of Entrepreneurship and Business Ethics

=== College of Law ===
- “Student Legal Clinic” Interdepartmental Unit
- Department of Administrative and Public Business Law
- Department of Civil Law
  - Division of Civil Proceedings
  - Division of Commercial Law and Capital Market
  - Division of International Private Law
- Department of Criminal Law
- Department of International Law and European Union Law
  - Department of International Law and European Union Law
  - Division of Intellectual Property Law
- Department of Theory, Philosophy and History of Law
- Division of Constitutional Law
- Division of Financial and Tax Law
- Labour Law Division

=== Research Centers ===
- Asia Research Center
- Business Ethics and Social Innovation Center
- Center for Analysis of Financial Systems
- Center for Economic Psychology and Decision Sciences
- Center for Logistics & Supply Chain Management
- Center for Research on Organizations and Workplaces (CROW)
- Center for Trust Research
- Centre for Research on Social Change and Human Mobility (CRASH)
- Centre for Space Studies
- Coaching and Mentoring Center
- Department of Management in Digital and Networked Societies, NeRDS Group
- Entrepreneurship Center
- Human-Machine Interaction Research Center
- Interdisciplinary Center
- Legal Interdisciplinary Science Center
- Positive Impact Entrepreneurship Research Center
- Research Center Cyberman
- Research Center for Innovative Growth Strategies
- Research Center for Public Management (PUMA)
- Research Center for Women and Diversity in Organizations
- Sustainable Development Center
- Transformation, Integration and Globalization Economic Research TIGER
- VAT Research Center

== See also ==
- List of universities in Poland
- List of business schools in Europe
