= Thomas Durand =

French management scholar

Thomas Durand FBAM FEURAM
- Known for: Technology strategy Organizational competence Management education
- Awards: Fellow of the British Academy of Management; Fellow of the European Academy of Management; Ordre des Palmes académiques

Academic background
- Education: École Centrale Paris; University of Wisconsin–Madison

Academic work
- Discipline: Strategic management Innovation management Technology management
- Institutions: Conservatoire national des arts et métiers École Centrale Paris

Thomas Durand FBAM FEURAM is a French academic and consultant specializing in strategic management, technology strategies, and innovation. He is a Professor honorary at the Conservatoire national des arts et métiers (Cnam) in Paris, where he held the Chair of Strategic Management.

== Academic career ==
Durand taught for 14 years at the Conservatoire national des arts et métiers (Cnam), where he held the chair in Strategic Management and served as head of IIM, MBA, and DBA programs. He also taught for 30 years at École Centrale Paris.

He founded CMI Strategies, a strategic management consultancy.

Durand is a Fellow of the European Academy of Management (2012) and served as its president from 2018 to 2020. He was elected to serve as Chair of the board for the period 2025 to 2027. He is also a Fellow of the British Academy of Management (FBAM).

== Research ==
Durand’s research focuses on strategic management, technology strategy, innovation processes, and organizational competence. His work examines how firms develop and renew technological and organizational capabilities in order to sustain competitive advantage. A recurring theme in his scholarship is competence-based strategy and its implications for strategic change.

He has contributed to the study of technology intelligence, technological substitution, foresight methods, and the management of research and development. His publications address issues such as intellectual property, interfirm cooperation, intrapreneurship, and the governance of innovation-driven companies. He directed the national foresight exercise “Technologies Clés 2005,” which examined priority technological domains for French industrial policy.

Durand has also written on management education and the evolution of business schools, co-editing volumes on the future of management education and research in Europe.

== Books ==
- Durand, T., Pokrovsky, A., & Shimada, S. (2025). Management d’entreprise 360° (3rd ed.). Paris: Dunod.
- Durand, T. (2025). Technology Strategies: Turning Technological Change into Strategic Advantage. Berlin: De Gruyter. 298 pp.
- Durand, T. (2020). Management d’entreprise 360° (2nd ed.). Paris: Dunod.
- Durand, T., & Shimada, S. (2018). Les processus stratégiques. Caen: EMS. 207 pp.
- Dameron, S., & Durand, T. (2017–2018). The Future of Management Education (2 vols., Vol. 1 February 2017; Vol. 2 January 2018). London: Palgrave Macmillan.
- Dameron, S., & Durand, T. (eds.) (2012). Redesigning Management Education and Research: Challenging Proposals from European Scholars. Cheltenham: Edward Elgar Publishing.
- Tschirky, H., et al., & Durand, T. (co-eds.) (2011). Managing Innovation Driven Companies: Approaches in Practice. Basingstoke: Palgrave Macmillan.
- Durand, T., & Dameron, S. (eds.) (2008). The Future of Business Schools: Scenarios and Strategies for 2020. Basingstoke: Palgrave Macmillan.
- Gibbert, M., & Durand, T. (eds.) (2007). Strategic Networks: Learning to Compete. SMS Book Series. Oxford: Blackwell Publishing.
- EITIM (with Durand, T.) (2004). Bringing Technology and Innovation into the Boardroom: Strategy, Innovation & Competences for Business Value. Basingstoke: Palgrave Macmillan.
- Durand, T., Koenig, G., & Mounoud, E. (eds.) (2000). Nouvelles perspectives en management stratégique. Caen: EMS.
