= Douglas Cumming =

Canadian financial economist (born 1970)

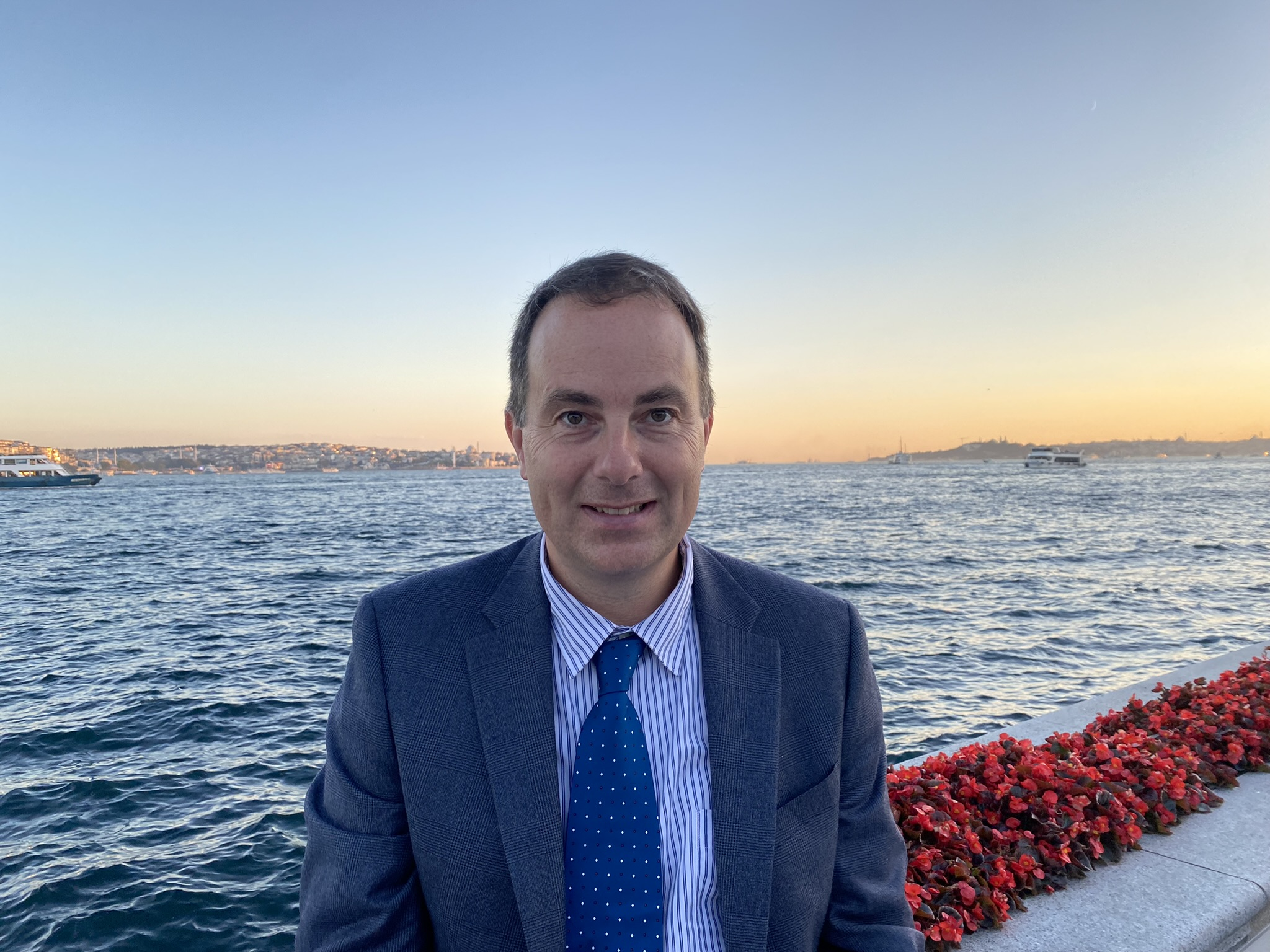
- Born: 1970 (age 55–56); Winnipeg, Canada
- Occupation: Financial economist
- Organization(s): Stevens Institute of Technology School of Business, Hoboken, New Jersey
- Title: Professor of Finance and Steven Shulman '62 Endowed Chair for Business Leadership
- Father: Gordon Cumming

Douglas J. Cumming (born 1970) is a Canadian financial economist. He is a Professor of Finance and the Steven Shulman '62 Endowed Chair for Business Leadership at Stevens Institute of Technology in the United States.

== Early life and education ==
Cumming was born in Winnipeg, Manitoba in 1970. His father, Gordon Rosevear Cumming, was a cardiologist and a member of the Manitoba Sports Hall of Fame. He earned a bachelor's degree in economics and finance from McGill University in Montreal, a master's degree in economics from Queen's University in Kingston, Ontario, and a JD and a PhD in economics and finance from the University of Toronto.

== Career ==
Cumming was associate professor of finance in the School of Banking and Finance at the University of New South Wales in Sydney, Australia, until 2005, when he was appointed director of the Severino Center for Technological Entrepreneurship at the Lally School of Management at Rensselaer Polytechnic Institute in Troy, New York.

Cumming and his wife, Sofia Johan, were both subsequently employed by the Schulich School of Business at York University in Toronto, where he was a full professor of Finance and Entrepreneurship, and the Ontario Research Chair. In 2018, they moved to the Florida Atlantic University College of Business, where Cumming was appointed the DeSantis Distinguished Professor of Finance and Entrepreneurship. In 2022, he became chair of the department.

He left Florida Atlantic University in August 2025, and was appointed Professor of Finance and the Steven Shulman '62 Endowed Chair for Business Leadership at Stevens Institute of Technology School of Business.

Cumming has published extensively on venture capital, including a 2007 paper arguing that tax-subsidized government venture capital funds crowded out non-subsidized funds in Canada. The tax credit was removed in Ontario in 2011 and federally in 2017. Other published research by Cumming includes findings that more people are likely to start businesses in countries with liberal bankruptcy laws and that a greater percentage of women on boards of directors is associated with less frequent and less severe fraud.

Cumming is on the advisory committee for the National Crowdfunding and Fintech Association of Canada. In 2020, he co-founded the RCF-ECGI Annual Conference on Corporate Finance and Governance, with his wife Sofia. The sixth edition of the conference was held in 2025.

Cumming formerly served as chief editor for British Journal of Management and Journal of Corporate Finance. He also served as Co-editor for Finance Research Letters. Since 2021 he serves as the managing editor-in-chief of the academic journals Review of Corporate Finance (RCF) and Journal of Alternative Investments. Cumming is a research member of the European Corporate Governance Institute.

== Books ==
- Cumming, Douglas J.; Johan, Sofia A. (2009). Venture Capital and Private Equity Contracting: An International Perspective. Burlington, Massachusetts: Academic Press / Elsevier. ISBN 9780080917542.
- Cumming, Douglas J.; Johan, Sofia A. (2014) [2009]. Venture Capital and Private Equity Contracting: An International Perspective (2nd ed.). Waltham, Massachusetts: Elsevier Science Academic Press. ISBN 978-0-12-409537-3.
- Cumming, Douglas J.; Dai, Na; Johan, Sofia A. (2013). Hedge Fund Structure, Regulation, and Performance around the World. New York: Oxford University Press. ISBN 9780199332762.
- Cumming, Douglas J.; Johan, Sofia A. (2019). Crowdfunding: Fundamental Cases, Facts, and Insights. London: Elsevier Science Academic Press. ISBN 9780128146378.

== Awards and honours ==
In 2021, Cumming and his collaborators received the 2021 Helena Yli-Renko Research Impact Award, sponsored by the Lloyd Greif Center for Entrepreneurial Studies at the USC Marshall School of Business. Cummings is a fellow of the British Academy of Management.
