= Georg von Krogh =

Norwegian organizational theorist

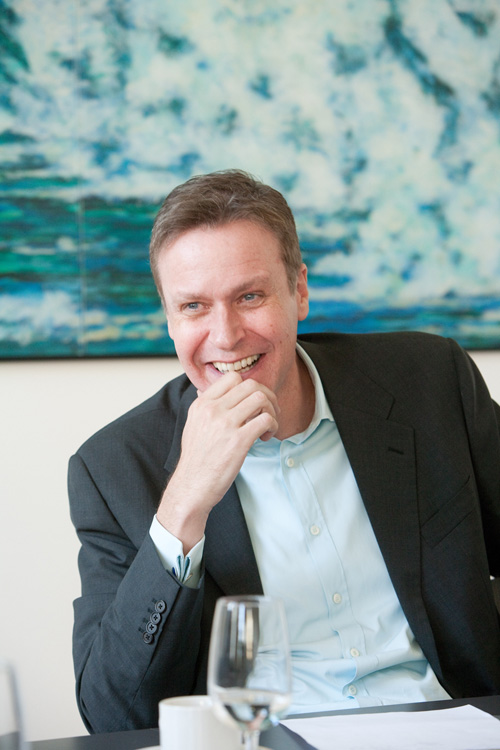
- Born: 24 May 1963 (age 63); Oslo, Norway
- Known for: Research on Open Source Software, the Private-collective model of innovation, organizational knowledge creation
- Scientific career
- Fields: Management, Competitive Strategies, Technological Innovation, Knowledge Management
- Workplaces: Swiss Federal Institute of Technology Zurich

Georg von Krogh (born 24 May 1963) is a Norwegian organizational theorist and Professor at the Swiss Federal Institute of Technology in Zurich (ETH Zurich) and holds the Chair of Strategic Management and Innovation. He currently serves as Head of the Department of Management, Technology, and Economics (D-MTEC) at ETH Zurich.

== Biography ==
Born in Oslo, Norway to a family of Danish nobility, Von Krogh received his MSc from the Norwegian University of Technology and Natural Science, and a Ph.D. from this university's Department of Industrial Economics and Technology Management.

Von Krogh started his academic career as assistant professor of Business Policy at SDA Bocconi, Bocconi University in Italy. Subsequently, he was associate professor of Strategy at the Norwegian School of Management, and Professor of Management at the University of St. Gallen in Switzerland, and a Director of this university's Institute of Management. He was also the President of the Research Commission at the University of St. Gallen.

He has been visiting professor at MIT's Sloan School of Management, Hitotsubashi University in Japan, Japan Advanced Institute of Science and Technology, the London School of Economics and Political Science, and an Affiliated Scholar with the Laboratory for Innovation Science (LISH) at Harvard University. He was the Head of the Department of Management, Technology, and Economics at the ETH Zurich during 2008–2011, and since 2025 returned to the position for a second term. He also served on the National Research Council of the Swiss National Science Foundation (SNF) during 2012–2020. From 2008 to 2014 he was a board member of the European Academy of Management (EURAM).

Currently, von Krogh serves as Chairman of the International Advisory Board at the Research Council of Norway. He holds an honorary position as Research Fellow at Judge Business School, University of Cambridge, is a member of the Scientific Advisory Board at the University of Vienna, and is a member of the Board of the University of Bergen. Additionally, he is an Associated Faculty Member at the Artificial Intelligence Center at ETH Zurich and was a member of ETH Zurich's Strategy Commission until 2024. Since 2021, he has also been part of the Risk Management Committee at ETH Zurich and he chairs the Global Advisory Board that advises the President of ETH Zurich in matters regarding its international strategy. He also serves as a member of the Scientific Council at EURAM, and is a member of the advisory board at the School of Management, Politecnico di Milano. Since 2024, he has served as Chairman of the Public Interest Committee of PwC Switzerland.

== Work ==
Von Krogh specializes in competitive strategy, technological innovation, and knowledge management. He has conducted research in several industries including financial services, media, computer software and hardware, life-sciences, and consumer goods. He teaches courses on Entrepreneurial Leadership, Strategic Management, and Innovation Theory and Research.

Von Krogh has consulted on strategy and trained executives for companies in Asia, Europe, and the USA. He has experience from being a board or advisory board member of various companies and NGOs, including PwC in Switzerland, Swiss Bank Corporation (UBS), SKAT Foundation, and the World Web Forum. He also serves as a member of the Chapter Board at the Swiss-American Chamber of Commerce. He was an academic fellow and faculty member of the World Economic Forum (2002–2007) where he was actively involved in scenario development for industries and economies.

Von Krogh serves as editorial board member of various journals which include Academy of Management Journal, Journal of Strategic Information Systems, European Management Review, European Management Journal, MIT Sloan Management Review, California Management Review, and Long Range Planning. He previously served as a Deputy Editor of Macro Theory and Research at the Academy of Management Journal on its 23rd editorial team (2022-2025), Senior Editor at Organisation Studies, and as an Associate Editor at Academy of Management Discoveries (2 terms). His awards and recognitions include for example the Association of American Publishers' "Best Professional Business Book Award", Harvard Business Review's "Breakthrough Idea," ETH's Teaching Award "Goldene Eule," European Management Review's "Best Paper Award 2012," and Journal of Strategic Information Systems' "Best Paper Award 2008." His work has been cited more than 50,000 times according to Google Scholar.

== Selected publications ==
- Ben-Menahem, S. M., He, V. F., von Krogh, G., & Wedl, C. (2026). Innovating More Formally: How Resistance-Led Participation Drives Expansion and Integration in Innovation Control Configuration. Academy of Management Journal.
- Ben‐Menahem, S. M., Woerter, M., & von Krogh, G. (2026). Performance feedback and change in R&D alliance portfolio breadth: The moderating role of economic conditions. Strategic Management Journal, 47(3), 804-830.
- Jonassen, Z., He, V. F., & von Krogh, G. (2026). Good lessons despite bad feelings: How boundary-spanning teams learn from collaboration failure. Organization Science, 37(1), 17-47.
- Gruber, M., Langley, A., Roberson, Q., & von Krogh, G. (2025). Special research forum—our transformational era: implications for management and organizations. Academy of Management Journal, 68(5), 875-880.
- Laamanen, T., Weiser, A. K., von Krogh, G., & Ocasio, W. (2025). Artificial intelligence in adaptive strategy creation and implementation: Toward enhanced attentional control in strategy processes. Long Range Planning, 58(4), 102561.
- Bermiss, Y. S., Farh, C. I., Simons, T., ter Wal, A. L., von Krogh, G., & Gruber, M. (2025). Reengaging with the classics. Academy of Management Journal, 68(3), 465-474.
- Herath Pathirannehelage, S., Shrestha, Y. R., & von Krogh, G. (2025). Design principles for artificial intelligence-augmented decision making: An action design research study. European Journal of Information Systems, 34(2), 207-229.
- Feuerriegel, S., Shrestha, Y. R., & von Krogh, G. (2025). A new machine learning approach answers what-if questions. MIT Sloan Management Review, 66(3).
- Reinecke, J., Little, L. M., Simons, T., Bliese, P., Dencker, J., Roberson, Q., ... & Gruber, M. (2024). Advancing management theory through interdisciplinary research: Challenges and opportunities. Academy of Management Journal, 67(6), 1421-1427.
- Hinds, P., & Von Krogh, G. (2024). Generative AI, emerging technology, and organizing: Towards a theory of progressive encapsulation. Organization Theory, 5(4), 26317877241293478.
- Krishna, V., Shrestha, Y. R., & von Krogh, G. (2024). “The double-edged sword of inflated help”: Unravelling the motivation crowding in community question-answering platforms. Plos one, 19(3), e0297627.
- Trantopoulos, K., Woerter, M., & von Krogh, G. (2024). Open innovation during the 2008 financial crisis. Industry and Innovation, 31(2), 159-182.
- Grimes, M., von Krogh, G., Feuerriegel, S., Rink, F., & Gruber, M. (2023). From Scarcity to Abundance: Scholars and Scholarship in an Age of Generative Artificial Intelligence. Academy of Management Journal, 66(6).
- Weiser, A. K., & von Krogh, G. (2023). Artificial intelligence and radical uncertainty. European Management Review, 20(4), 711-717.
- Shrestha, Y. R., von Krogh, G., & Feuerriegel, S. (2023). Building Open-Source AI. Nature Computational Science.
- Park, C., von Krogh, G., Stadtfeld, C., Meboldt, M, and Shrestha, Y. (2023). Healthcare hackathons as open innovation. Nature Reviews Bioengineering.
- von Krogh, G., Roberson, Q., and Gruber, M. (2023). Recognizing and Utilizing Novel Research Opportunities with Artificial Intelligence. Academy of Management Journal, 66(2), 367–373.
- Splitter, V., Dobusch, L., von Krogh, G., Whittington, R., & Walgenbach, P. (2023). Openness as Organizing Principle: Introduction to the Special Issue. Organization studies, 44(1), 7–27.
- Bailey, D. E., Faraj, S., Hinds, P. J., Leonardi, P. M., & von Krogh, G. (2022). We Are All Theorists of Technology Now: A Relational Perspective on Emerging Technology and Organizing. Organization Science, 33(1), 1–18.
- He, V. F., von Krogh, G., Sirén, C., & Gersdorf, T. (2021). Asymmetries between partners and the success of university-industry research collaborations. Research Policy, 50(10), 104356.
- de Jong, J. P., Ben-Menahem, S. M., Franke, N., Füller, J., & von Krogh, G. (2021). Treading new ground in household sector innovation research: Scope, emergence, business implications, and diffusion. Research Policy, 50(8), 104270.
- He, V. F., von Krogh, G., & Sirén, C. (2021). Expertise Diversity, Informal Leadership Hierarchy, and Team Knowledge Creation: A study of pharmaceutical research collaborations. Organization Studies.
- Shrestha, Y. R., He, V. F., Puranam, P. and von Krogh, G., (2021) Algorithm Supported Induction for Building Theory: How Can We Use Prediction Models to Theorize? Organization Science
- von Krogh, G., Kucukkeles, B., & Ben-Menahem, S. (2020) “Lessons in Rapid Innovation From the COVID-19 Pandemic. MIT Sloan Management Review
- He. F., Puranam P., Shrestha Y. R., & von Krogh, G. (2020) Resolving governance disputes in communities: A study of software license decisions. Strategic Management Journal.
- Ben-Menahem, S., Nistor-Gallo, R., Macia, G., von Krogh, G., & Goldhahn, J. (2020) How the new European regulation on medical devices will affect innovation. Nature Biomedical Engineering.
- Sirén, C., He, F., Wesemann, H., Jonassen, Z., Grichnik, D., & von Krogh, G. (forthcoming) Leader emergence in nascent venture teams: The critical roles of individual emotion regulation and team emotions. Journal of Management Studies.
- Gersdorf, T., He, V. F., Schlesinger, A., Koch, G., Ehrismann, D., Widmer, H., & von Krogh, G. (2019). Demystifying industry-academia collaboration. Nature Reviews Drug Discovery, 019-00001-2.
- von Krogh, G., Netland, T., & Wörter, M. (2018). Winning With Open Process Innovation. MIT Sloan Management Review, 59(2), 53-56.
- He, F., Sirén, C., Singh, S., Solomon, G. T., & von Krogh, G. (2017). Keep calm and carry on: Emotion regulation in entrepreneurs’ learning from failure. Entrepreneurship Theory and Practice.
- Trantopoulos, K., von Krogh, G., Wallin, M., & Wörter, M. (2017). External Knowledge and Information Technology: Implications for Process Innovation Performance. MIS Quarterly, 41(1), 287-300.
- Faraj, S., von Krogh, G., Monteiro, E., & Lakhani, K. (2016). Special Section Introduction - Online Community as Space for Knowledge Flows. Information Systems Research, 27(4), 668-684.
- Ben-Menahem, S., von Krogh, G., Erden, Z., & Schneider, A. (2016). Coordinating Knowledge Creation in Multidisciplinary Teams: evidence from Early-stage drug Discovery. Academy of Management Journal, 59(4), 1308-1338.
- von Hippel, E., & von Krogh, G. (2016). Identifying Viable ‘Need-Solution Pairs’: Problem Solving Without Problem Formulation. Organization Science, 27(1), 207-221.
- Spaeth, S., von Krogh, G., & He, F. (2015). Perceived Firm Attributes and Intrinsic Motivation in Sponsored Open Source Software Projects. Information Systems Research, 26(1), 224-237.
- Hacklin, F., Battistini, B., & von Krogh, G. (2013). Strategic choices in converging industries. MIT Sloan Management Review, 55(1), 65-73.
- Garriga, H., von Krogh, G., & Spaeth, S. (2013). How constraints and knowledge impact open innovation. Strategic Management Journal, 34(9), 1134-1144.
- von Krogh, G., Nonaka, I., & Rechsteiner, L. (2012). Leadership in organizational knowledge creation: A review and framework. Journal of Management Studies, 49(1), 240-277.
- von Krogh, G., Haefliger, S., Spaeth, S., & Wallin, M. W. (2012). Carrots and rainbows: Motivation and social practice in open source software development. MIS Quarterly, 36(2), 649-676.
- von Krogh, G., Battistini, B., Pachidou, F., & Baschera, P. (2012). The changing face of corporate venturing in biotechnology. Nature Biotechnology, 30(10), 911-915.
- Haefliger, S., Jäger, P., & von Krogh, G. (2010). Under the radar: Industry entry by user entrepreneurs. Research Policy, 39(9), 1198-1213.
- Gächter, S., von Krogh, G., & Haefliger, S. (2010). Initiating private-collective innovation: The fragility of knowledge sharing. Research Policy, 39(7), 893-906.
- Raisch, S., & von Krogh, G. (2009). Focus intensely on a few great innovation ideas. Harvard Business Review, 87(10), 32.
- Nonaka, I., & von Krogh, G. (2009). Tacit knowledge and knowledge conversion: Controversy and advancement in organizational knowledge creation theory. Organization Science, 20(3), 635-652.
- Haefliger, S., von Krogh, G., & Spaeth, S. (2008). Code reuse in open source software. Management Science, 54(1), 180-193.
- Maillart, T., Sornette, D., Spaeth, S., & von Krogh, G. (2008). Empirical tests of Zipf’s law mechanism in open source Linux distribution. Physical Review Letters, 101(21), 218701-1--218701-4.
- von Krogh, G., & Haefliger, S. (2007). Nurturing respect for IP in China. Harvard Business Review, 85(4), 23-24.
- Raisch, S., & von Krogh, G. (2007). Navigating a path to smart growth. MIT Sloan Management Review, 48(3), 65-72.
- von Krogh, G. (2006). Customers demand their slice of IP. Harvard Business Review, 84, 45-46.
- von Krogh, G., & von Hippel, E. (2006). The promise of research on open source software. Management Science, 52(7), 975-983.
- Nonaka, I., von Krogh, G., & Voelpel, S. (2006). Organizational knowledge creation theory: Evolutionary paths and future advances. Organization Studies, 27(8), 1179-1208.
- von Hippel, E., & von Krogh, G. (2003). Open source software and the “private-collective” innovation model: Issues for organization science. Organization Science, 14(2), 209-223.
- von Krogh, G., Spaeth, S., & Lakhani, K. R. (2003). Community, joining, and specialization in open source software innovation: a case study. Research Policy, 32(7), 1217-1241.
- von Krogh, G. (2003). Networks of Innovation: Change and meaning in the age of the Internet. Research Policy, 32, 1714-1716.
- von Krogh, G., & Von Hippel, E. (2003). Special issue on open source software development. Research Policy, 32(7), 1149-1157.
- von Krogh, G., & Cusumano, M. A. (2001). Three strategies for managing fast growth. MIT Sloan Management Review, 42(2), 53-62.
- von Krogh, G., & Roos, J. (1996). A Tale of the unfinished. Strategic Management Journal (1986-1998), 17(9), 729-739.
- von Krogh, G., Roos, J., & Slocum, K. (1994). An essay on corporate epistemology. Strategic Management Journal, 15(S2), 53-73.
