= Elisabeth Kelan =

British academic

- Born: West Germany
- Citizenship: Germany; British
- Education: London School of Economics and Political Science (LSE) (MSc) (PhD)
- Known for: Gender Fatigue
- Scientific career
- Fields: Management; Sociology; Gender Studies
- Workplaces: King's College London; London Business School; London School of Economics and Political Science (LSE)
- Website: elisabethkelan.com

Elisabeth Kelan is a German-British academic, executive, researcher and writer and a leading scholar on gender, generations and leadership in organizations. She coined the term gender fatigue which refers to organisations difficulties to combat gender discrimination despite recognising its existence. Kelan has presented her research at various international institutions and collaborated with numerous organisations.

She is a professor of leadership and organisation at Essex Business School and director of the International Centre for Women Leaders at Cranfield School of Management. She writes for Routledge, at the journal Gender, Work and Organization and the British Journal of Management. In 2017, she was voted one of the Most Influential Thinkers by Human Resources Magazine in 2017.

== Early life and education ==
Kelan was born in West Germany and earned a masters and a PhD from the London School of Economics and Political Science (LSE).

== Career ==
Kelan has worked as an Associate Professor in the Department of Management at King's College London, Senior Research Fellow in the Centre for Women in Business at London Business School, and at the Gender Institute of the London School of Economics.

In 2012, she was a Visiting Professor at Georgetown University. In 2017, she was the board of the Women's Empowerment Principles initiative of UN Women and the UN Global Compact and also the Dahlem International Network Professor for Gender Studies 2017–18 at Freie Universität Berlin.

Kelan is a professor of Leadership and Organisation at Essex Business School and Director of the Cranfield International Centre for Women Leaders at Cranfield School of Management. She holds editorial roles for Routledge, at the journal Gender, Work and Organization and the British Journal of Management

Since 2015, she has also taught regularly at the United Nations System Staff College worldwide.

== Research ==
Kelan is considered a leading thinker, researcher and academic on leadership practice, on women, and on gender.

She has conducted research on gender in high-tech professions and in MBA education, generational changes and what Millennials want from work, identity in organizations and organizational culture, subtle effects of stereotypes and inequality, leadership development, gender and generational diversity, and organizational policy and corporate responsibility.

For her British Academy fellowship, analyzed the role of management as change agents. showed that middle managers are key to improving inclusion, but that diversity and representation in top management is necessary to provide the impetus for middle management actions.

== Work ==
Kelan has presented her research at various international institutions including the United Nations in 2007, 2009, and 2010, the European Central Bank in Frankfurt, the Organization for Security and Co-operation in Europe (OSCE) in 2011 and 2012; and the Council of Europe and CERN in 2013. She has collaborated with numerous organisations including Google, General Electric, Airbus, PwC, and KPMG,

She has featured on TED and in Cosmopolitan magazine. Notoriously, in June 2008, she organised the “Humanising Work” symposium with Judy Wajcman, then visiting professor at the Lehman Brothers Centre for Women in Business at London Business School. The groundbreaking seminar attempted to expose business academics and practitioners to current research and knowledge in the social sciences and saw two talks by (Lord) Anthony Giddens and Richard Sennett. Stefan Stern from the Financial Times likened this event to an academic version of the Rumble in the Jungle and referred to it as the "Dialectic in the Park" – a reference to London Business School's Regent's Park campus. He authored several articles on the topic of "What sociologists can teach managers" discussing his impression that sociologists could help you run your company better than management gurus.

== Views ==
Kelan has welcomed the use of artificial intelligence to improve diversity in the workplace but warned that it would be naïve to presume that AI will do away with unconscious biases. She is known for having coined the term gender fatigue to denote that whilst gender discrimination evidently continues to exist in organizations, people struggle to deny its existence in their attempt to construct their workplaces as gender neutral.

== Honours ==
Kelan was a British Academy Fellow for 2014 and 2015. She received the Leadership Award for the Most Influential Leadership Research in 2016 and was voted one of the Most Influential Thinkers by Human Resources Magazine in 2017.

== Select bibliography ==
=== Books ===
- Kelan, E.K. (2012) Rising Stars: Developing Millennial Women as Leaders, Basingstoke: Palgrave Macmillan.
- Kelan, E.K. (2009) Performing Gender at Work, Basingstoke: Palgrave.

=== Articles ===
- Kelan, E.K. and Wratil, P. (2018) 'Post-heroic Leadership, Tempered Radicalism and Senior Leaders as Change Agents for Gender Equality', In: European Management Review.
- Gill, R., Kelan, E.K., Scharff, C. (2017) 'A Postfeminist Sensibility at Work', In: Gender, Work and Organization, 24:3, 226–244.
- Adamson, M., Kelan, E.K., Lewis, P., Rumens, N., Śliwa, M. (2016) 'The Quality of Equality: Thinking Differently about Gender Inclusion in Organizations', In: Human Resource Management International Digest, 24:7, 8–11.
- Kelan, E.K. (2014) 'From Biological Clocks to Unspeakable Inequalities: The Intersectional Positioning of Young Professionals', In: British Journal of Management, 25:4, 790–804.
- Kelan, E.K. (2014) 'Organising Generations – What Can Sociology Offer to the Understanding of Generations at Work?', In: Sociology Compass, 8:1, 20–30.
- Kelan, E.K. (2013) 'The Becoming of Business Bodies – Gender, Appearance and Leadership Development', In: Management Learning, 44:1, 45–61.
- Kelan, E.K. (2013) 'The Gender Quota and Female Leadership – Effects of the Norwegian Gender Quota on Board Chairs and CEOs', In: Journal of Business Ethics, 117:3, 449–466.
- Kelan, E.K. and Dunkley Jones, R. (2010) 'Gender and the MBA', In: Academy of Management Learning and Education, 9:1, 26–43.
- Kelan, E.K. (2010) 'Gender Logic and (Un)Doing Gender at Work', In: Gender, Work and Organization, 17:2, 174–194.
- Kelan, E.K. (2009) 'Gender Fatigue - The Ideological Dilemma of Gender Neutrality and Discrimination in Organisations', In: Canadian Journal of Administrative Sciences, 26:3, 197–210.
- Kelan, E.K. (2008) 'Gender, Risk and Employment Insecurity: The Masculine Breadwinner Subtext', In: Human Relations, 61:9, 1171–1202.
- Kelan, E.K. (2008) 'The Discursive Construction of Gender in Contemporary Management Literature', In: Journal of Business Ethics, 18:2, 427 – 445.
- Kelan, E.K. (2008) 'Emotions in a Rational Profession: The Gendering of Skills in ICT work', In: Gender, Work and Organization, 15:1, 49–71.
- Kelan, E.K. (2008) 'Bound by Stereotypes?', In: Business Strategy Review, 19:1, 4–7.
- Kelan, E.K. (2008) 'Emotions in a Rational Profession: The Gendering of Skills in ICT Work', In: Gender, Work and Organization, 15:1, 49–71.
- Kelan, E.K. (2006) 'Zur (De)Konstruktion von Geschlecht in neuer Managementliteratur' ((De)Constructing Gender in Newer Management Literature). In: Bendl, R. (ed.) Betriebswirtschaftslehre und Frauen- und Geschlechterforschung, Teil 1: Verortung geschlechterkonstituierender (Re-)Produktionsprozesse, Frankfurt/Main: Peter Lang.
