= Merchant Taylors' Hall, London =

Livery company hall, Threadneedle Street, City of London

Coordinates: 51.5141°N 0.0854°W

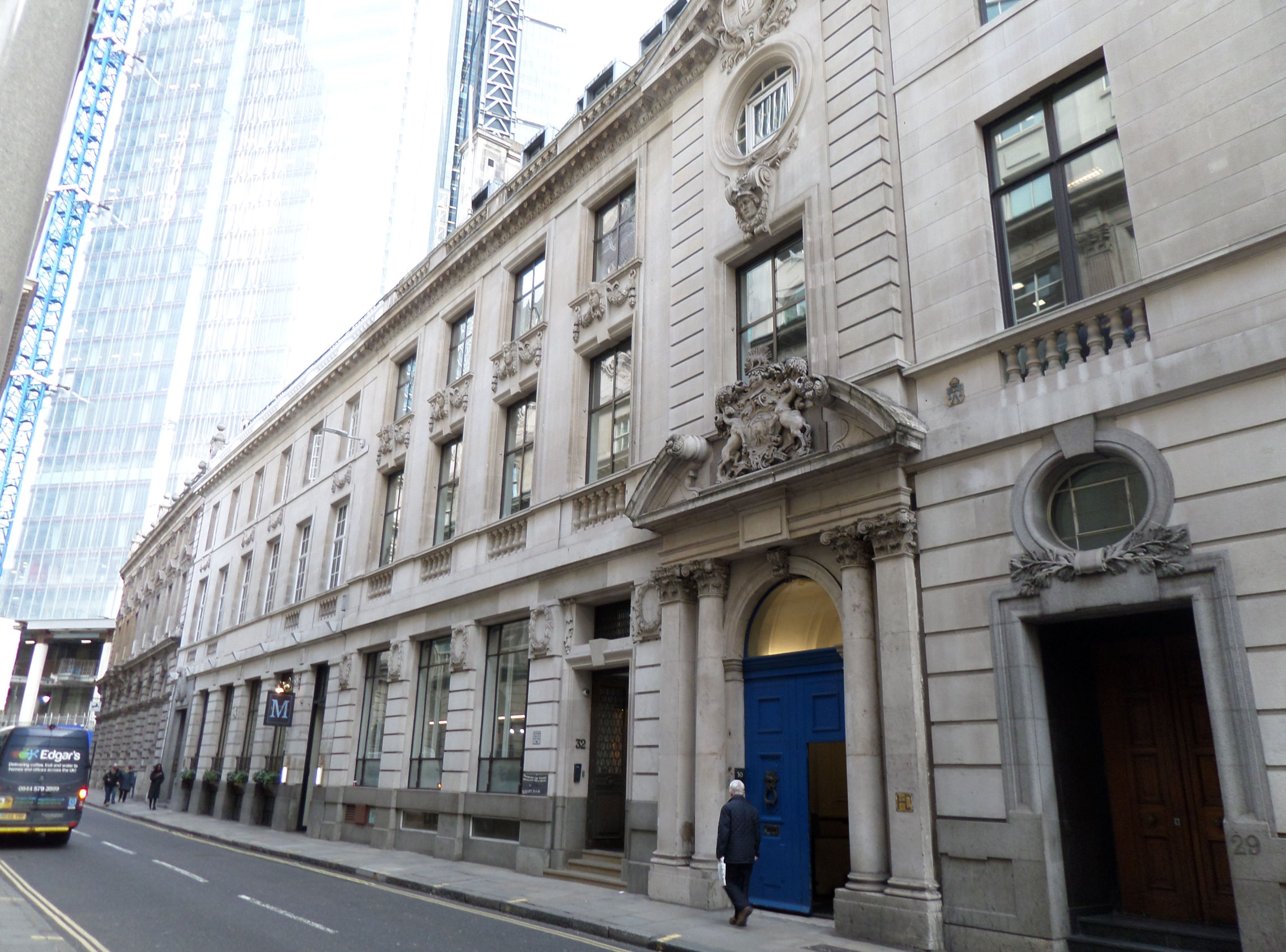
The entrance on Threadneedle Street

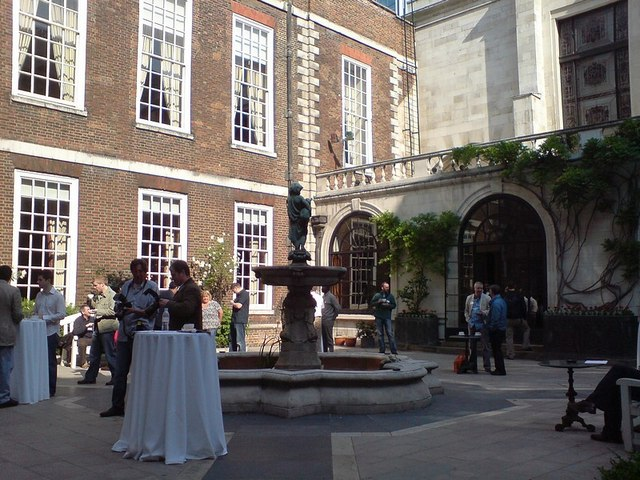
The courtyard of Merchant Taylors Hall

The Merchant Taylors' Hall, London is the seat of the Worshipful Company of Merchant Taylors, one of the Twelve Great Livery Companies of the City of London surviving from Medieval times.

The Company has occupied its present site between Threadneedle Street and Cornhill since 1347. It lies in the ward of Cornhill. It is thus one of only 40 remaining livery halls in London.

== History ==
The first Hall was built at some date between the years 1347 and 1392 when it was known as "Taillourshalle"; between then and the Great Fire of London in 1666, no records show structural alteration of any importance except the rebuilding of the roof between 1586 and 1588.

On 16th July 1607, the Hall hosted a great banquet in honour of King James I. New furnishings were ordered, the garden walls raised to improve security, and a new window created into the hall from a private chamber where the King and Queen ate in state while observing the proceedings. The Prince of Wales dined in the main hall and made a speech.

The Merchant Taylor's Hall was the venue for the Lord Mayor's masque, Thomas Middleton's lost Masque of Cupids, performed on 4 January 1614 to celebrate the wedding of Robert Carr, 1st Earl of Somerset and Frances Carr.

At the time of the Great Fire, the roof and the interior were gutted, leaving only the walls and foundations. The building was restored and embellished with tapestries, stained glass windows, chandeliers and panelling; but during the London Blitz in September 1940, it was hit by a number of German Luftwaffe incendiary bombs and the Hall with both Galleries, the Western Entrance, the Grand Staircase and the Parlour with the Drawing Room above were destroyed.

Certain important parts of the premises, however, escaped damage. These included the Library with its collection, inter alia, of early books, first editions and other interesting old volumes principally dealing with London; the Court Room, in which the walls are lined with portraits of Past Masters of the Company, and containing over the fireplaces two carved Coats of Arms representing the Company's original Grant of 1480 and the present Grant of 1586; the Great Kitchen, which has been in continuous use since 1425; and part of the Crypt of the late 14th-century Chapel which adjoined the East end of the Hall.

== Reconstruction ==
The work of reconstruction could not be started until some years after the end of World War II and the Hall itself was opened for use in March 1959. Although the interior had been gutted, the walls and foundations had survived and have been incorporated in the restored Hall, which still retains the basic proportions of the previous building although the style of decoration has been radically changed. Prominent features are the mahogany panelling, the stained glass windows containing the Arms of Honorary Freemen and benefactors and the Renatus Harris organ.

The new floor of the Hall is almost at the same level as the parquet floor of 1793, and sections of the three previous floor levels – the 14th-century beaten clay floor which was covered with rushes, the red tile floor laid in 1646 and the marble and Purbeck stone floor dated from 1675 – have been preserved and can still be seen in a trap in the floor.

The Company's collection of plates dates mainly from the 17th century as most of their earlier possessions were either sold or melted down during the English Civil War to meet the King's demands for money, or were destroyed in the Great Fire of London. All that remains from these early days are the Corporate Seal of the Company (about 1502), the Cloth-yard (before 1509), the 16th-century ceremonial mace and the "Offley" and "Maye" rosewater dishes of 1590 and 1597.

== Accessibility ==
The Hall is open for housing public events through a dedicated events and catering company. It has been used for various purposes, ranging from entertainment industry photocalls such as for the Harry Potter film Harry Potter and the Goblet of Fire on 25 October 2005 (with Daniel Radcliffe, Emma Watson and Rupert Grint), to hosting official government and administrative events such as the Mayor of London & Greater London Authority's Women in London’s Economy programme on 28 February 2008 (with Ken Livingstone, Harriet Harman MP, Diane Abbott MP, Elisabeth Kelan and Sandra Fredman).
