= WIFU Foundation =

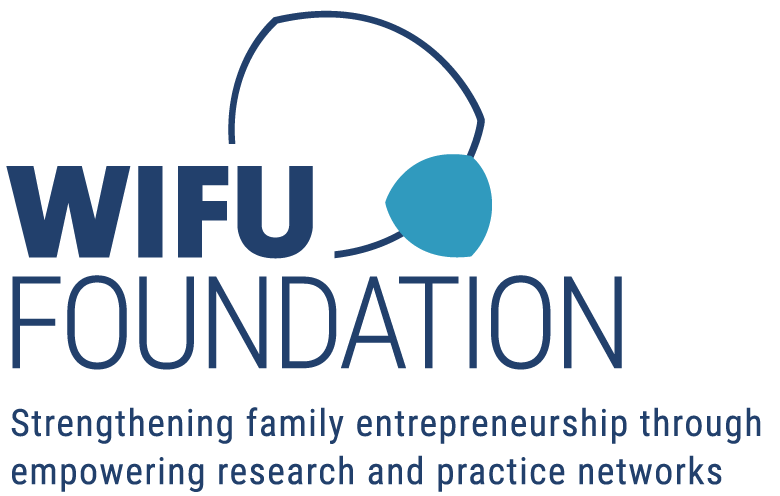
- Established: 3rd September, 2009
- Founder: Tom A. Rüsen
- Type: Non-profit foundation
- Purpose: Promotion of research, teaching and practice transfer in the field of family entrepreneurship
- Location: Witten, Germany
- Staff: 12
- Website: www.wifu.de

The WIFU Foundation is a non-profit organisation based in Witten, Germany. It supports research, teaching, and knowledge transfer in the field of family entrepreneurship. Its activities include science communication on the characteristics of family businesses and business families, as well as fundraising to support these initiatives.

== History ==
The WIFU foundation was established in September 2009 by Tom A. Rüsen to provide long-term support for academic research and teaching in the field of family enterprises. It aimed to fund scholarships, research projects, and professorships that would generate practical insights for business families and their firms.

Its primary focus has been the funding of the Witten Institute for Family Business (WIFU) at Witten/Herdecke University.

Since 2020, the foundation has broadened its activities to support additional academic institutions and projects, including WHU – Otto Beisheim School of Management, EBS Universität für Wirtschaft und Recht, the International Family Enterprise Research Academy (IFERA), and the Department of Family Business at Junior Management Science (JUMS). During its first fifteen years, it allocated approximately €25 million to research, teaching, and academic events, including the endowment of five professorships and the organisation of numerous events for researchers and practitioners.

== Goals and Activities ==
The WIFU Foundation is committed to strengthening the long-term viability of family businesses. Its activities are centred on three main areas: research, teaching, and practical transfer.

1. Research: The foundation funds transdisciplinary research on challenges faced by family enterprises and business families, including digitalisation, succession, crisis and conflict management, governance, shareholder competence, and family strategy. It supports professorships, research staff, doctoral and postdoctoral scholarships, and awards research prizes at international conferences including IFERA, EIASM, and EURAM.
2. Teaching: The foundation promotes academic education for family business leaders and successors. It finances professorships and chairs in disciplines such as business administration, law, history, anthropology, and sociology.
3. Knowledge Transfer and Network Building: The foundation organises events that bring together academics and practitioners, including the WIFU Family Business Forum, the WIFU Working Groups, the WIFU Online Forum and the Witten Congress for Family Businesses, the latter being the largest and oldest congress of its kind in Europe. Knowledge transfer is further supported through multilingual open-access resources, including practical guides, studies, videos, podcasts and the Schriften zu Familienunternehmen series, which are available through its digital library. It also maintains an active presence on social media platforms including LinkedIn, Instagram and YouTube to reach a broader audience of family business stakeholders, and the interested public.

== Organisation ==
The WIFU foundation is governed by three bodies: the Executive Board, the Board of Trustees, and the Council of Major Donors. The Executive Board, led by Tom A. Rüsen, manages strategic and operational activities. The Board of Trustees monitors the Executive Board and contributes to the foundation’s strategic development. Members include representatives from academia and business such as Frank Stangenberg-Haverkamp (Chairman) and Christiane Dethleffsen (Deputy Chairwoman). Other trustees include Fabian Kienbaum, Elena von Metzler, and Wilfried Neuhaus-Galladé (as of September 2024). The foundation is further supported by a network of over 80 family businesses, which provide financial contributions and advisory input.

== Impact ==
The WIFU Foundation has been described as one of the leading institutions in the German-speaking world for promoting research and knowledge transfer in the field of family entrepreneurship. Its work contributes to the professionalisation of family businesses and business families through a practice-oriented, interdisciplinary approach.

== Publications (selection) ==
=== Practical Guides ===
- Groth, Torsten; Rüsen, Tom A.; Schlippe, Arist von (2020). "Securing succession in a family business across generations – How succession may be organised in businesses and among shareholders". WIFU Foundation.
- Caspary, Simon; Rüsen, Tom A.; Kleve, Heiko (2025). "Learning to Let Go: How the Senior Generation Can Proactively Shape the Handover Process and Their Own Transformation". WIFU Foundation.
- Rüsen, Tom A.; Fröhlich, Konrad (25 October 2024). "Crisis Management and Crisis Resilience in Family Businesses". WIFU Foundation.
- Rüsen, Tom A.; von Schlippe, Arist; Groth, Torsten (2022). "Family Strategy Development in Business Families – Content and Forms of Family Governance and Family Management Systems". WIFU Foundation.
- Rüsen, Tom A. (2020). "Ownership Competence in Business Families – the success factor for long-lasting family businesses". WIFU Foundation.

=== Practical Articles ===
- Rüsen, Tom A.; Nadler, Monika (26 June 2025). "Your Family's Mental Model Might Be Fueling Its Conflicts". WIFU-Stiftung | Die WIFU-Stiftung fördert Forschung, Praxistransfer und Lehre auf dem Gebiet des Familienunternehmertums. FamilyBusiness.org.
- Simons, Fabian; Mattart, Raphaëlle; Kleve, Heiko (10 April 2025). "Family Firms Prosper When Shareholders Think Like Trustees". FamilyBusiness.org.
- Caspary, Simon; Rüsen, Tom A.; Kleve, Heiko (19 February 2025). "Senior Leaders: Prepare Early to Let Go of the Business". FamilyBusiness.org.

=== Studies ===
- Rüsen, Tom A.; Löhde, Ann Sophie (2021). "The Business Family and Its Family Strategy: Insights into the Lived Practice of Family Governance". WIFU Foundation.
- Rüsen, Tom A.; Orenstrat, Ruth; Binz Astrachan, Claudia (2023). "Ownership Competence in Business Families – Current Trends and Developments". WIFU.
- Heider, Anne K.; Rüsen, Tom A.; Hülsbeck, Marcel; Dethleffsen, Carla H.; Orenstrat, Ruth (2021). "Collaboration Between Start-Ups and Family Businesses: Motives, Expectations and Success Factors in Collaborations between Established Companies and New Businesses". WIFU Foundation.
- Otten-Pappas, Dominique; Jäkel-Wurzer, Daniela (2021). "Female Successors: The Exception Rather Than the Rule. A Study of the Current Situation of General Transition in German Family Businesses". WIFU Foundation.

=== Books ===
- Kleve, Heiko; Köllner, Tobias, ed. (2023). Sociology of the Business Family: Foundations, Recent Developments, and Future Perspectives. Wiesbaden: Springer Fachmedien Wiesbaden. doi:10.1007/978-3-658-42216-5. ISBN 978-3-658-42215-8.
- Rüsen, Tom A.; Kleve, Heiko; von Schlippe, Arist (2021). Managing Business Family Dynasties: Between Family, Organisation, and Network. Management for Professionals. Cham: Springer Nature (Springer). doi:10.1007/978-3-030-82619-2. ISBN 978-3-030-82618-5.
- von Schlippe, Arist; Rüsen, Tom A.; Groth, Torsten (2021). The Two Sides of the Business Family: Governance and Strategy Across Generations. Management for Professionals. Cham: Springer. doi:10.1007/978-3-030-60200-0. ISBN 978-3-030-60199-7.

=== WIFU_compact ===
- WIFU Foundation (2022). "WIFU_compact 30: The Silent Power of Elementary Rules". WIFU Foundation.
- WIFU Foundation (2022). "WIFU_compact 25: Seven Paradoxes of Longevity". WIFU Foundation.
- WIFU Foundation (2022). "WIFU_compact 23: The Digital Maturity of the Business Family". WIFU Foundation.
- WIFU Foundation (2023). "WIFU_compact 05: Megatrends in Business Families". WIFU Foundation.

=== Videos ===
- von Schlippe, Arist (24 April 2025). "The Paradox of the Duplicated Family Business Families Part I" (Video). WIFU Foundation.
- von Schlippe, Arist (24 April 2025). "The Paradox of the Duplicated Family Business Families Part II" (Video). WIFU Foundation.
- Caspary, Sigrun (30 June 2021). "Longevity of Japanese Family Businesses" (Video). WIFU Foundation.
- Rüsen, Tom A. (April 2021). "Ten phases of succession" (Video). WIFU Foundation.
