= Torben Antretter =

German entrepreneur, economist

Torben Antretter (born January 28, 1992) is a German entrepreneur, economist, and author living in Switzerland.

== Career ==
After graduating from high school, Antretter studied business administration at the International School of Management and the Westfälische Wilhelms-Universität Münster. In 2017, he founded theLegalTech company RightNow, which filed for bankruptcy in 2025, whose investors include Carsten Maschmeyer and the founders of the hotel search engine Trivago. Antretter received his doctorate (Dr. oec. HSG) from the University of St. Gallen in 2020 with his dissertation entitled "Investment Decisions and Outcomes of Early Stage Investors". Since then, he has been lecturing on "Entrepreneurial Finance" at the University of St.Gallen. His career and entrepreneurial activities were most recently profiled by Harvard Business School as part of a case study.

== Publications (selection) ==
=== Scientific articles ===
- Do algorithms make better - and fairer - investments than angel investors? in: Harvard Business Review, 2020.
- Should business angels diversify their investment portfolios to achieve higher performance? The role of knowledge access through co-investment networks. in: Journal of Business Venturing, vol. 35(5), pp. 1–19, 2020.
- It's a peoples game, isn't it?! A comparison between the investment returns of business angels and machine learning algorithms. in: Entrepreneurship Theory and Practice, vol. 2020(1), pp. 1–38, 2020.
- New venture survival: A review and extension. in: International Journal of Management Reviews, vol. 22(4), pp. 378–407, 2020.
- Predicting new venture survival: A Twitter-based machine learning approach to measuring online legitimacy. in: Journal of Business Venturing Insights, vol. 11(1), pp. 1–8, 2019.

=== Book Publications ===
- Investment Decisions and Outcomes of Early Stage Investors. Dissertation, University of St.Gallen, Difo-Druck Untersiemau, 2020.
- Startup Navigator - Guiding Your Entrepreneurial Journey. Macmillan, 2020, ISBN 9781352010107.
- Entrepreneurial Finance: The Art and Science of Growing Ventures. Cambridge University Press, 2019. chapter 6: Deal Sourcing and Screening, ISBN 9781108421355, pp. 148–180.
- Startup Navigator: Das Handbuch. Frankfurter Allgemeine Buch, 2018, ISBN 9783956012211.
- Kapitalkostenermittlung als Grauzone wertorientierter Unternehmensführung. Monsenstein & Vannerdat, 2015, ISBN 9783961630967.
