= Adelina Broadbridge =

British researcher

Adelina Broadbridge is an academic specialising in research on charity retailing, retailing, and gender in management. She led the Stirling Management School in winning the Athena SWAN award.

She is Senior Lecturer at Stirling Management School, University of Stirling, UK. She is Editor-in-Chief of the Gender in Management journal.

Broadbridge was the founder of the Gender in Management Special Interest Group of the British Academy of Management and is Chair for the Gender in Management Track at the British Academy of Management Annual Conference.

== Publications ==
- Broadbridge, Adelina (2019). Women, Work and Management in the Middle East: Gender in Management: An International Journal. Emerald Publishing Limited. ISBN 978-1-83909-903-8.
- Broadbridge, A.M. and Fielden, S. L. (eds) (2018), Research Handbook of Diversity and Careers. Cheltenham: Edward Elgar.
- Broadbridge, A.M. and Fielden, S. L. (eds) (2015), Handbook of Gendered Careers in Management: Getting In, Getting On, Getting Out. Cheltenham: Edward Elgar. ISBN 9781782547693
- Broadbridge, A. (2012) Women, Careers and Retail Management. Saarbrucken: Lambert Academic Publishing, pp. 470.
- Ageism in retailing: myth or reality? Routledge, 2001. ISBN 9781315185972

== Awards and honours ==
- British Academy of Management Leadership Medal for Leadership, 2019
