= Andrew Pettigrew =

British academic (born 1944)

Andrew Marshall Pettigrew
- Born: 1944 (age 81–82)
- Known for: Process research; the Centre for Corporate Strategy and Change
- Awards: OBE; FBA

Academic background
- Education: University of Liverpool (BA); Manchester Business School (PhD)

Academic work
- Discipline: Management and organisation studies
- Institutions: Saïd Business School, University of Oxford; University of Bath School of Management; Warwick Business School

Andrew Marshall Pettigrew OBE FBA (born 1944) is Emeritus Professor of Strategy and Organisation at the Saïd Business School at the University of Oxford. A British academic specialising in industrial sociology and management research, he was previously dean of the University of Bath School of Management and, before that, a professor at Warwick Business School.

== Early life and education ==
Pettigrew trained in sociology and anthropology, and his early research included fieldwork among the Sebei people of Uganda. He earned a Bachelor of Arts in sociology at the University of Liverpool. He completed a PhD in industrial sociology at Manchester Business School in 1970.

== Academic career ==
Early in his career, Pettigrew held academic appointments at Yale University and London Business School.

He joined Warwick Business School, where in 1985 he established and directed the Centre for Corporate Strategy and Change until the mid-1990s, going on to serve as Professor of Strategy and Organisation and Associate Dean (Research).

From October 2003 he served as dean of the University of Bath School of Management. In 2008 he was appointed Professor of Strategy and Organisation at the Saïd Business School, University of Oxford, and Senior Golding Fellow at Brasenose College. He became Emeritus Professor in 2016.

== Research and key ideas ==
Pettigrew's research centres on decision-making, power, strategy development, and organisational change, drawing on his background in sociology and anthropology to emphasise the historical and social context in which strategy is made.

Between the mid-1970s and 1985 he conducted a longitudinal study of strategic change at Imperial Chemical Industries (ICI), published as The Awakening Giant: Continuity and Change in ICI.

Pettigrew helped establish the strategy process approach within management research and has described his approach as an attempt to "catch reality in flight", advocating longitudinal field research that locates present behaviour in its historical context.

A 2016 review by Harry Sminia identifies decision-making, organisational culture, strategic change, boards of directors and new public management among the "big problems and emerging phenomena" addressed across Pettigrew's research. His 1973 book on organisational politics was reissued by Routledge in 2001 as part of a series reprinting Tavistock Press titles. His 1979 article "On Studying Organizational Cultures" is reprinted in Organizational Culture (2009), a reference collection edited by Dvora Yanow and Sierk Ybema, alongside works by Edgar Schein and Linda Smircich.

A 1987 article drawing on the ICI research, "Context and Action in the Transformation of the Firm", introduced a model of context, content and process later called the "Pettigrew triangle". Management scholars Harry Sminia and Mark de Rond describe the article as launching a line of longitudinal, process-based research on strategic change.

With Terry McNulty, Pettigrew studied the power and influence of part-time board members in large UK companies. Their 1995 article on the subject was included in a retrospective review of Human Relations's most influential papers from 1987 to 1996, conducted by Paul Edwards.

Pettigrew also examined strategic change in the public sector, co-authoring two studies of restructuring in the British National Health Service: Shaping Strategic Change (1992), with Ewan Ferlie and Lorna McKee, and The New Public Management in Action (1996), with Ferlie, Lynn Ashburner and Louise Fitzgerald.

== Awards and recognition ==
Pettigrew was a co-founder and the first chairman of the British Academy of Management (1987–1990), and later served as its president (1990–1993).

In 1995 he was elected a distinguished scholar of the Organization and Management Theory Division of the Academy of Management. In 1999 he was elected one of the inaugural fellows (then styled academicians) of the Academy of Social Sciences. In 2002 he received the Academy's overall Distinguished Scholar Award; a retrospective academic review describes him as the first and only recipient based outside North America, and the University of Warwick's contemporary announcement described it as the first time the award had gone to a European scholar.

He was elected a Fellow of the British Academy in 2003. He was appointed Officer of the Order of the British Empire (OBE) in the 2009 New Year Honours for services to higher education.

He is the recipient of the Richard Whipp Lifetime Achievement Award from the British Academy of Management.

He holds honorary doctorates from the University of Linköping, Sweden (1989), the University of Liverpool (2010), Copenhagen Business School (2010), the University of Liège, Belgium (2015), and the Université de Sherbrooke, Canada (2022).

== Selected publications ==
- Pettigrew, A. M. (1973). The Politics of Organisational Decision Making. London: Tavistock. ISBN 978-0415264426.
- Pettigrew, A. M. (1979). "On Studying Organizational Cultures". Administrative Science Quarterly. 24 (4): 570–581. doi:10.2307/2392363.
- Pettigrew, A. M. (1985). The Awakening Giant: Continuity and Change in Imperial Chemical Industries. Oxford: Blackwell. ISBN 978-0631134558.
- Pettigrew, A. M. (1987). "Context and Action in the Transformation of the Firm". Journal of Management Studies. 24 (6): 649–670.
- Pettigrew, Andrew M. (1990). "Longitudinal Field Research on Change: Theory and Practice". Organization Science. 1 (3): 267–292. doi:10.1287/orsc.1.3.267.
- Pettigrew, A. M.; Whipp, R. (1991). Managing Change for Competitive Success. Oxford: Blackwell. ISBN 978-0631181828.
- Pettigrew, Andrew M. (1992). "The Character and Significance of Strategy Process Research". Strategic Management Journal. 13 (S2): 5–16. doi:10.1002/smj.4250130903.
- Pettigrew, A. M.; Ferlie, E.; McKee, L. (1992). Shaping Strategic Change: Making Change in Large Organizations: The Case of the National Health Service. London: Sage. ISBN 978-0-8039-8778-4.
- Pettigrew, Andrew; McNulty, Terry (1995). "Power and Influence in and around the Boardroom". Human Relations. 48 (8): 845–873.
- Ferlie, E.; Ashburner, L.; Fitzgerald, L.; Pettigrew, A. (1996). The New Public Management in Action. Oxford: Oxford University Press. ISBN 978-0-19-828903-6.
- Pettigrew, A. M.; Thomas, H.; Whittington, R., eds. (2002). The Handbook of Strategy and Management. London: Sage. ISBN 978-0761958888.
