= Lehman Brothers Centre for Women in Business =

The Lehman Brothers Centre for Women in Business is based at London Business School and was established as a joint partnership between London Business School and Lehman Brothers, the investment bank.

The Lehman Brothers Centre for Women in Business provides thought leadership in relation to women in business. The Centre acts as an interface between the world of academia and business and seeks to influence practice and policy through academic research.

== History ==
The centre was personally founded by Laura D'Andrea Tyson, the School's (first female) Dean, in 2006. Lynda Gratton, Professor of Management Practice and Organisational Behaviour at London Business School, is the executive director of the Lehman Brothers Centre for Women in Business. Lamia Walker is associate director of the centre and responsible for its administration. Since 2006, research is led and conducted by Dr Elisabeth Kelan, the centre's Senior Research Fellow.

In 2008, Judy Wajcman was a visiting professor at the centre. In June 2008, she organised the “Humanising Work” symposium with Elisabeth Kelan at London Business School. The groundbreaking seminar attempted to expose business academics and practitioners to current research and knowledge in the social sciences and saw two talks by (Lord) Anthony Giddens and Richard Sennett. Stefan Stern from the Financial Times likened this event to an academic version of the Rumble in the Jungle and referred to it as the "Dialectic in the Park" - a reference to London Business School's Regent's Park campus. He authored several articles on the topic of "What sociologists can teach managers" discussing his impression that sociologists could help you run your company better than management gurus.

The centre also introduced the Executive in Residence scheme with the intent to bridge the gap between theory and practice. Ellen Miller, managing director at Lehman Brothers and responsible for academic relations, currently holds this position.

== Research ==
It published two major reports:

- Inspiring Women: Corporate Best Practice in Europe (May 2007) describes the initiatives that European companies are taking to inspire women at work. The focus in the study is on the practices and processes that have a gender implication. This refers to those practices and processes that can have a specific impact on the experience of women, or have been designed to address a specific issue that women can potentially face.
- Innovative Potential: Men and Women in Teams (November 2007). In companies around the world executives are putting the capacity for innovation top of their strategic agenda. At the heart of the innovation strategy are people prepared and able to work collaboratively in teams and to exchange and synthesise knowledge from many different sources. Whilst academic research has focused on the antecedents of innovation, there is very little work on the potential impact of gender on the innovation agenda. In this research we take a closer look at the role - if any - that gender plays in innovative teams, and make some recommendations about how companies can build and enhance their innovative capacity through team gender composition.

It also published several working papers, such as...

- Gender and the MBA
- The Discursive Construction of Gender in Contemporary Management Literature
- 'I Don't Know Why' – Accounting for the Scarcity of Women in ICT Work
- Narrating Gender: A Discourse Analytic View on Studying Gender
- Gender Fatigue - The Ideological Dilemma of Gender Discrimination in Organisations
- Women Leading Teams

In 2008, the Centre has launched a consortium-backed major research project on generational and gender transformations, led by Elisabeth Kelan, called Gen(d)eration Y: Age diversity is at the top of the agenda for many HR professionals, and responding to generational changes is a crucial issue for attracting and retaining the best talent. Much has been written about Generations X and Y but there is no universally accepted definition of who belongs to which generation. Put simply, Gen Y refers to those under 30 while Gen X includes people over 30. While the generation game is a popular topic in the media, there is a lack of academic research exploring this area. The proposed Gen(d)eration Y attempts to change this gap. The first phase of the project looks at what has been written on Gen Y and young professionals both from an academic and a practitioner perspective and compared this with assumptions about Gen X. The research includes in-depth interviews with young professionals.

== Lehman Collapse ==
After the collapse of Lehman Brothers on September 15, 2008, questions were raised about the future existence of the centre. According to media reports, Lehman Brothers had committed £1.75m over five years from 2006 to 2011 toward establishing the centre. London Business School stated vis-à-vis Emiliya Mychasuk and Emiko Terazono's Financial Times People column that "...it was "business as usual"..." and that "...the name of the centre would be unchanged for "the time being"....". Since the Nomura purchase of some Lehman Brothers assets the Centre is known as "The Centre for Women in Business at London Business School".
