= Private-collective model of innovation =

The term private-collective model of innovation was coined by Eric von Hippel and Georg von Krogh in their 2003 publication in Organization Science. This innovation model represents a combination of the private investment model and the collective-action innovation model.

In the private investment model innovators appropriate financial returns from innovations through intellectual property rights such as patents, copyright, licenses, or trade secrets. Any knowledge spillover reduces the innovator's benefits, thus freely revealed knowledge is not in the interest of the innovator.

The collective-action innovation model explains the creation of public goods which are defined by the non-rivalry of benefits and non-excludable access to the good. In this case the innovators do not benefit more than any one else not investing into the public good, thus free-riding occurs. In response to this problem, the cost of innovation has to be distributed, therefore governments typically invest into public goods through public funding.

As combination of these two models, the private-collective model of innovation explains the creation of public goods through private funding. The model is based on the assumption that the innovators privately creating the public goods benefit more than the free-riders only consuming the public good. While the result of the investment is equally available to all, the innovators benefit through the process of creating the public good. Therefore, private-collective innovation occurs when the process-related rewards exceed the process-related costs. This "private-collective model of innovation" has been discussed in relation to "open source innovation".

A laboratory study traced the initiation of private-collective innovation to the first decision to share knowledge in a two-person game with multiple equilibria. The results indicate fragility: when individuals face opportunity costs to sharing their knowledge with others they quickly turn away from the social optimum of mutual sharing. The opportunity costs of the "second player", the second person deciding whether to share, have a bigger (negative) impact on knowledge sharing than the opportunity costs of the first person to decide. Overall, the study also observed sharing behavior in situations where none was predicted.

Recent work shows that a project will not "take off" unless the right incentives are in place for innovators to contribute their knowledge to open innovation from the beginning. The article explores social preferences in the initiation of PCI. It conducted a simulation study that elucidates how inequality aversion, reciprocity, and fairness affect the underlying conditions that lead to the initiation of Private-collective innovation.

While firms increasingly seek to cooperate with outside individuals and organizations to tap into their ideas for new products and services, mechanisms that motivate innovators to "open up" are critical in achieving the benefits of open innovation.

The theory of private collective innovation has recently been extended by a study on the exclusion rights for technology in the competition between private-collective and other innovators. The authors argue that the investment in orphan exclusion rights for technology serves as a subtle coordination mechanism against alternative proprietary solutions.

Additionally, the research on private-collective innovation has been extended with theoretical explanations and empirical evidence of egoism and altruism as significant explanations for cooperation in private-collective innovation. Benbunan-Fich and Koufaris show that contributions to a social bookmarking site are a combination of intentional and unintentional contributions. The intentional public contribution of bookmarks is driven by an egoistic motivation to contribute valuable information and thus showing competence.

== Example: Development of Free and Libre Open Source Software ==
The development of open source software / Free Software (consequently named Free and Libre Open Source Software – FLOSS) is the most prominent example of private-collective innovation. By definition, FLOSS represents a public good. It is non-rival because copying and distributing software does not decrease its value. And it is non-excludable because FLOSS licenses enable everyone to use, change and redistribute the software without any restriction.

While FLOSS is created by many unpaid individuals, it has been shown that technology firms invest substantially in the development of FLOSS. These companies release previously proprietary software under FLOSS licenses, employ programmers to work on established FLOSS projects, and fund entrepreneurial firms to develop certain features. In this way, private entities invest into the creation of public goods.
