= Cary Cooper =

British academic and psychologist (born 1940)

Sir Cary Cooper CBE FAcSS
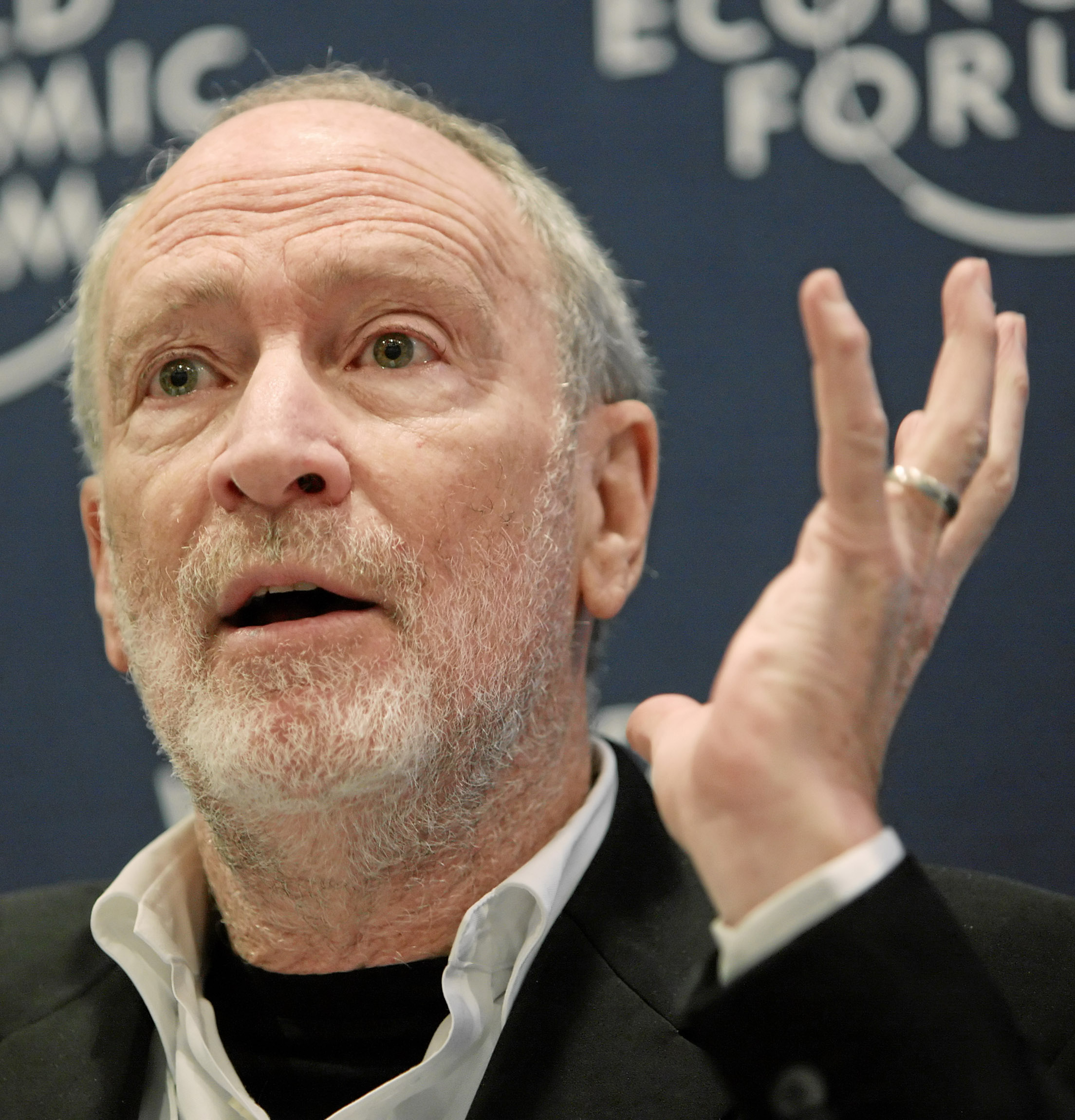
- Cooper at the World Economic Forum's Annual Meeting 2010
- Born: 28 April 1940 (age 86)
- Occupation: Academic
- Known for: Professor of Organizational Psychology and Health at the Manchester Business School

Sir Cary Lynn Cooper (born 28 April 1940), is an American-born British psychologist and 50th Anniversary Professor of Organizational Psychology and Health at the Manchester Business School, University of Manchester.

== Career ==
Before moving to Manchester he was Distinguished Professor at Lancaster University. Cooper was Head of the Manchester School of Management (within UMIST) from the early 1980s. In 1995 he became Pro-Vice-Chancellor and then Deputy Vice-Chancellor of UMIST until 2002. From 1979 to 1980 he was chairman of the Management Education and Development Division of the Academy of Management and was elected as Founding President of the British Academy of Management. In June 2005 he was appointed head of the Sunningdale Institute, which, managed by the United Kingdom National School of Government, brings international academics and industry figures together to advise on issues facing UK public sector organisations. In 2008, Cooper was appointed lead scientist for the UK government's Foresight programme and Report on Mental Capital and Wellbeing. He was chair of the Academy of Social Sciences, a body representing over 88,000 social scientists and 46 learned societies in the social sciences (including the Royal Geographical Society, British Psychological Society, the Political Studies Association, and the Royal Statistical Society). In 2010 he was chair of the Chronic Diseases and Mental Health Global Agenda Council of the World Economic Forum. He is immediate past president of Relate, Clinical Advisor to Anxiety UK, President of the Institute of Welfare, Past President of the Chartered Institute of Personnel and Development 2016–2021, Chair of the National Forum for Health & Wellbeing at Work (2016-) and past president of the British Association for Counselling and Psychotherapy. Cooper was a director of well-being specialists and business psychologists at Robertson Cooper Limited, a university spin off company which he set up in 1999 with Ivan Robertson. He was the founding editor-in-chief of the Journal of Organizational Behavior, founding co-editor of the International Journal of Management Reviews, Editor-in-Chief of the Wiley Blackwell Encyclopedia of Management (12 volumes & now in 3rd Edition), and past editor of the journal Stress and Health. In 2026 Cooper was ranked as number 2 Business & Management Top Scholars in the world by Research.com.

Cooper's parents were Jews from Romania and Ukraine who settled in West Hollywood. He became a British citizen in 1993.

== Education ==
Cooper went to Fairfax High School and then obtained a BSc (UCLA), an M.B.A. (UCLA), and a PhD (Leeds University, UK).

== Queen's Birthday Honours ==
Cooper was appointed Commander of the Order of the British Empire (CBE) by The Queen in the 2001 Birthday Honours for his contribution to occupational/organizational health and was Knighted by the Queen in the 2014 Birthday Honours for services to the social sciences.

== Media work ==
Cooper has been described as the media's first choice for comment on workplace issues, and is often interviewed by the UK press (including BBC and ITV) for both news and current affairs.
