= Nelarine Cornelius =

British academic

Nelarine Estella Cornelius is professor of organisation studies at Queen Mary University of London, England. She was previously professor of organisation studies at the University of Bradford. Cornelius's research relates to the role of business in society, the development of management methods in emerging economies, and questions of social justice.

== Early life ==
She earned her PhD at the University of Manchester.

== Career ==
Cornelius's early career was in management education and change management at General Motors Europe and at the London Borough of Tower Hamlets before she entered academia. She held positions at Brunel University and at the University of Bradford where she was professor of organisation studies. She is currently professor of organisation studies at Queen Mary University of London.

Her research relates to the role of business in society, the development of management methods in emerging economies, and questions of social justice.

She is a fellow of several professional organisations, including the Higher Education Academy, the British Academy of Management, the Royal Society of Arts, the Academy of Social Sciences, and is a member of the Black Female Professors Forum.

She was previously Vice President (Membership and Qualifications) of the Chartered Institute of Personnel and Development and co Vice-Chair (Research and Publications) of the British Academy of Management. She has been a trustee/ director on a number of boards, most recently for National Life Stories, the Oral History Charity, The British Library (https://www.bl.uk/about/projects/national-life-stories) and the Royal College of Art Students Union (https://www.rcasu.org.uk/union/)

Currently, she acts as a senior advisor to the Welsh Government (https://www.gov.wales/anti-racist-wales-action-plan-external-accountability-group) and to Business in the Community (part of the Kings Trust)(https://www.bitc.org.uk/)
