= Alessandro Zattoni =

Alessandro Zattoni is an Italian Professor of Strategy at the Department of Business and Management of the LUISS Business School, born in Forlì, Italy, and based in Rome.

== Career ==
Zattoni was Professor of Management at Parthenope University of Naples, Italy, and Professor of Corporate Governance at Bocconi University, where he was the Director of the Strategic and Entrepreneurial Management Department. He is the Director of the Executive Education Open Program Division of SDA Bocconi School of Management.

== Publications ==
- Zattoni, A. et al. (2017). "Does board independence influence financial performance in IPO firms? The moderating role of the national business system." Journal of World Business.
- Kumar P. and Zattoni A. (2017). "Advancing the Literature on Ownership Structure and Corporate Governance." Corporate Governance: An International Review.
