= Finance Research Letters =

Academic journal

- Discipline: Finance
- Language: English
- Edited by: Laura Ballester, Jonathan Batten, Samuel A. Vigne

Publication details
- History: 2004–present
- Publisher: Elsevier
- Frequency: Bimonthly
- Impact factor: 9.848 (2021)

Standard abbreviations
- ISO 4: Finance Res. Lett.

Indexing
- ISSN: 1544-6123 (print); 1544-6131 (web)
- LCCN: 2003212269
- OCLC no.: 52180748

Links
- Journal homepage; Online archive

Finance Research Letters is a bimonthly peer-reviewed academic journal covering research on all areas of finance that was established in 2004. As a letters journal, the length of manuscripts published is limited to 2,500 words. It is a member of the "Elsevier Finance Ecosystem", a grouping of 10 academic finance journals.

== Reception ==
According to the Journal Citation Reports, the journal has a 2021 impact factor of 9.846, ranking it first out of 111 journals in the category "Business, Finance".

== See also ==
- Journal of Finance
- Journal of Financial Economics
- Review of Financial Studies
