= University of Bath School of Management =

UK Management school in Bath, England

Coordinates: 51°22.6′N 2°19.55′W

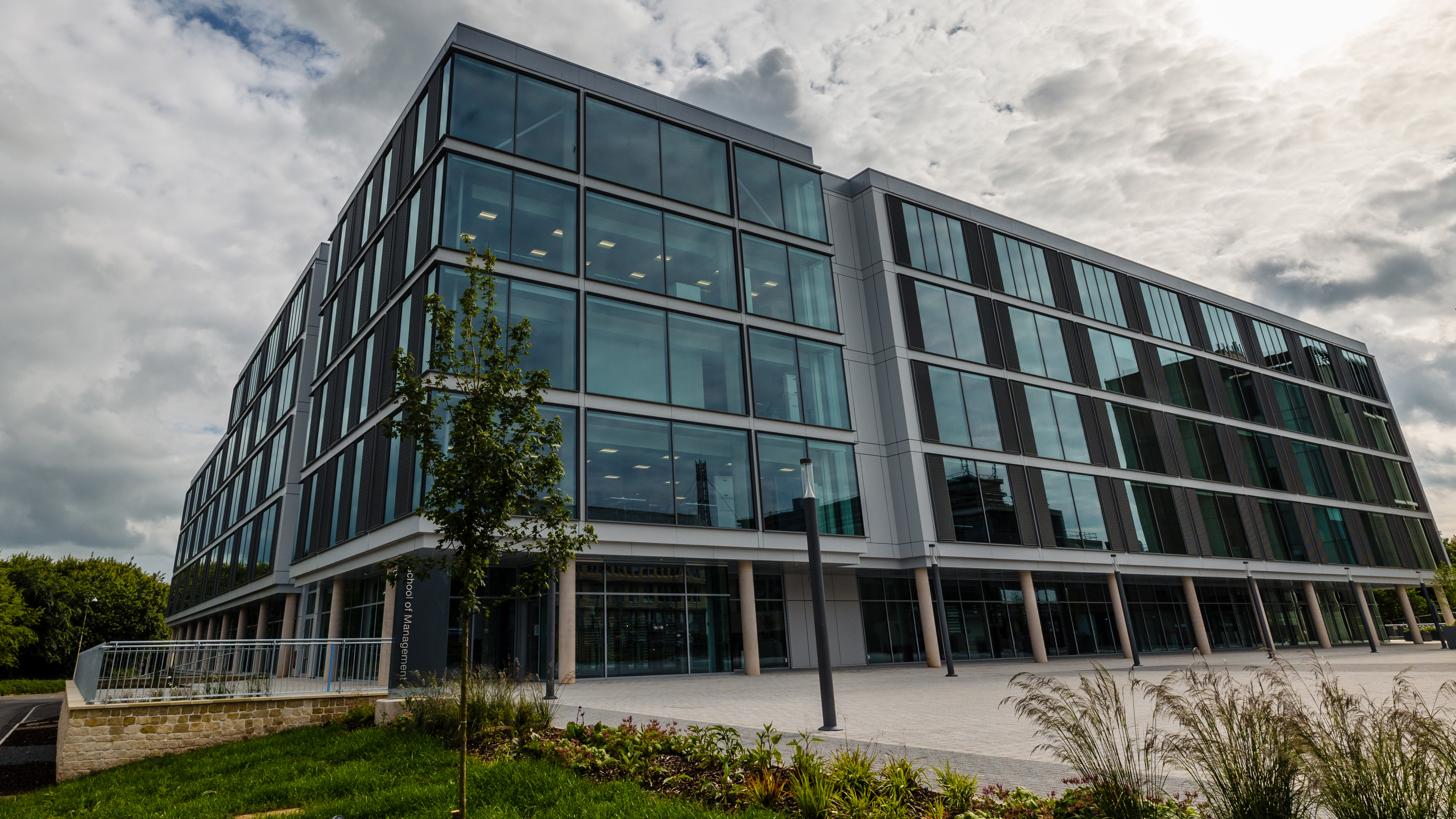
- Type: Business School
- Established: 1966
- Affiliations: University of Bath
- Dean: Steve Brammer
- Location: Bath, United Kingdom
- Campus: Semi-rural
- Website: bath.ac.uk/management

The University of Bath School of Management in Bath, England, is the international business school of the University of Bath. It was established in 1966.

The School offers a range of courses including undergraduate, postgraduate and PhD, as well as executive education for individuals and organisations. The Bath MBA is offered as a one-year full-time programme.

== Accreditation ==
Bath is one of a number of international business schools to have been accredited by EQUIS, the European Foundation for Management Development's (EFMD) quality inspectorate.

== Degree programmes ==
The school offers a range of degrees from undergraduate through to doctoral and post-experience programmes.

There are 11 undergraduate courses, ranging from Accounting and Finance to International Management, and a wide range of Master's courses, including Marketing and Finance with Banking.

=== The Bath MBA ===
The Bath MBA is an intensive programme designed for mature individuals with several years' relevant, postgraduate experience. The programme is available in both full-time and part-time, executive formats. The Bath MBA has been AMBA-accredited since 1976.

=== Doctoral ===
The school offers two research degrees: a PhD, and a specialist Doctor of Business Administration (DBA) in Higher Education Management.

== Reputation ==
The University of Bath currently ranks in the top 10 in the UK for its business-related subjects across the three main national undergraduate rankings (The Times & Sunday Times Good University Guide 2027, The Guardian University Guide 2027 and the Complete University Guide 2027). The Complete University Guide 2027 ranks the University 1st for Marketing, a position it's held since 2017.

In the latest UK government's Research Excellence Framework, 56% of the School's submissions met the 4* standard (the highest possible). According to the Times Higher Education's REF analysis, the School was placed 7th in the UK for business and management studies.

== Faculty ==
The School has over 100 teaching and research staff, with a support team of around 90 managerial and administrative staff. All academic faculty are members of a division and often a research centre.

=== Divisions ===
- Accounting Finance & Law
- Marketing Business & Society
- Information, Decisions & Operations
- Strategy & Organisation

=== Research centres and networks ===
- Centre for Business, Organisations and Society
- Centre for Governance, Regulation and Industrial Strategy
- Centre for Healthcare Innovation and Improvement
- Centre for Research on Entrepreneurship and Innovation
- Centre for Smart Warehousing and Logistics Systems
- Centre for Strategic Change and Leadership
- Future of Work
- Identities in Organisations research centre
- International Centre for Higher Education Management

== Notable alumni ==
- Justin King, CEO, Sainsbury's
- Bob Wigley, Chairman, Merrill Lynch International (Europe, Middle East and Africa)
- Athena Andreadis, musician
- Peter Harrison (businessman), CEO, Schroders
- Russell Senior, ex Pulp guitarist
- Terence Thomas, Baron Thomas of Macclesfield, CBE Former chairman, Northwest Development Agency (1999–2002) and former managing director of the Co-operative Bank
- Ash Atalla, television producer
- Nigel Healey, Vice Chancellor, Fiji National University
- James Shaw, New Zealand minister
- Sir Julian Horn-Smith, former COO of Vodafone
- Stewart Till, Chairman of United International Pictures and Millwall FC
- Stephen Kelly (businessman), former CEO, Sage Group

== See also ==
- University of Bath
- City of Bath
