= European management =

European management is defined as "cross-cultural, societal management based on an interdisciplinary approach" and has three characteristics:

1. A European management approach needs to take into account the various cultures across Europe and how they impact business practice, to pinpoint cultural commonalities and particularities in different organizational environments and management habits.
2. Management principles across Europe have underpinnings which are strongly societal in nature.
3. European managers are required to be highly adaptable due to several different legal, social, political, and economic contexts across Europe. Such adaptability is coupled with the ability to adopt an interdisciplinary approach.

Often European management is contrasted to the American or Japanese management culture. While Americans pursue risk more easily, Europeans rather pursue stability leading to fewer opportunities with fewer financial rewards. The European approach often is considered to be more balanced between economic efficiency and social concerns.
