= Gender, Work and Organization =

Gender, Work & Organization
- Discipline: Women's Studies
- Language: English
- Edited by: Bettina Bastian, Natalia Vershinina, Bronwyn Wood

Publication details
- History: 1994-present
- Publisher: John Wiley & Sons
- Frequency: Bimonthly
- Open access: Hybrid
- Impact factor: 3.101 (2019)

Standard abbreviations
- ISO 4: Gend. Work Organ.

Indexing
- CODEN: GWORF8
- ISSN: 0968-6673 (print); 1468-0432 (web)
- LCCN: sn94030770
- OCLC no.: 37447061

Links
- Journal homepage; Online access; Online archive

Gender, Work & Organization is a bimonthly peer-reviewed academic journal. The journal was established in 1994 and is published by John Wiley & Sons. It covers research on the role of gender on the workfloor. The editors-in-chief are Bettina Bastian, Natalia Vershinina, Bronwyn Wood. In addition to the regular issues, the journal publishes several special issues per year and has new section, Feminist Frontiers, dedicated to contemporary conversations and topics in feminism.

== Abstracting and indexing ==
The journal is abstracted and indexed in:

- ABI/INFORM
- EBSCO databases
- ProQuest databases
- Current Contents/Social & Behavioral Sciences
- Emerald Management Reviews
- Educational Research Abstracts Online
- GEOBASE
- International Bibliography of the Social Sciences
- PsycINFO/Psychological Abstracts
- Scopus
- Social Sciences Citation Index
- Studies on Women and Gender Abstracts

According to the Journal Citation Reports, the journal has a 2019 impact factor of 3.101, ranking it 1/45 of journals in the category "Women's Studies" and 83/226 of journal in the category "Management".

== See also ==
- List of women's studies journals
