= European Management Review =

- Discipline: European management
- Language: English
- Edited by: Professors Anna Grandori and Michael Morley

Publication details
- History: 2004–present
- Publisher: John Wiley & Sons on behalf of the European Academy of Management
- Frequency: Quarterly
- Impact factor: 3.4 (2023)

Standard abbreviations
- ISO 4: Eur. Manag. Rev.

Indexing
- ISSN: 1740-4754 (print); 1740-4762 (web)

Links
- Journal homepage; Online access; Online access

European Management Review is a quarterly peer-reviewed academic journal published by John Wiley & Sons on behalf of the European Academy of Management. The journal covers a broad range of management topics, publishing both empirical and theoretical articles on organization theory, strategic management, corporate governance, human resource management, and managerial economics, focusing on European management issues. Professors Anna Grandori and Michael Morley are the current editors-in-chief of the journal.

== Abstracting and indexing ==
European Management Review is abstracted and indexed by Current Contents/Social & Behavioral Sciences, Social Sciences Citation Index, Scopus, ProQuest databases, and EBSCO databases. According to the Journal Citation Reports, the journal has a 2023 impact factor of 3.4, while in 2022 it ranked 141st out of 227 journals in the category "Management(Social Sciences)".

== EMR Best Paper Award ==
In 2010, the journal established the EMR Best Paper Award, which is sponsored by Wiley, and presented annually to the authors of two papers published in the journal in the preceding year. The winning authors receive €2,000, and a commemorative certificate.
