= British Journal of Management =

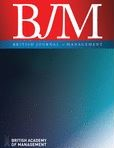
- Discipline: Management studies
- Language: English
- Edited by: Shuang Ren, Soumyadeb Chowdhury

Publication details
- History: 1990–present
- Publisher: Wiley-Blackwell
- Frequency: Quarterly
- Open access: Hybrid
- Impact factor: 6.5 (2025)

Standard abbreviations
- ISO 4: Br. J. Manag.

Indexing
- ISSN: 1467-8551 (print); 1045-3172 (web)
- OCLC no.: 473065347

Links
- Journal homepage; Online access; Online archive

The British Journal of Management is a quarterly peer-reviewed academic journal, which was established by David T. Otley in 1990. It is the official journal of the British Academy of Management and is published by Wiley-Blackwell. The editors-in-chief are Shuang Ren (Queen's University Belfast) and Soumyadeb Chowdhury (TBS Education).

The journal covers "empirical, conceptual and methodological articles across the full range of business and management disciplines". It publishes occasional special issues on a particular theme. The journal does not accept review papers or papers based on surveys of students. Review papers are directed to its sister journal, the International Journal of Management Reviews, also published by the British Academy of Management.

The early history of the journal has been outlined by its second editor-in-chief Gerard P. Hodgkinson.

== Abstracting and indexing ==
The journal is abstracted and indexed in:

- Current Contents/Social and Behavioral Sciences
- EBSCO databases
- Inspec
- ProQuest databases
- PsycINFO
- Scopus
- Social Sciences Citation Index

According to the Journal Citation Reports, the journal has a 2025 impact factor of 6.5.

== Editors ==
The following persons have been editors-in-chief:

- David T. Otley (Lancaster University): 1990–1998
- Gerard P. Hodgkinson (University of Manchester): 1999–2006
- Rolf Van Dick (Goethe University): 2006–2009
- Mustafa Özbilgin (Brunel University of London): 2010–2013
- Geoffrey Wood (Western University): 2014–2019
- Pawan Budhwar (Aston University): 2014–2020
- Douglas Cumming (Florida Atlantic University): 2020–2022
- Riikka Sarala (UNC Greensboro): 2022–2025
- Paul Hibbert (University of St Andrews): 2023–2025
