= International Journal of Management Reviews =

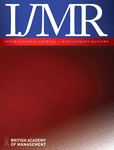
- Discipline: Management studies
- Language: English
- Edited by: Ashish Malik, Alexandra Beauregard and Andrea Caputo

Publication details
- History: 1999–present
- Publisher: Wiley-Blackwell on behalf of the British Academy of Management (United Kingdom)
- Frequency: Quarterly
- Impact factor: 10.8 (2024)

Standard abbreviations
- ISO 4: Int. J. Manag. Rev.

Indexing
- ISSN: 1460-8545 (print); 1468-2370 (web)
- OCLC no.: 609944331

Links
- Journal homepage; Online access; Online archive

The International Journal of Management Reviews is a quarterly peer-reviewed academic journal, established by Cary Cooper in 1999, and published by Wiley-Blackwell on behalf of the British Academy of Management. It is the leading global review journal in organisation and management studies. The current editors are Professor Ashish Malik (UNSW Canberra), Professor Alexandra Beauregard (University of London) and Professor Andrea Caputo (University of Trento). IJMR complements the British Journal of Management, which is also produced by the British Academy of Management.

The journal is known for publishing literature reviews, which are said to play a key role "in shaping the emergence and development of theory within a field of study. Reviews allow the author to take stock of what scholars have done, and then put forward new conceptualizations and directions for future research...". The journal covers all main fields of management studies: from entrepreneurship and organizational behaviour to strategic management and finance. Each issue contains between five and six articles, which examine the relevant academic scholarship published on a specific aspect of a management sub-discipline.

The journal does not accept purely descriptive literature reviews. The stated mission of the journal is for articles "...to make significant conceptual contributions, offering a strategic platform for new directions in research, and making a difference to how scholars might conceptualise research in their respective fields...". In addition to standard journal submissions, the journal publishes articles as part of two special sections: Debate Essays (responses to articles published in the journal) and Methodology (articles addressing innovative methods to undertake literature reviews). Furthermore, at least one special topical issue is guest edited by leading scholars in the field every year.

== Rankings ==
According to the 2024 Journal Citation Reports, the International Journal of Management Reviews has an impact factor of 10.8. In addition, it was rated as an "A" class journal in the "Business and Management" category of the Excellence in Research for Australia rankings.

== Past Co-Editors-in-Chief ==
- Cary L Cooper (founding editor), University of Manchester, UK; 1999–2001
- Alan Pearson (founding editor), University of Manchester, UK; 1999–2001
- Andrew W Stark, University of Manchester, UK; 2002–2004
- Steve Armstrong, University of Lincoln, UK; 2004–2009
- Adrian Wilkinson, Griffith University, Australia; 2004–2009
- Allan Macpherson, University of Wisconsin - La Crosse, US; 2010–2012
- Kamel Mellahi, Dubai Chamber of Commerce and Industry, Dubai; 2013
- Oswald Jones, University of Liverpool, UK; 2010–2016
- Caroline Gatrell, University of Liverpool, UK; 2014–2020
- Katie Bailey, King's College London, UK; 2020–2021
- Dermot Breslin, Rennes School of Business, France; 2017–2022
