= British Academy of Management =

Learned society

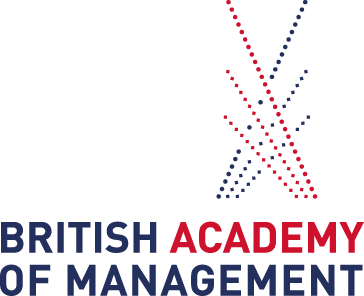
- Abbreviation: BAM
- Formation: 1986; 40 years ago
- Founded at: Warwick, United Kingdom
- Type: Learned society
- Headquarters: Five Kings House, London, England
- Members: Approx. 2000
- President: Katy Mason
- Chair: Emma Parry
- Chief executive officer: Dr Jack Harrington
- Website: bam.ac.uk

The British Academy of Management (BAM) is a British learned society dedicated to advancing the academic discipline of management in the United Kingdom. It is a member of the Academy of Social Sciences.

The academy runs two flagship peer-reviewed academic journals: the British Journal of Management and the International Journal of Management Reviews as well as an annual conference. Its headquarters are in London, United Kingdom.

== History ==
=== Foundation ===
The British Academy of Management was founded in 1986, exactly 50 years after the AoM was formed in Chicago. Sir Cary Cooper was its first President and Andrew Pettigrew was its first chairman. During the AoM conference in San Diego in 1985 they realize the lack of a multidisciplinary association in the UK and decided to establish BAM.

The biggest challenges for this new organisation were to set up a constitution and to exercise good governance through a strong executive committee. The inaugural conference of BAM was at the University of Warwick in 1987. This was organised by Andrew Pettigrew. With over 200 delegates, the conference had an immediate success.

=== Early days ===
From the mid 1980s to the early 1990s, the management of the academy was still based on an amateur approach, because of the moving from one place to another. The nomadic life of the BAM office and the lack of a centralized system meant that outgoing chairpersons packaged the documents and sent them on to the institution of the new chair. Sometimes, this delivery arrived without all the key papers. BAM headquarters had to be moved from one city to another for a bit more than a decade, until they found a stable home in 2002 in London. Thus, the records eventually delivered to HQ were not very comprehensive.

=== Conferences ===
In the 1990s, BAM struggled to find conference venues, and to attract persons due to the fact that the attendance was low. As the time passed there was a growth in both domestic and international attendance, especially from Europe. At this time, it was observed that the conferences were more about social interaction than about the discussion of serious research. Combining both consistently high academic quality and the fun factor became a priority by the late 1990s.

The first BAM Workshop took place on 5 January 1989 entitled ‘Organisation and Strategic Decision Making’ at Bradford Management Centre, University of Bradford. It had 69 participants who came from England, Wales, Scotland, Northern Ireland, Brazil, US, China and France. It was organised by Richard Butler, Richard Pike and John Sharp.

=== First BAM journal ===
BAM's founders wanted to start publishing a journal. Cary Cooper managed one of the AoM divisions that had its own journal and he suggested that BAM should do the same. Cooper coordinated a small group from Council who interviewed a number of publishing companies for a five-year contract, John Wiley won the first contract. The British Journal of Management (BJM) was launched in early 1990 and had 4 issues a year running into 64 pages. The General Editor was David Otley and the Associate Editors were John Burgoyne, John McGee, Roy Payne, Nigel Piercy and Roy Rothwell. BJM purpose was to receive articles from a full range of business and management disciplines and to have a multi and inter disciplinary orientation.

=== Formation of special interest groups ===
One of the significant changes to BAM's structure happened in 1999 with the formation of Special Interest Groups (SIGs). The aim of the SIGs was to encourage greater member participation and to provide a more diverse range of activities for members. The first SIGs were Entrepreneurship and Innovation and Management Consultancy but Learning and Knowledge, Interorganisational Relations, Performance Management, Philosophy of Management, Research Methodology, Creativity and Creative Industries and E-Business soon joined them. The SIG structure proved a thriving way to organise BAM's conferences, offering richer benefits for the membership. SIGs also provided new opportunities for less experienced academics to play active roles in the academy. There are now 23 SIGs representing the full field of management studies.

=== International Journal of Management Reviews ===
The success of the British Journal of Management (BJM) was joined by BAM's acquisition of the International Journal of Management Reviews (IJMR). Cary Cooper and Alan Pearson had been the first editors.

== Governance ==
The British Academy of Management has an executive committee and a Council. It is a Registered Charity (no. 1117999) and is a Company (no. 05869337) Limited by Guarantee and registered in England and Wales.

=== BAM Executive ===
An executive committee, is elected to develop the strategy, work with Council and ensure an effective implementation of the chosen strategy. In 2014 the leadership team was remodelled. This consist of a President, a chair, five elected vice-chair portfolios and an appointed Treasurer. In January 2018 BAM's first CEO, Madeleine Barrows, was appointed to work with the Executive to develop and implement strategy and to lead the office team.

- President: Professor Nic Beech
- Chair: Professor Katy Mason
- Treasurer: Dr Neil Pyper
- Vice Chairs:
  - Equality, Diversity and Inclusivity: Professor Martyna Śliwa
  - Research and Publications: Professor Emma Bell, Professor Nelarine Cornelius
  - Academic Affairs of Conference and Capacity Building: Professor Nicholas O'Regan, Professor Helen Shipton
  - Special Interest Groups: Professor Maureen Meadows, Professor Savvas Papagiannidis
  - Management Knowledge and Education: Professor Lisa Anderson, Professor Mark Loon

=== BAM Council ===
The council, which comprises approximately 50 people elected for a minimum of 3 years by the general membership, or co-opted by the Executive, represents the interests of the membership and contributes to the activities of the learned society through working with the Vice-Chairs. The role of Council is to elaborate strategy and policy, and to implement strategy in conjunction with the Executive and Academy office.

== Special interest groups ==
Special interest groups (SIGs) are networks of researchers that are focused in a specific area of management research. They organize events throughout the year and provide the members with an academic forum for the discussion on relevant topics.

SIGs are run by BAM members, with support from the BAM office. They organise workshop and events on topics relevant to their research area, and take the lead in managing the academic programme at the annual BAM Conference.

Here are the 23 SIG networks:

- Corporate Governance
- Cultural and Creative Industries
- e-Business and e-Government
- Entrepreneurship
- Financial Management
- Gender in Management
- Human Resource Management
- Identity
- Innovation
- Inter-Organizational Collaboration: partnerships, alliances and networks
- International Business and International Management
- Knowledge and Learning
- Leadership and Leadership Development
- Management and Business History
- Marketing and Retail
- Operations, Logistics and Supply Chain Management
- Organisational Psychology
- Organisational Transformation, Change and Development
- Performance Management
- Research Methodology
- Strategy
- Sustainable and Responsible Business

== Annual conference ==
The British Academy of Management (BAM) Conference is for business and management scholars.

No.	Year	Location	Theme
24th	2010	University of Sheffield	Management Research in a Changing Climate
25th	2011	Aston University	Building and Sustaining High Performance Organisations in a Challenging Environment
26th	2012	Cardiff University	Management Research Revisited: Prospects for Theory and Practice
27th	2013	University of Liverpool	Managing to Make a Difference
28th	2014	Ulster University	The Role of the Business School in Supporting Economic and Social Development
29th	2015	University of Portsmouth	The Value of Pluralism in Advancing Management Research, Education and Practice
30th	2016	Newcastle University	Thriving in Turbulent Times
31st	2017	Warwick University	Re-connecting management research with the disciplines: Shaping the research agenda for the social sciences
32nd	2018	University of the West of England	Driving Productivity in Uncertain and Challenging Times
33rd	2019	Aston University	Building and Sustaining High Performance Organisations in Uncertain Times: Challenges and Opportunities. This Conference, the 33rd, was attended by over 950 delegates from 53 countries.
34th	2020	Conference in the Cloud (virtual)	Innovating for a Sustainable Future, held virtually owing to the global coronavirus pandemic
35th	2021	Lancaster University (Virtual)	Recovering from Covid: Responsible Management and Reshaping the Economy, held virtually owing to the global coronavirus pandemic

== Journals ==
=== British Journal of Management ===
The British Journal of Management (BJM) is the official journal of the British Academy of Management. It is published four times a year (plus an annual supplement), welcoming papers that make inter-disciplinary or multi-disciplinary contributions, as well as research from within the traditional disciplines and managerial functions.

BJM has a 2021 impact factor of 7.450, ranked 41 out of 154 in the Business category and 48 out of 228 in the Management category.

The current Editors-in-Chief are Riikka Sarala of UNC Greensboro, United States, Shuang Ren of Queen's University Belfast, United Kingdom, and Paul Hibbert of University of Warwick, United Kingdom.

=== International Journal of Management Reviews ===
The International Journal of Management Reviews (IJMR) is the official journal of the British Academy of Management. It is published four times a year . The journal includes all main subjects of management sub-discipline - from accounting and entrepreneurship to strategy and technology management. Each issue is composed of five or six review articles which examine all the relevant literature published on a specific aspect of the sub-discipline.

IJMR has a 2019 impact factor of 8.631, ranked 5th out of 226 in the Management category and 5th out of 152 in the Business category.

The Co-Editors in Chief of the International Journal of Management Reviews are Dr Dermot Breslin (University of Sheffield), Professor Jamie Callahan (Northumbria University), Dr Marian Iszatt-White (Lancaster University), with Professor Catherine Bailey (King's College London).

== Associated organisations ==
- Academy of Social Sciences (ACSS)
- Chartered Association of Business Schools (CABS)
- Australian and New Zealand Academy of Management (ANZAM)
- Academy of Management (AoM)
- British Academy
- British Library
- Chartered Institute of Marketing (CIM)
- Chartered Institute of Personnel and Development (CIPD)
- Chartered Management Institute (CMI)
- Economic and Social Research Council (ESRC)
- European Academy of Management (EURAM)
- Higher Education Academy (HEA)
- Indian Academy of Management (INDAM)
- Irish Academy of Management (IAM)
- Institute of Small Business and Entrepreneurship (ISBE)
- The Society for the Advancement of Management Studies (SAMS)
- Società Italiana di Management (SIMA)
