= European Academy of Management =

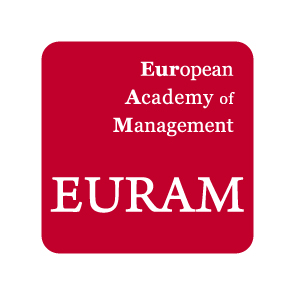
- Formation: 2001
- Founded at: Brussels
- Type: Learned society
- Purpose: EURAM "aims at advancing the academic discipline of management in Europe"
- Headquarters: Brussels, Belgium
- Location: Passage du Nord 19, 1000, Brussels
- Members: approx. ~2000
- President: Professor Alessandro Zattoni
- Website: euram.academy

The European Academy of Management (EURAM), founded in 2001, is a learned society dedicated to the advancement of the academic discipline of management in the Europe. It is a member of the European Institute for Advanced Studies in Management network. EURAM runs the European Management Review, a quarterly peer-reviewed academic journal published by John Wiley & Sons, annual conferences for business and management scholars, and training programmes for PhD students, Post-Docs, Research Directors, and Business School Executives.

It is an organization associated with the Academy of Management since inception and also with the European Institute for Advanced Studies in Management.

== History ==
The European Academy of Management (EURAM) was founded in 2001 and its head office is in Brussels, Belgium. The first EURAM Annual Conference was titled European Management Research: Trends and Challenges and was hosted by the IESE Business School in Barcelona, Spain. EURAM has continued to develop programs and activities to accompany members throughout their professional career life-cycle. Additional initiatives include the creation of the European Management Review in 2003; the Doctoral Consortium started in 2006; Strategic Interest Groups launched in 2009; the European Directors of Research program started in 2009; and the junior faculty program, the EURAM Early Career Colloquium, launched in 2010.

== Governance structure ==
=== EURAM Board ===
- Chairperson: Niels Noorderhaven, Tilburg University
- President: Professor Alessandro Zattoni, LUISS University

Board Members:

- Professor Niels Noorderhaven, Chairperson
- Professor Alessandro Zattoni, President
- Professor Dorota Dobija, Kozminski University
- Professor Dieter Bögenhold, University of Klagenfurt
- Professor Lucrezia Songini, SDA Bocconi School of Management & Eastern Piedmont University
- Professor Hamid Kazeroony, North-West University, S. Africa
- Professor Anabel Fernandez Mesa, University of Valencia
- Professor Peter McKiernan, University of Strathclyde
- Luisa Jaffé, Executive Officer, ex officio member

== Editors of the European Management Review ==
- Anna Grandori, Bocconi University, Milan, Italy
- Michael Morley, Kemmy Business School, University of Limerick, Ireland

== Special Interest Groups (SIGs) ==
At EURAM, Special Interest Groups are organised networks of researchers focused on a specific subfields of management scholarship. Launched in 2009, SIGs are run by members and organize workshops, seminars, conferences throughout the year. The SIGs also organise dedicated tracks at the annual EURAM conferences.

Currently there are 13 standing SIGs at EURAM:

- Business for Society
- Corporate Governance
- Entrepreneurship
- Family Business Research
- Gender, Race and Diversity in Organisations
- Innovation
- International Management
- Managing Sport
- Organisational Behaviour
- Project Organising
- Public and Non-Profit Management
- Research Methods and Research Practice
- Strategic Management

== Journal ==
European Management Review is a quarterly peer-reviewed academic journal published by John Wiley & Sons on behalf of the European Academy of Management. The journal is abstracted and indexed by Current Contents/Social & Behavioral Sciences, Social Sciences Citation Index, Scopus, ProQuest databases, and EBSCO databases.

According to the Journal Citation Reports, the journal has an increased 2021 impact factor of 3.000, ranking it 165th out of 228 journals in the category "Management". Though thus clearly a third-tier (Q3) journal, the journal remains classified as a second-tier (Q2) journal in the 2021 Chartered Association of Business Schools Academic Journal Guide ranking.
