= Shishi Masaru =

Ukrainian professional sumo wrestler

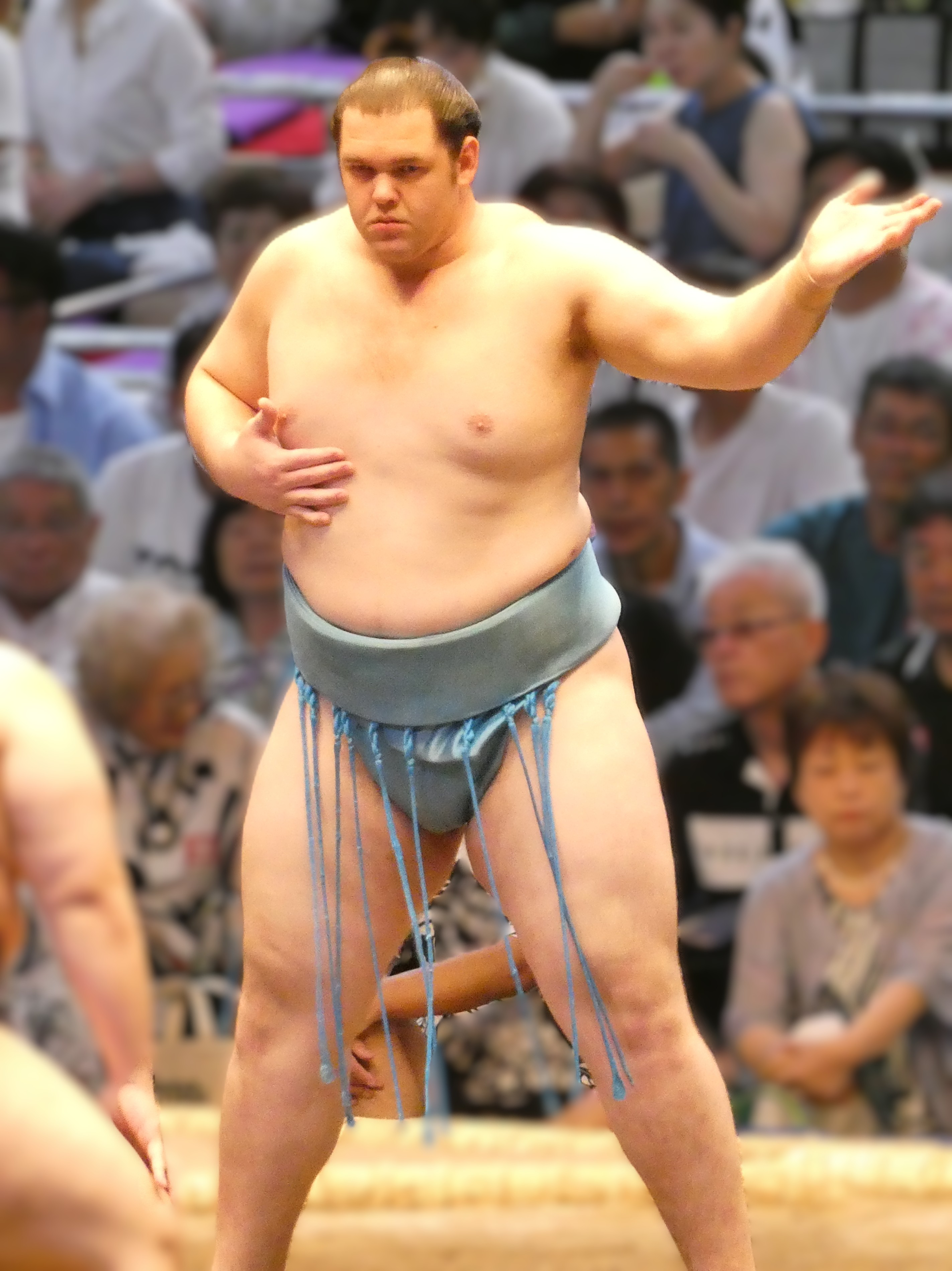

Personal information
- Native name: 獅司 大
- Born: Serhii Sokolovskyi; January 16, 1997 (age 29) Melitopol, Zaporizhzhia Oblast, Ukraine
- Height: 1.92 m (6 ft 3 1/2 in)
- Weight: 182 kg (401 lb; 28.7 st)

Sport
- Sport: Sumo
- Rank: see below
- Heya: Ikazuchi
- Debut: March 2020
- Highest rank: Maegashira 9 (September 2026)
- Championships: 1 (Jūryō)
- Updated on August 31, 2026

Shishi Masaru (Japanese: 獅司 大; born 16 January 1997 as Serhii Sokolovskyi (Ukrainian: Сергій Соколовський)) is a Ukrainian professional sumo wrestler from Melitopol, Zaporizhzhia Oblast. Nicknamed "mini-Baruto", he made his professional debut in January 2020 after a successful amateur career. He became sekitori when he reached the jūryō division in July 2023, and was promoted to the top makuuchi division for the first time in November 2024. He wrestles for Ikazuchi stable, and joined that stable when it was still named Irumagawa.

As of July 2023, he is one of two Ukrainians currently competing in professional sumo. He is the first Ukrainian in the history of the sport to have reached the status of sekitori.

== Early life and sumo background ==
Medal record

Men's Sumo

Representing Ukraine

European Sumo Championships
Gold medal – first place	2012 Budapest, Hungary	100kg
Bronze medal – third place	2016 Krotoszyn, Poland	Over 115kg
Silver medal – second place	2017 Tbilisi, Georgia	Over 115kg

Sumo World Championships
Bronze medal – third place	2016 Ulaanbaatar, Mongolia	Heavyweight
Bronze medal – third place	2016 Ulaanbaatar, Mongolia	Team

Sumo World Cup
Bronze medal – third place	2016 Minsk, Belarus	Heavyweight

US Sumo Open
Bronze medal – third place	2018 Long Beach, California	Heavyweight
Silver medal – second place	2018 Long Beach, California	Openweight

Sokolovskyi started wrestling at the age of 6, and switched to sumo at the age of 15. According to his mother, he always liked to fight and was not afraid of pain, something she attributes to an ancestor on his father's side, who was a strongman and who fought alongside Nestor Makhno. As a child, he played football as a goalkeeper but was scouted by a freestyle wrestling coach who motivated him to join his club. While climbing the weight categories of freestyle wrestling, Sokolovskyi exceeded the sport's maximum weight limit of 125 kg (276 lb) and joined the sumo club. In 2012, he won the European Sumo Championships. Sokolovskyi also competed in the 2015 World Sumo Championships. Although he did not achieve a notable ranking there, he faced Kamatani Masakatsu, who was also competing in the tournament, for the first time. In 2016, he took part in several tournaments, including the European and World Championships, where he finished third in both individual and team competition. In 2018, he took part in the US Sumo Open where he won bronze and silver medals in the Heavyweight and Openweight categories respectively, being only defeated in the Openweight final by the champion, Russian Konstantin Abdula-Zade.

Since he had already decided to become a professional sumo wrestler, he moved to Japan in 2016, after the World Championships to train at Tokitsukaze stable. However, the stable already had a foreign wrestler and could therefore not recruit Shishi. At the invitation of Irumagawa stable, which had also scouted him, he stayed in Japan and was tested to see if he could acclimatize to the life in the stable. After over a year living and training at Irumagawa stable, he finally decided to enroll in 2020, bringing the number of countries with at least one professional sumo wrestler to 24. During his first months of community life, he revealed that he was prone to homesickness and had difficulty overcoming the language barrier (speaking neither English nor Japanese), crying regularly. Nonetheless, he managed to learn a few words of Japanese by mimetism, recalling that he was particularly proud of having managed to order a dish of chankonabe on his own at the restaurant.

== Career ==
=== Early career ===
During the new recruits inspection, Wakafuji-oyakata (former maegashira Ōtsukasa), one of his coaches at Irumagawa stable, said he looked like a "mini-Baruto" because at the time of his apprentice examination he was 1.91 m (6 ft 3 in) and weighed 162 kg (357 lb). He joined at the same time as 2019 high-school yokozuna Genki Ōkuwa, who joined Isegahama stable, Hokuseihō, who joined Miyagino stable, and Hōzan Takamori, the second son of former sekiwake Takatōriki, who joined Ōtake stable; although they never faced each other in their maezumō debut. He was given the shikona, or ring name, Shishi (獅司), from the kanji for 'lion' (獅), to evoke the hopes of his master that he will "become the king of beasts", and the kanji meaning 'to govern' (司), in deference to former coach and stable owner, the former sekiwake Tochitsukasa.

Since the beginning of the Russian invasion of Ukraine, Shishi has been regularly asked about the fate of his family, who stayed in the country. However, since the Japan Sumo Association forbids political comments to its wrestlers, he has always dodged the subject, limiting himself to simple comments on his communications with his parents and their view of his performances and refusing to comment on Ukrainian president Volodymyr Zelenskyy's visit in Japan in May 2023. Furthermore, since the beginning of the invasion, he has received a great deal of acclaim from the public, even when he was in makushita, a division where the public is not normally as enthusiastic.

On 26 January 2023, it was announced that Irumagawa-oyakata (former sekiwake Tochitsukasa), in anticipation of his mandatory retirement in April, would give control of his stable to coach Ikazuchi (former komusubi Kakizoe), without him inheriting the Irumagawa elder name. During this change, Shishi received encouragement from his new stablemaster, who told him he had "the potential to become a star".

During the May 2023 tournament, Shishi was in a position of potential promotion to the jūryō division. He first secured a kachi-koshi record over Yūma on Day 4, and went to earn a sixth victory with a win over upper-division wrestler Tokihayate, conceding just one defeat in his sixth match to eventual tournament winner Kiryūkō (Tatsunami stable). He finished the tournament with a score of 6–1 and was logically promoted to sumo's second highest division, jūryō, alongside Kihō and Yūma. This promotion makes Shishi the first Ukrainian wrestler in sumo history to achieve sekitori status, although sumo has also welcomed other wrestlers of Ukrainian descent, including the no less famous yokozuna Taihō, whose father was a Ukrainian from Kharkiv who fled the Russian revolution. At the press conference to mark his promotion to the rank of jūryō, he expressed his reservations about the situation in his home country, but vowed to offer his parents, who remained in Ukraine, the material and financial assistance they needed from then on. At the time of his promotion, Shishi received his shimekomi from his former master (former sekiwake Tochitsukasa) and was presented with a keshō-mawashi by the supporters' association of Izumisano (Osaka Prefecture). The all-white and gold keshō-mawashi bears the inscription Kishin (鬼心), meaning 'demon's heart', at the request of master Ikazuchi to inspire his wrestler to fight with demonic fervor. On the thirteenth day of the July tournament, Shishi achieved a kachi-koshi record by defeating Tamashōhō, thus securing his presence in the jūryō division.

Shishi continued his progress in the jūryō division by recording another good score at the September tournament. During the November tournament, he had a notable match against Hitoshi on day eleven, during which he broke his front teeth during the tachi-ai. Shishi had, however, recorded an eighth defeat the day before against the eventual winner of that month's tournament, Kotoshōhō. He finally worsened his score on the thirteenth day, in his match against Kagayaki, finishing the tournament with a score of 6–9.

=== Makuuchi ===
Remaining in jūryō at the start of 2024, Shishi scored 11 wins at the July tournament. He followed it up with a nine-win effort in September at the rank of jūryō 2. He was promoted to maegashira for the November 2024 tournament, becoming the first professional sumo wrestler from Ukraine to reach the top division. He also became the first wrestler for Ikazuchi stable since reopening in 2023 to reach makuuchi. Shishi told reporters after his promotion that he was happy to reach the top division, noting that he spent more time in makushita than he did in jūryō. "One year in jūryō is fast... I thought it would take a little longer," he said. Stablemaster Ikazuchi told reporters his wish for Shishi to have the chance to reach the san'yaku ranks (above maegashira). Since makuuchi wrestlers who win their bouts are eligible for bonuses if their match was sponsored, Shishi mentioned to the press his intention to send the money to his family back in Ukraine.

Despite starting the first two days with victories, Shishi recorded a make-koshi score on the eleventh day of the tournament, when he suffered defeat against Nishikifuji. Demoted to the jūryō division, Shishi established himself as one of the leaders of the competition, rivalled also by Aonishiki, the only other Ukrainian wrestler in professional sumo. During the tournament, Shishi recorded a victory on Day 11 over Wakaikari, beating him by yorikiri, and on the same day received a comment from the former Asashōryū on his X account (formerly Twitter) encouraging him to change his sumo style, the former yokozuna considering it dangerous and likely to injure Shishi. On Day 12, Shishi and Aonishiki faced off in the first match between two Ukrainian wrestlers in the history of the sport, with Shishi emerging victorious from the clash and taking sole leadership of the competition. Shishi won the championship, solidifying his chances of being promoted back to makuuchi for the March tournament. When his victory was certain, Shishi inspired Hiroyuki Sato (then in the NHK commentator's booth) with his own catchphrase of ureshishi (うれシシ), a pun on his ring name and ureshī (うれしい), meaning "to be happy".

When the banzuke of the 2025 March tournament was released, it was confirmed that Shishi was promoted back to the top division. Coinciding with his promotion, his compatriot Aonishiki's maiden top division promotion also made their country, Ukraine, the seventh foreign country to have two makuuchi-ranked wrestlers in the history of professional sumo.

During the September tournament, Shishi was the first wrestler to win a match in front of Prince Edward, Duke of Edinburgh, and his wife Duchess Sophie who were attendance at the tournament during the makuuchi division.

During the May 2026 tournament, Shishi received a formal warning from the Judging Department for pushing Asahakuryū out of the ring after the outcome of the match had already been decided. During the same tournament, his victory, achieved by a side-step, against fan favorite Tamawashi—who was injured and facing relegation to the jūryō division due to a negative record—led to a social media harassment campaign calling for him to return to his home country. These two incidents prompted his stablemaster, Ikazuchi (former komusubi Kakizoe), to reveal that the dodge was due to an injury Shishi had sustained, and that he had wrestled the entire tournament while on painkillers. In addition, the press reported on Asahakuryū's lack of cooperation following his defeat, which reportedly led to him accidentally stepping out of the ring after the bout had ended.

During the July 2026 tournament, Shishi performed well, advancing to the ninth day, with only one loss, among the wrestlers competing for the title. Until Day 13, he continued to hold his own in the leading group, though he suffered a loss to ōzeki Kotozakura. This match marked the first time the two wrestlers had faced each other professionally and the first time Shishi had faced an ōzeki. Shishi dropped out of the title race when he was defeated by Atamifuji on Day 14. Before the final day of the tournament, it was announced that Shishi could win his very first special prize for Fighting Spirit if he won his last match. Shishi lost to Rōga and did not win the award.

During the November 2026 tournament, Shishi registered 10 defeats before stepping out from the tournament due to complications from heterotopic ossification of his left acromioclavicular joint, a situation that had already forced him to withdraw from the fall tour.

== Fighting style ==
Shishi's most common kimarite, or winning technique, is yori-kiri ('force out'), and he prefers a migi-yotsu, or left hand outside, right hand inside grip on his opponent's mawashi. However, it was noted that he could also be versatile, winning a not inconsiderable number of matches by oshi-dashi ('push out') and uwatenage ('overarm throw'). In the early years of his professional career he admitted that he wanted to emulate the style of former ōzeki Tochinoshin, who is his favourite wrestler. Shishi also watches former ōzeki Baruto's matches to perfect his sumo style.

== Personal life ==
Shishi speaks Ukrainian and Russian. He however defines Russian as his main native language. Although most of Shishi's family remains in Ukraine, they are split between Ukraine and Japan. His parents and grandmother remained in the Zaporizhzhia Oblast, and his younger brother was moved as a refugee to Saitama Prefecture.

After moving to Japan in 2018, Shishi initially had difficulty speaking Japanese. Since his promotion to jūryō, this problem had become more of a hassle as sekitori respond more to interviews. To compensate for his level of Japanese, Shishi relied on his tsukebito (assistant) and stablemate, sandanme-ranked wrestler Saidaiji, with whom he converses when in doubt about the meaning of his sentence and who relays the answer to the journalists. The relationship between the assistant and his superior has also attracted the attention of observers, who are amused by this unprecedented situation, even dubbing Saidaiji the "Ippei Mizuhara of the kakukai", in reference to the translator to whom Shohei Ohtani owed a great deal during his interviews. As of 2026, Shishi responds to interviews in Japanese without a translator.

Unusually, Shishi is also trained by his stable's okamisan (the latter being subject to numerous rules within the stables), Eimi, who is a former amateur sumo wrestler who won the Sumo World Championships and was part of Nihon University sumo club. He also trains with his master's son, a student at the prestigious Saitama Sakae High School sumo club. Because of his close relationship with his master's family, Shishi refers to his okamisan as his "mama" and his stable as his Ikazuchi family (雷ファミリー).

== Career record ==
Shishi Masaru
Year	January Hatsu basho, Tokyo	March Haru basho, Osaka	May Natsu basho, Tokyo	July Nagoya basho, Nagoya	September Aki basho, Tokyo	November Kyūshū basho, Fukuoka
2020	x	(Maezumō)	West Jonokuchi #14; Tournament Cancelled; State of Emergency; 0–0–0	West Jonokuchi #14; 6–1	East Jonidan #47; 6–1	West Sandanme #81; 6–1
2021	East Sandanme #23; 6–0–1	West Makushita #44; 4–3	West Makushita #34; 6–1	West Makushita #12; 4–3	East Makushita #8; 1–5–1	East Makushita #31; 4–3
2022	West Makushita #25; 4–3	West Makushita #17; 6–1	East Makushita #7; 3–4	East Makushita #14; 4–3	East Makushita #11; 4–3	West Makushita #7; 1–6
2023	East Makushita #20; 5–2	East Makushita #12; 6–1	West Makushita #2; 6–1	East Jūryō #12; 9–6	East Jūryō #8; 9–6	West Jūryō #5; 6–9
2024	West Jūryō #7; 7–8	West Jūryō #8; 8–7	East Jūryō #7; 5–10	East Jūryō #10; 11–4	West Jūryō #2; 9–6	East Maegashira #16; 5–10
2025	West Jūryō #4; 13–2; Champion	West Maegashira #13; 9–6	West Maegashira #11; 4–11	West Maegashira #17; 7–8	East Maegashira #18; 10–5	East Maegashira #11; 6–9
2026	East Maegashira #14; 9–6	East Maegashira #11; 6–9	East Maegashira #12; 6–9	West Maegashira #14; 10–5	West Maegashira #9; 7–8	East Maegashira #10; 0–11–4
Record given as wins–losses–absences Top division champion Top division runner-up Retired Non-participation Jūryō Lower divisions Sanshō key: F=Fighting spirit; O=Outstanding performance; T=Technique Also shown: ★=Kinboshi; P=Playoff(s); Divisions: Makuuchi — Jūryō — Makushita — Sandanme — Jonidan — Jonokuchi Makuuchi ranks: Yokozuna — Ōzeki — Sekiwake — Komusubi — Maegashira

== See also ==
- Glossary of sumo terms
- List of active sumo wrestlers
- List of non-Japanese sumo wrestlers
- List of sumo second division champions
