= Referee =

Official in a variety of sports

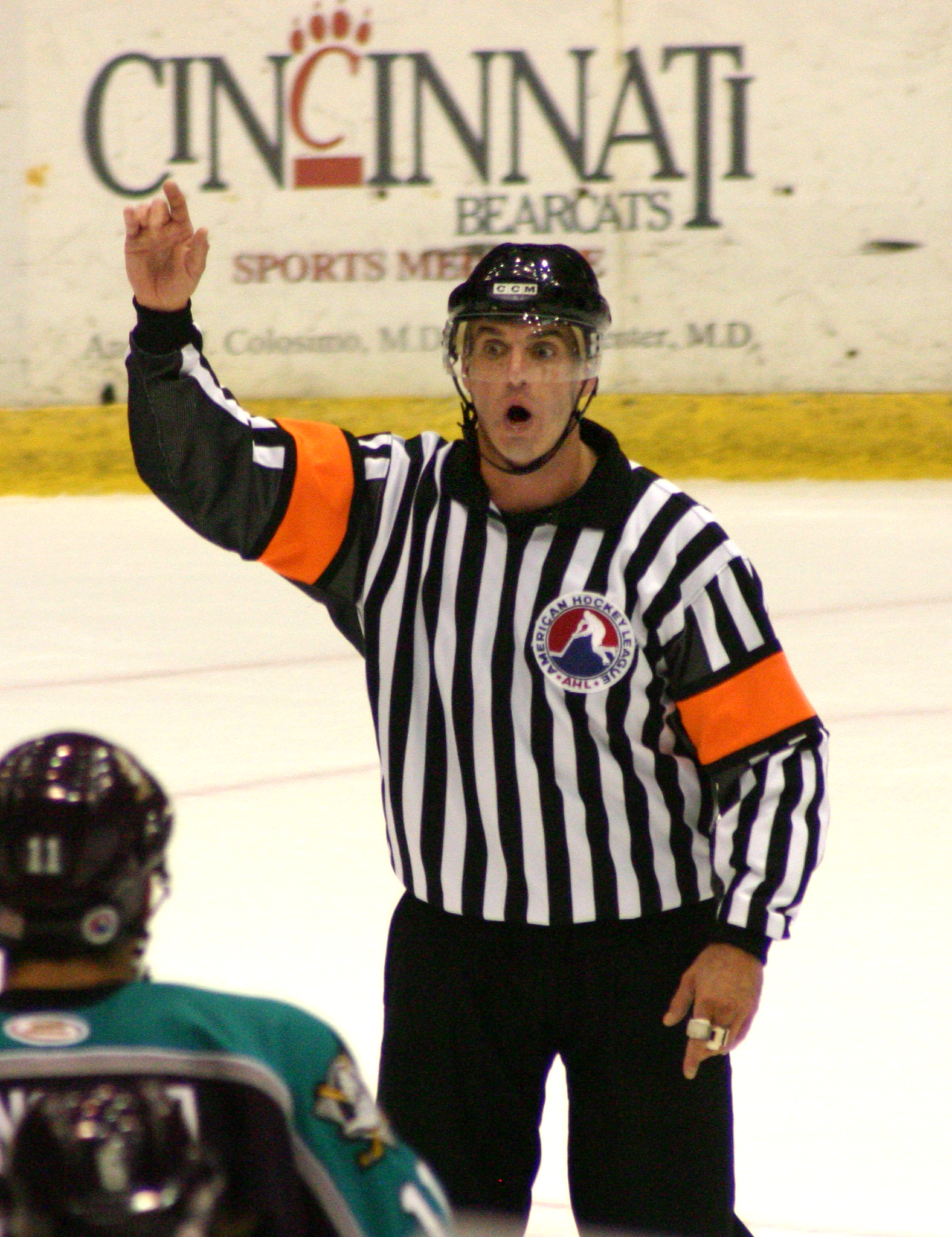
Dean Morton, a referee in the American Hockey League

A referee is an official, in a variety of sports and competition, responsible for enforcing the rules of the sport, including sportsmanship decisions such as ejection. The official tasked with this job may be known by a variety of other titles depending on the sport, including umpire, judge, arbiter, commissaire, or technical official (by the International Olympic Committee). Referees may be assisted by linesmen, timekeepers, touch judges, or video assistant referees (VAR).

== Football (association) ==
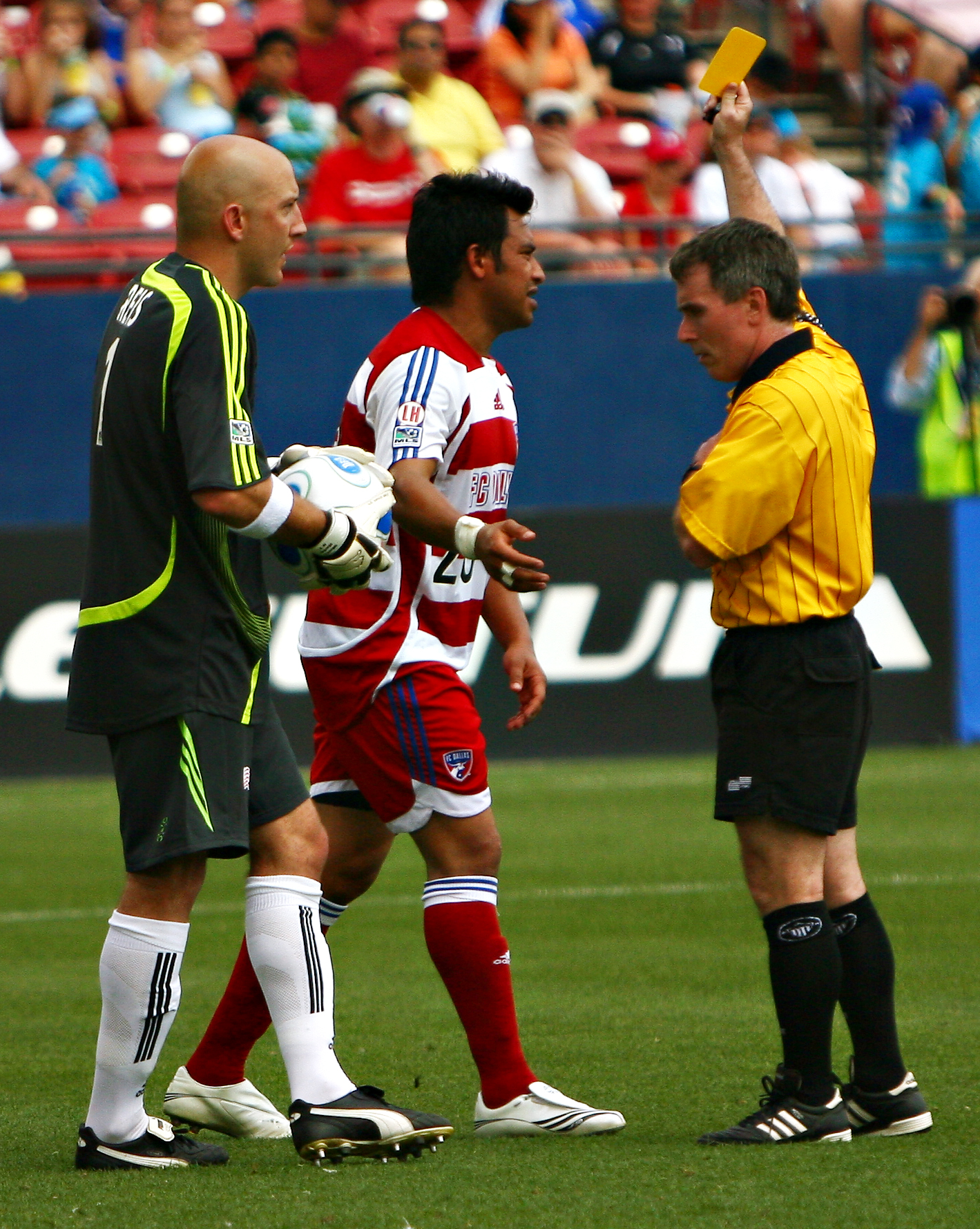
A referee (right) issues a yellow card to a player during a game of association football.

Originally team captains would consult each other in order to resolve any dispute on the pitch. Eventually this role was delegated to an umpire. Each team would bring their own partisan umpire allowing the team captains to concentrate on the game. In 1881, the referee, a third "neutral" official was added; this referee would be "referred to" if the umpires could not resolve a dispute. The referee did not take his place on the pitch until 1891, when the umpires became linesmen (now assistant referees). Today, in many amateur football matches, each side will still supply their own partisan assistant referees (still commonly called club linesmen) to assist the neutral referee appointed by the governing football association if one or both assistant referees are not provided. In this case, the role of the linesmen is limited to indicating out of play and cannot decide off side.

An association football (soccer) match is presided over by a referee, whom the Laws of the Game give "full authority to enforce the Laws of the Game in connection with the match to which he has been appointed" (Law 5). The referee is oftentimes assisted by two assistant referees, and sometimes by a fourth official.

== Football (American and Canadian) ==
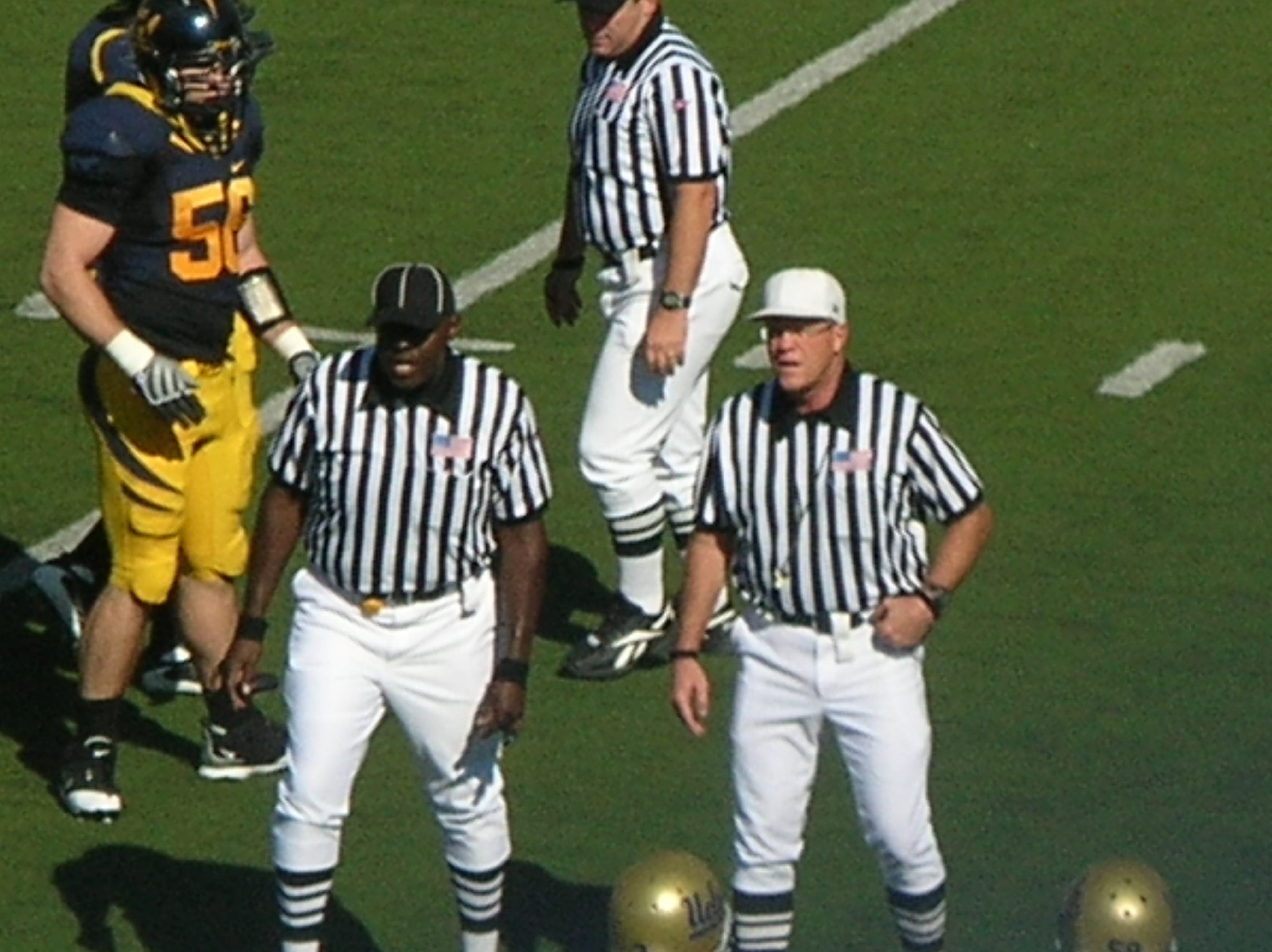
An American football referee (right, in white cap) announces a call. The other officials wear black caps.

An American football (or Canadian football) referee is responsible for the general supervision of the game and has the final authority on all rulings. The referee is assisted by up to six other officials on the field. These officials are commonly referred to as "referees" but each has a title based on position and responsibilities during the game (only one being called referee): referee, head linesman ("down judge" in the NFL), line judge, umpire, back judge, side judge, and field judge. In the modern XFL, an additional "ball judge", who wears a red hat, is on the field, but does not have the power to call penalties. Referees in American football traditionally wear black-and-white vertically striped shirts, a design developed by Dr. Lloyd W. Olds in 1921 to provide contrast from team uniforms and ensure officials stand out on the field.

== Football (Gaelic) ==
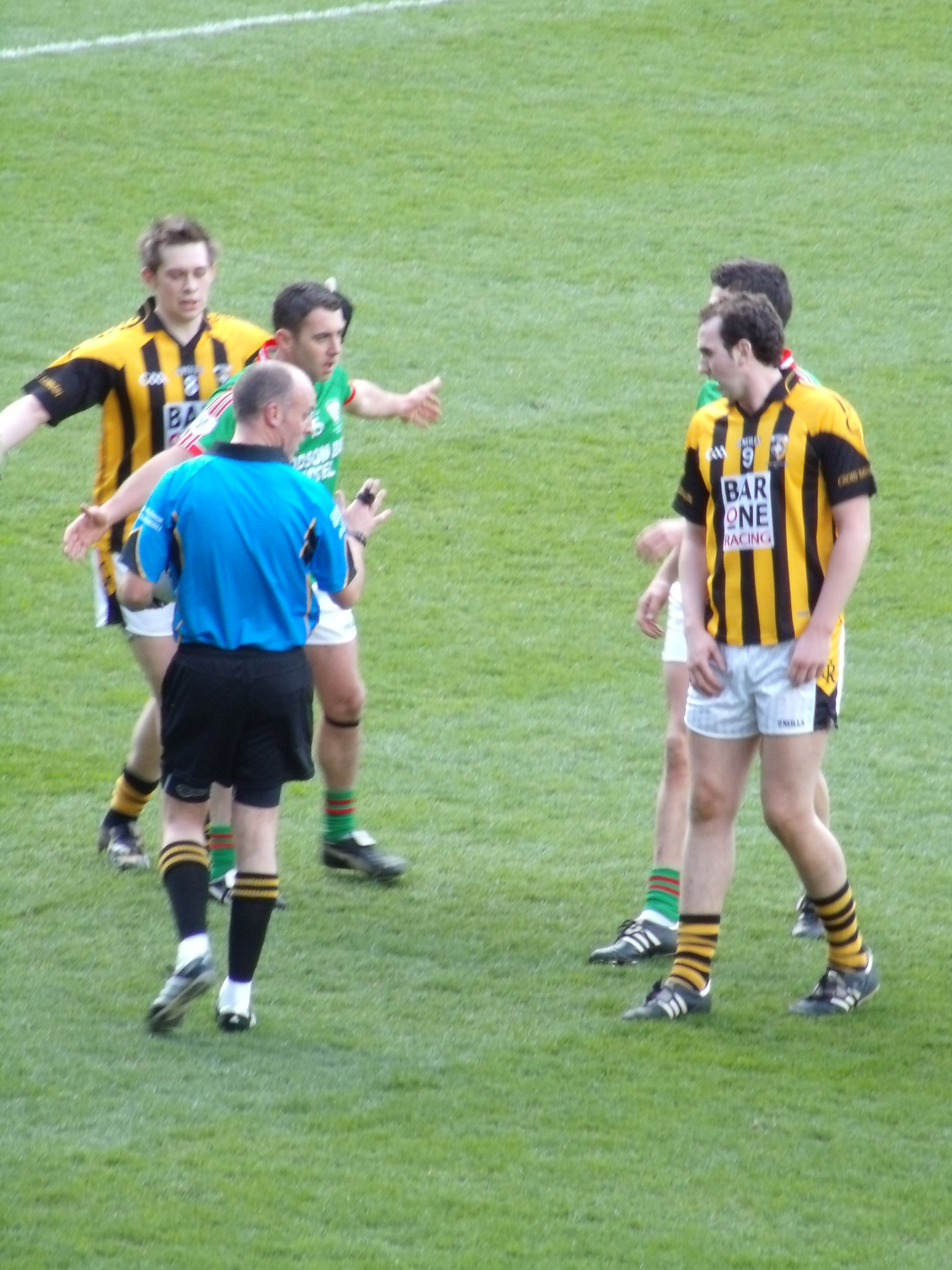
Gaelic football ref in blue

There are usually 7 officials in Gaelic football. A main referee follows the play around the field and has the final authority on decisions such as fouls, throws and card-issuing, un-disputable by players. The main play referee is assisted by two linesmen, who make decisions on who gains possession when the ball goes out of the field of play, and can also advise the referee on off-the-ball events such as a fight or an illegal tackle. As well as the referee and two linesmen, there are two umpires at each end of the field of play who stand on either side of the goal post and raise a white flag for a point, or a green flag for a goal respectively, also calling wides and square-balls. An umpire can also advise the referee on off-the-ball incidents, but does not hold as much authority as a linesman. In recent times, technology called 'Hawk-eye' can be used if both the umpires and referee are unsure of whether a point has been scored or not, though this technology is not widely available.

== Football (Rugby) ==
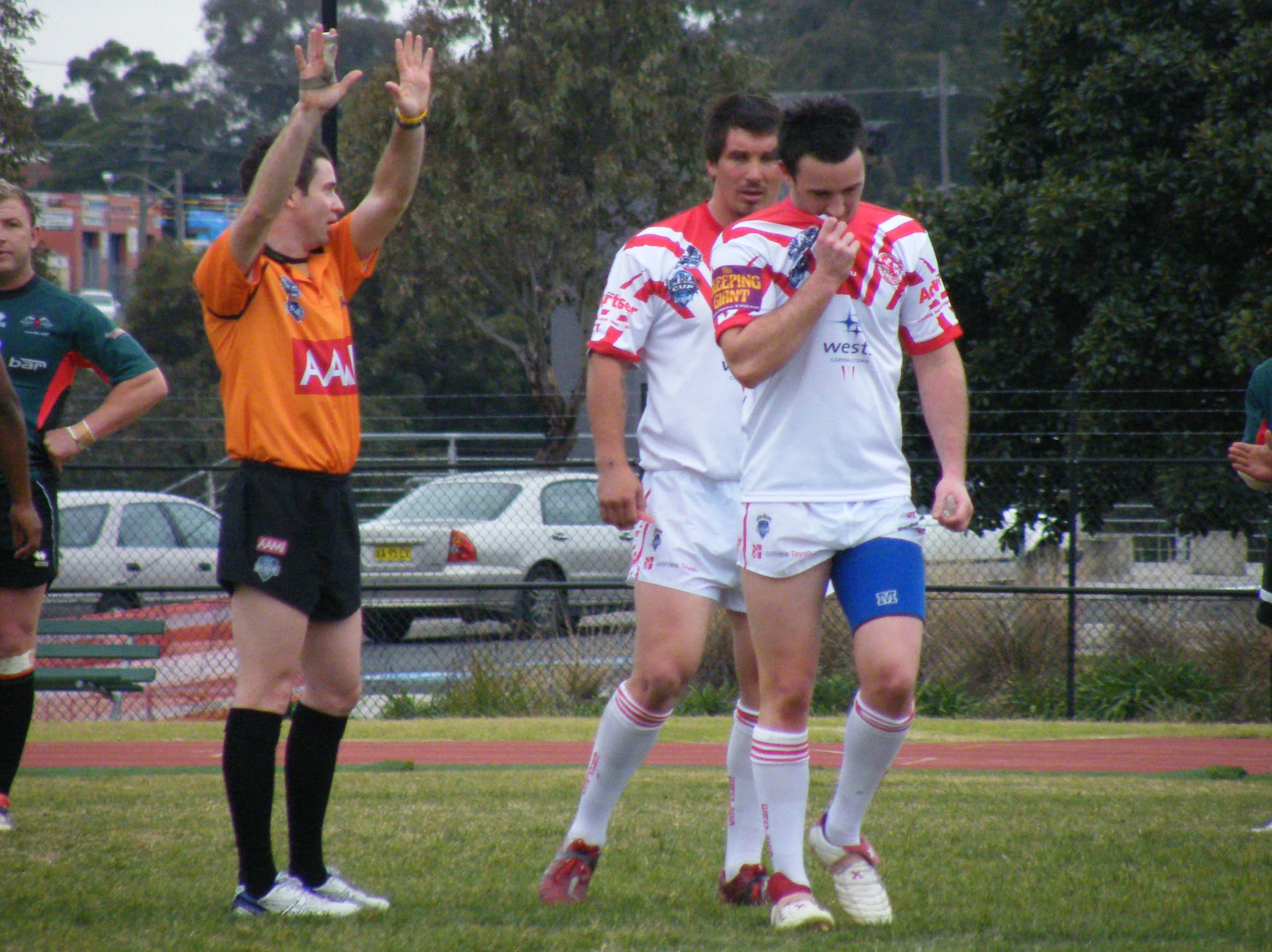
A rugby league referee (left) sending a player to the sin bin for ten minutes

In 1892, the International Rugby Board was created as a result of a disputed try that the captains could not agree on whether it had been scored. The rugby laws were changed to require one referee and two touch judges at each game to make the arbitration easier and more consistent.

== Bandy ==
A game of bandy is officiated by a referee, the authority and enforcer of the rules, whose decisions are final. The referee may be assisted by one or two assistant referees.

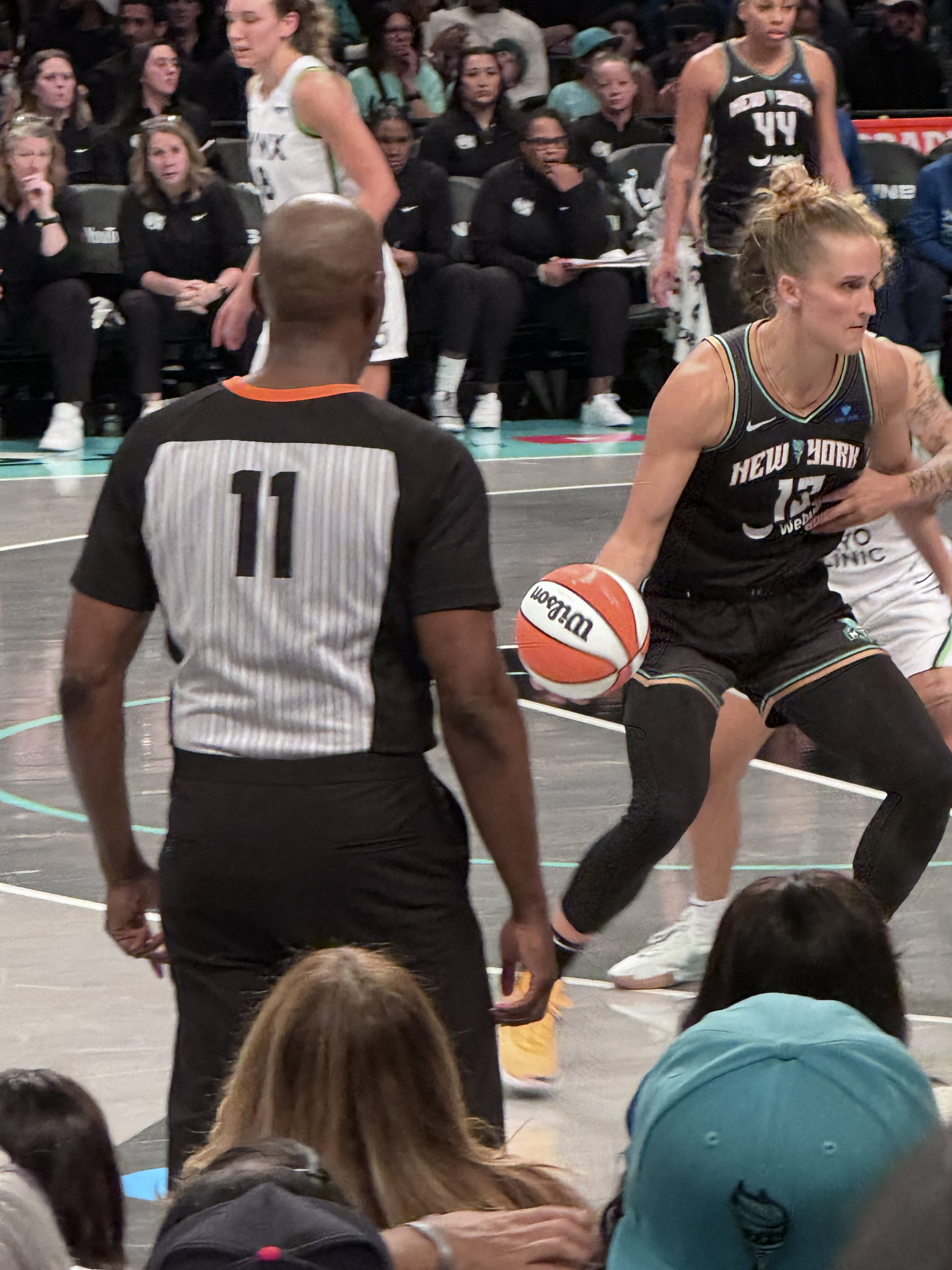
A WNBA official watches the gameplay for rules violations

== Basketball ==
In international basketball and in college basketball, the referee is the lead official in a game, and is assisted by either one or two umpires. In the National Basketball Association, the lead official is referred to by the term crew chief and the two other officials are the referee and umpire. All of the officials in a basketball game are generally accepted to have the same authority as the lead official and therefore they are collectively known as the officials or referees.

== Boxing ==
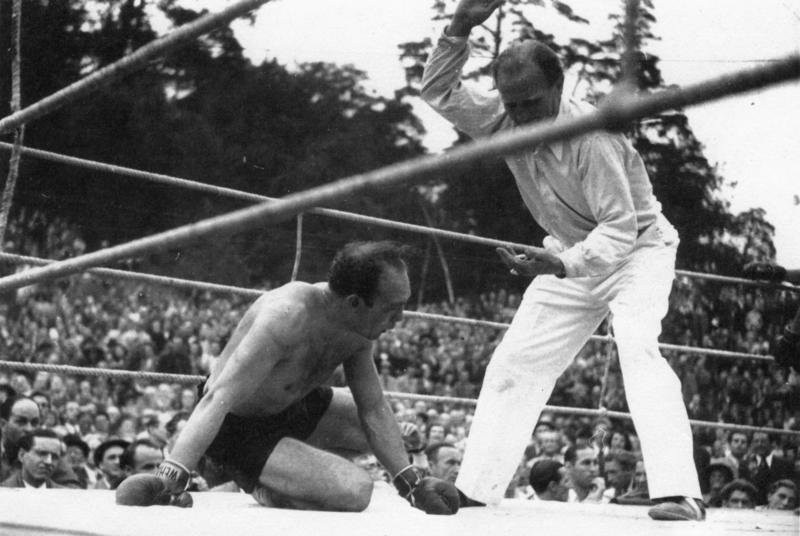
A boxing referee counting a boxer

In boxing a referee is the person who enforces the rules during the fight. He gives instructions to the fighters, starts and stops the count when a competitor is down, and makes the determination to stop a fight when a competitor cannot continue without endangering his health.

== Cue sports ==
In cue sports, such as billiards and snooker, matches are presided over by a referee. The referee will determine all matters of fact relating to the rules, maintain fair playing conditions, call fouls, and take other action as required by these rules.

== Floorball ==
A floorball game is controlled by two referees with equal power.

== Handball ==
According to the International Handball Association, team handball games are officiated by two referees with equal authority who are in charge of each match. They are assisted by a timekeeper and a scorekeeper. In professional competitions, one or more delegates assist the referees by overseeing that rules are followed and the behaviour in the technical area. (Source: International Handball Association, Rules of the Game, 1 August 2005).

== Hurling ==
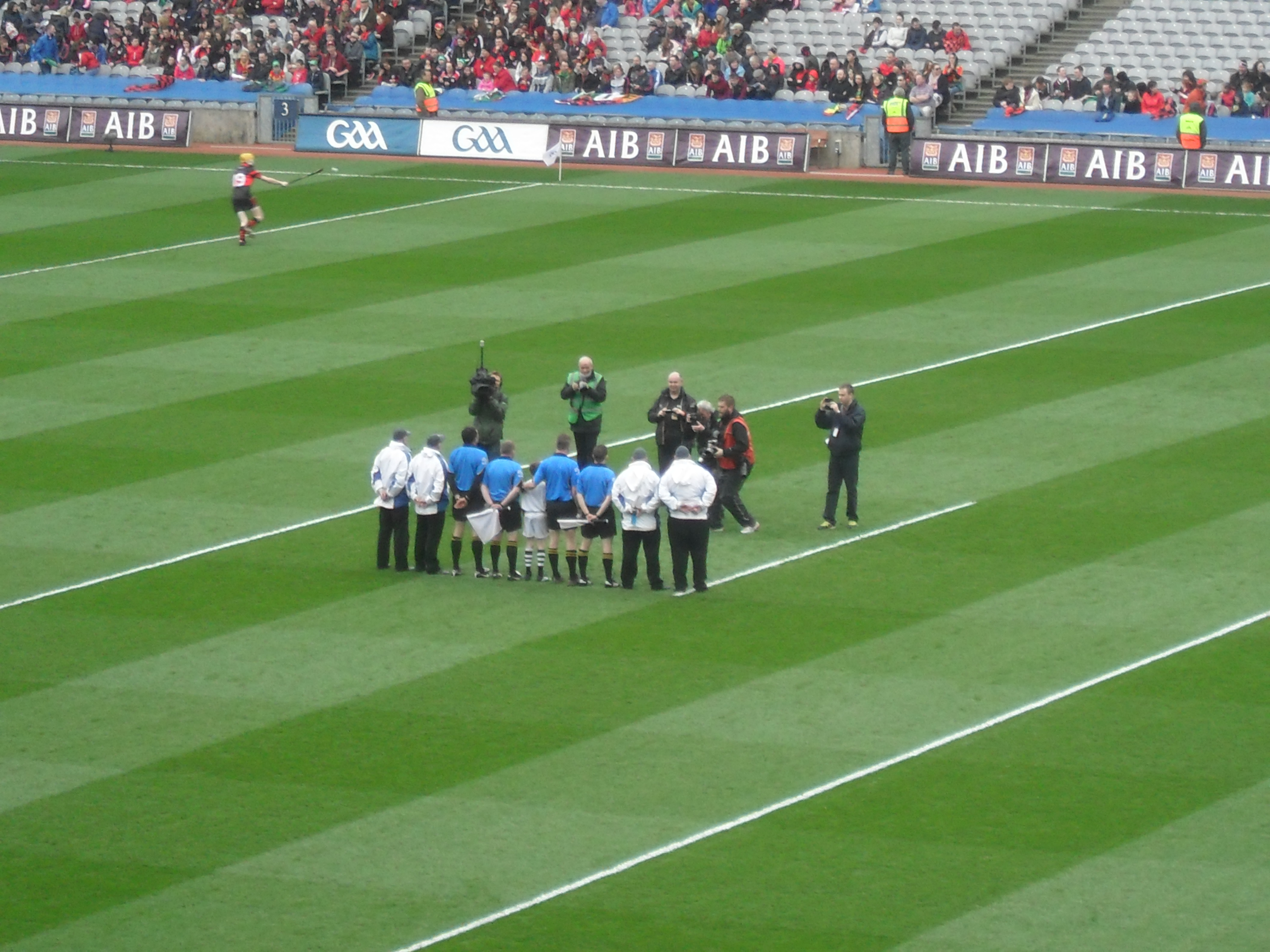
Hurling referee and linesmen in blue shirts, umpires wear white coats

There are usually 7 officials in hurling. A main referee follows the play around the field and has the final authority on decisions such as fouls, throws and card-issuing, un-disputable by players. The main play referee is assisted by two linesmen, who make decisions on who gains possession when the ball goes out of the field of play, and can also advise the referee on off-the-ball events such as a fight or an illegal tackle. As well as the referee and two linesmen, there are two umpires at each end of the field of play who stand on either side of the goal post and raise a white flag for a point, or a green flag for a goal respectively, also calling wides. Any umpire can also advise the referee on off-the-ball incidents, but does not hold as much authority as a linesman. At inter-county senior games and other important matches, an eighth official, the "Sideline Official", receive substitution notes and holds up the number of substituted players and the amount of additional time, similar to a soccer fourth official. In recent times, technology called Hawk-Eye can be used if both the umpires and referee are unsure of whether a point has been scored or not, although this technology is not widely available.

== Ice hockey ==
An ice hockey referee (top right) positions himself to have a clear view of the game action so he can make crucial judgment calls about plays as accurately as possible

Ice hockey games are presided over by on-ice referees, who are generally assisted by on-ice linesmen. The combination of referees and linesmen varies from league to league. Some leagues use the title "assistant referee", giving those officials greater powers to call certain penalties. In addition, off-ice officials administer to specific functions such as goal judge, penalty timekeeper, game timekeeper, statistician, official scorer and, at the highest professional levels, instant replay official.

== Korfball ==
In korfball, it is the referee's responsibility to control the game and its environment, to enforce the rules and to take action against misbehaviour. He is assisted by an assistant referee, who alerts the referee to out balls and fouls and may have other tasks determined by the referee, and where possible by a timekeeper and scorer.

== Lacrosse ==
A lacrosse match is presided over by a crew of either two, three, or in some cases four on-field officials. In two-man crew, a Referee and an Umpire are utilized. In a three-man crew, a Referee, Umpire, and Field Judge are utilized. The Referee shall always have the final ruling on any and all matters. For games of significance a four-man crew can be used which includes a three-man crew plus a Chief Bench Official who has jurisdiction over the bench area including the timekeeper. The professional outdoor league in the United States utilizes four on-field officials in order to be able to better keep up with the increased pace of play.

== Mixed martial arts ==
Rules in mixed martial arts (MMA) bouts are enforced by a referee who can give warnings and disqualifications should the rules be broken. The referee is also in charge of stopping fights when a fighter "cannot intelligently defend himself" in order to prevent him from incurring further damage, as well as making sure that submissions are released following a tapout and to pull fighters off an unconscious opponent. The referee is advised by a doctor and assistant referee who sit ringside.

The primary concern and job of an MMA referee is the safety of the fighters.

== Roller derby ==
The game of roller derby is governed by a team of up to seven skating referees. (Only three are required due to the grass-roots nature of the sport, though the full seven are used whenever possible). The required referees are a head referee, who oversees the running of the entire game and has final say in any disputes, and who doubles as an inside pack referee, following alongside the main pack of skaters from inside the track and issuing and enforcing penalties for fouls or infringements of the rules; and two jammer referees who follow the two point-scoring players known as jammers. Additional referees fill the roles of a second inside pack ref and up to three outside pack refs, who perform similar duties to the inside pack refs, but from the outside of the track, and who rotate active duty in a relay-race style to avoid fatigue caused by the extra speed needed to keep pace with the pack from the outside. Non-skating officials complete the team by recording and communicating points and penalties and ensuring skaters serve their time accordingly. Only the team captains may engage in discussions with the referees by way of the head referee, over calls made. Referees are also responsible for ensuring the skaters are correctly wearing all regulation safety equipment.

== Underwater hockey ==
An Octopush or underwater hockey match is presided over by two or three water referees in the pool, a chief referee on deck, and at least one timekeeper and one scorekeeper. Additional timekeepers can be used to track penalty times in highly contested matches. A tournament referee will arbitrate for chief referees, whilst protests will be adjudicated by at least three independent referees.

== Volleyball ==
A volleyball match is presided over by a first referee, who observes action from a stand, providing a clear view of action above the net and looking down into the court. The second referee, is at floor level on the opposite side of the net—and in front of the scorers' table. They are often referred to informally as the "up referee" and "down referee," respectively. While the first referee watches over actions involving the ball (and thus the attacking team), the second referee usually judges errors committed by the defending team, like touching the net. The first referee assumes a supervisory control over the match at all times while creating a cooperative environment with the second referee, line judges, and scorers. The second referee's duties are multi-faceted and include on-court responsibilities during play, working with the scorers, interacting with coaches and bench personnel, and in some collegiate volleyball competitions, handling challenge reviews.

== Wrestling (amateur) ==
The international styles of amateur wrestling use a three-official system in which a referee conducts the action in the center of the mat while a judge and a mat chairman remain seated and evaluate the action from their stationary vantage points.

Collegiate wrestling uses a single referee in the center of the mat, or a head referee and an assistant.

== Wrestling (professional) ==
In professional wrestling, the referee's on-stage purpose is similar to that of referees in combat sports such as boxing or mixed martial arts. However, in reality referees are participants in executing a match in accordance with its pre-determined outcome as well as any other events that are scripted to take place during the match. They also function as a conduit for communication between the wrestlers and backstage officials during matches.

== Fencing ==
The first regularized fencing competition was held at the inaugural Grand Military Tournament and Assault at Arms in 1880, held at the Royal Agricultural Hall, in Islington in June. The Tournament featured a series of competitions between army officers and soldiers. Each bout was fought for five hits and the foils were pointed with black to aid the judges.

A fencing match is presided over by a referee. The referee must award a point to the fencer with right of way during the final action in the event of a double touch in foil and saber. A typical bout has one head referee and a video referee and at the request of a fencer can also have two visual referees.

== Figure skating ==
A referee in figure skating sits in the middle of the judges panel and manages and has full control over the entire event. The referee represents the International Skating Union at international events. Referees for international events are trained by the International Skating Union. There are two levels of referee, International Referee and ISU Referee, with ISU Referees ranking higher.

In Synchronized Ice Skating, there are two Referees. One, sits with the Judges as with ordinary competition and operates a touch screen computer, inputting deductions and marking the skaters. The other, known as the Assistant Referee — Ice, stands by the barrier where the teams enter the ice. The ARI monitors ice conditions, communicates with the event Referee and supervises teams.

== Sumo ==
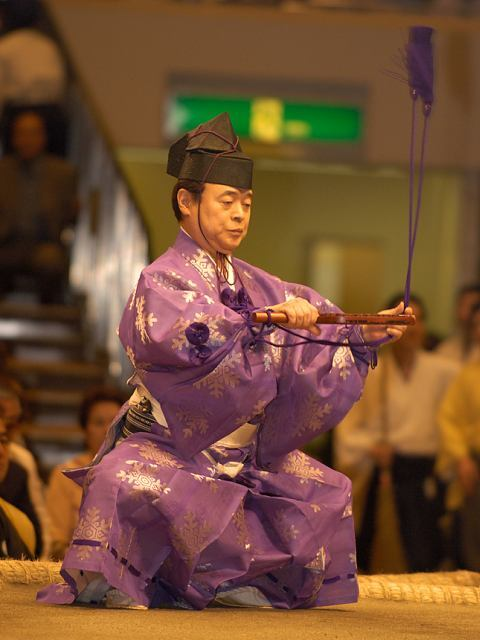
A gyōji in his traditional Japanese uniform; the solid purple tassels on his outfit indicate that he is a top-ranking tate-gyōji.

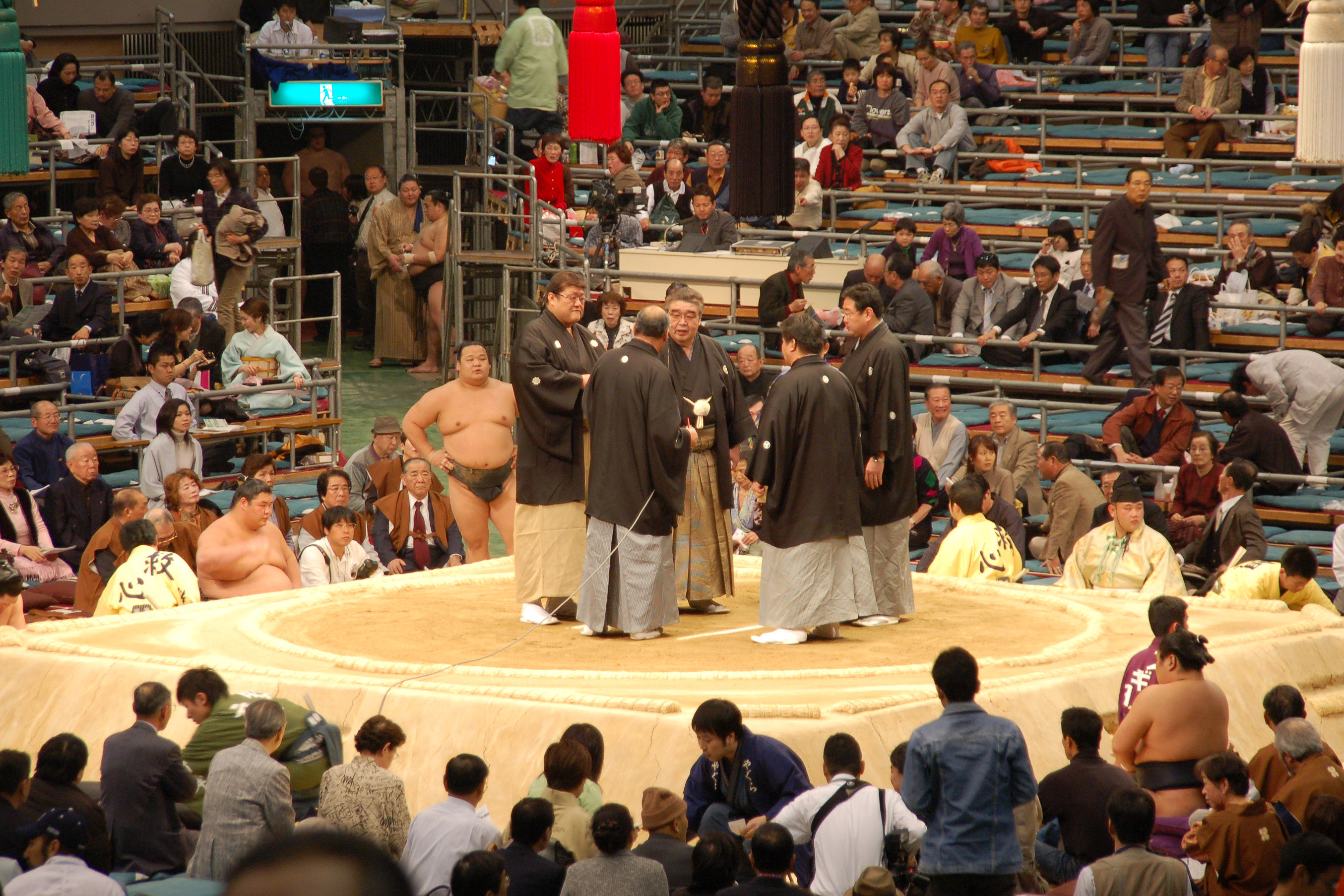
Ringside judges convene a mono-ii in the center of the ring (dohyō) to discuss a ruling or call. The judges are dressed in their personal kimono.

A professional sumo match is overseen by a referee (行司, gyōji) in the ring and five judges (勝負審判, shōbu shimpan) seated around the ring. All dress in traditional Japanese clothing, with higher-ranked referees wearing elaborate silk outfits inspired by clothes worn in ancient Japan and judges wearing traditional men's kimono. The referee oversees the pre-match rituals and the bout itself, including ruling on the winner of the bout and the winning technique used. If one of the umpires disagrees, then all the judges confer to determine the winner of the bout. Tradition holds that if one of the two top ranked gyōji has his decision overturned, he is expected to tender his resignation, although the Chairman of the Japan Sumo Association usually rejects the resignation. Additionally, as professional sumo has several religious and traditional elements apart from the sport itself, gyōji have additional tasks in presiding over various ceremonies and functions.

In an amateur sumo competition, such as those sanctioned by the International Sumo Federation, the roles of referee and judges remain the same as professional sumo, though the religious and traditional elements and tasks for referees have been removed. Referees in amateur sumo wear an all white uniform with black bowtie akin to the appearance of western boxing referees.

== Other terms ==
=== Umpire ===
An umpire is an official in several sports such as baseball and cricket. A few sports such as American and Canadian football (see above) have both a referee and an umpire.

=== Commissaire (cycling) ===
A commissaire is an official in competitive cycling.

=== Marshal (motorsport) ===
Aside the race control who are responsible for the start, running and timekeeping of the race, each section of the circuit is presided by a team of marshals led by an observer, who also report incidents and technical mishap of the race.

=== Range officer (shooting) ===
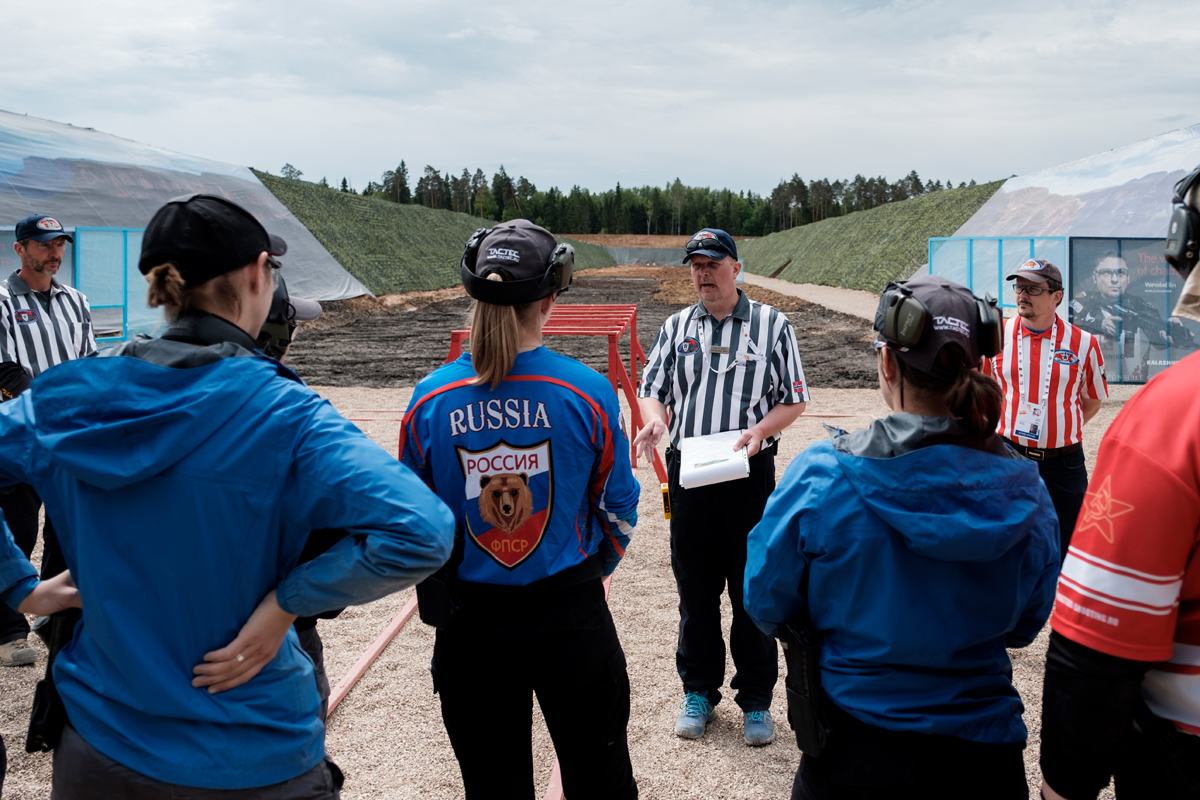
A squad of shooters get their stage brief by an IROA Range Officer on Stage 11 of the 2017 IPSC Rifle World Shoot.

In practical shooting competitions within the IPSC, Range Officers enforce the rules. The International Range Officers Association is the part of IPSC with the responsibility to train and certify range officials in order to ensure that matches are run safely, fair and according to the rules. The Range Officer (RO) is the lowest ranking referee, and the one issuing range commands and following the competitor during the Course of Fire. The Chief Range Officer (CRO) oversees the Range Officer, and has primary authority over the particular course. The overall authority for all officials in the entire match is held by the Range Master (RM).

If an athlete disagree with a call made by a Range Officer, he may consult the Chief Range Officer to challenge the call. If the call is still upheld, the matter may be brought to the Range Master. Finally, if the call is upheld by the Range Master, the athlete may lodge a formal protest to the Arbitration Committee. However, some referee calls may not be challenged by the athlete, particularly those regarding safe firearms handling.

=== Gamemaster (role-playing games) ===
A gamemaster acts as an organizer, officiant for regarding rules, arbitrator, and moderator for a multiplayer role-playing game. They are more common in co-operative games in which players work together than in competitive games in which players oppose each other.

=== Judge (Hebrew language) ===
The Biblical Book of Judges revolves around a succession of leaders (judges). The same word is also used in modern Hebrew for referees in any kind of contest and in particular in sport. To distinguish them from judicial judges and from each other, the kind of the contest is added after the word "shofet" in the Construct state (e.g. "shofet kaduregel" שופט כדורגל, literally "judge of soccer").
