= Salovati Saidzoda =

Russian sumo and sambo wrestler (born 1995)

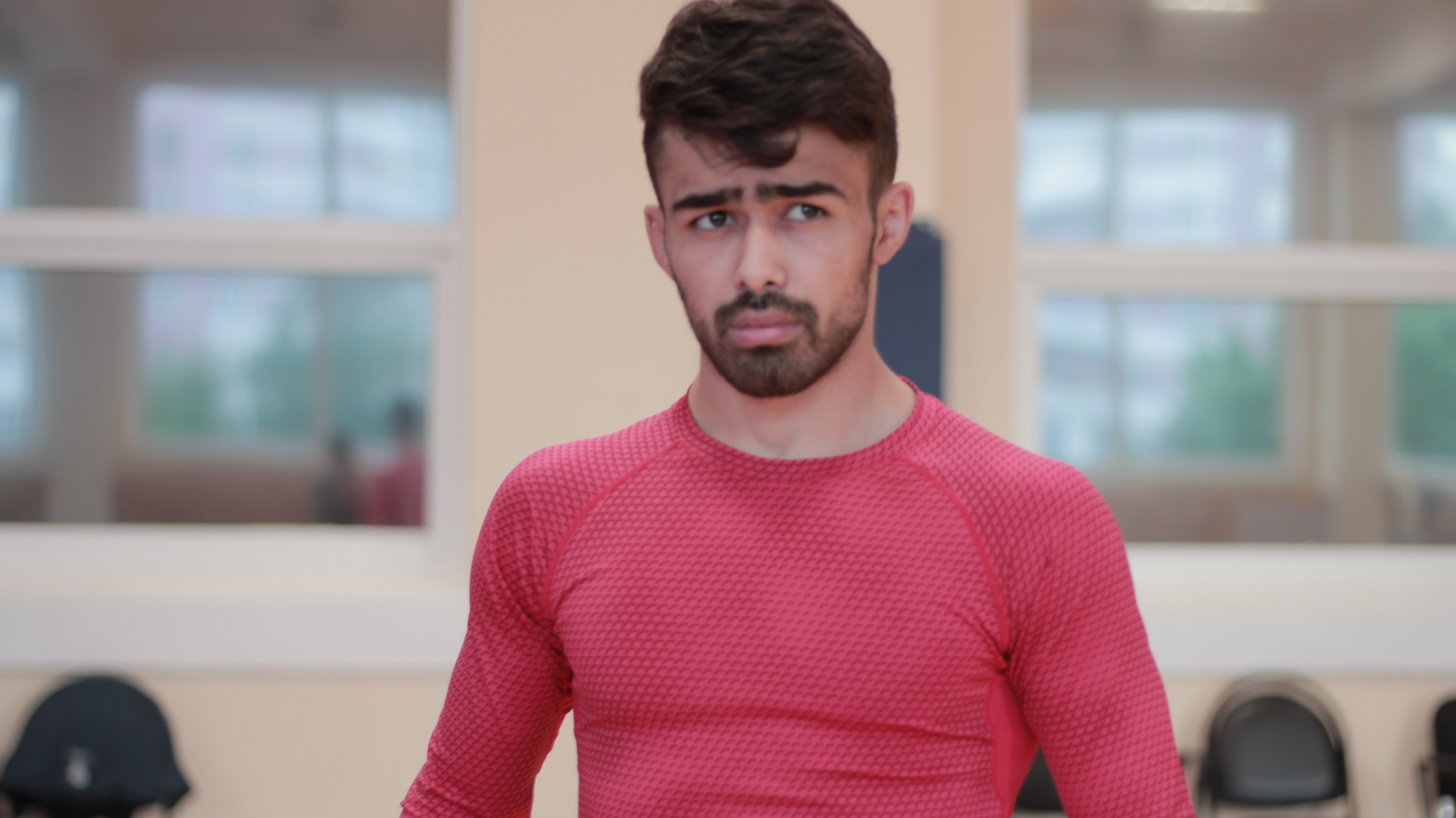

Personal information
- Native name: Саловати Хокиро Саидзода
- Nationality: Russian
- Born: 1 April 1995 (age 31) Dushanbe, Tajikistan
- Height: 174 cm (5 ft 9 in)
- Weight: 70 kg (154 lb)

Sport
- Country: Russia
- Sport: Wrestling
- Event: Sumo
- Club: Borec
Medal record
Sumo
Representing Russia
European Championships
Silver medal – second place	2018 Plovdiv	70 kg
European Cup
Gold medal – first place	2019 Dzerzhinsk	70 kg

Salovati Saidzoda (1 April 1995, Moscow, Russia) is a Russian sumo and sambo wrestler. Two-time European champion (2016 in two age categories), three-time champion of Russia (2015, 2016, 2017). Athlete of the Russian national sumo team. Performs in weight categories up to 60 kg, up to 70 kg. Master of Sports of Russia.

== Biography ==
Saidzoda was born on 1 April 1995 in Republic of Tajikistan in the city of Vahdat. His nationality was Tajik. Until 2 years old he lived in Tajikistan in the city of Dushanbe. He moved to Moscow when he was 2 years old. He started participating in martial arts in 3rd grade. In 2004 he started to train in taekwando. His motivation for sports were action movies of 1990. His first achievements were made in 2007. He became a champion in Moscow Championship. In 2012 he has earned a black belt in taekwando dan. After graduating he was interested in wrestling. In a sports school "Borets" where the headmistress was I.I. Kurinnina (four-time sambo world champion) was developing sumo fighting. He has started to learn sumo fighting techniques and in 2014 he debuted in sumo. In the same year he had earned a bronze medal in Moscow Championship in Russia in the city of Izhevsk. In 2015 for the first time he was a medalist in European Championship in sumo. Since 2017 he started training karate (WKF). He also leads a popular martial arts sports channel on Instagram.

== Sports career ==
In February 2015 he won the Russian Championship in the city of Chekhov.

In May 2015 he earned a silver medal in European Championship in sumo. In November 2015 he won the governor's master cup in the city of Nizhny Novgorod.

In April 2016 he was a two-time champion of Russia in sumo in the weight category of 60 kg.

In May 2016 in Poland he was a Champion of Europe in two age categories below 60 kg and became a two-time champion of Europe.

In February 2017 he became a three-time champion of Russian Champion in sumo in Smolensk in the weight category of 70 kg.

In April 2017 in Tbilisi, Georgia he won a bronze medal, losing to the future Champion of Europe.

In March 2018 won a silver medal in Russian Championship in the weight category of 70 kg.

The European Championship in April 2018 in Bulgaria also brought him a silver medal.

In 2019 in the Russian Championship in the eight category of 70 kg he earned a bronze medal.

In November 2019, in the city of Dzerzhinsk, there was a European cup in which both men and women participated, where Salovati Saidzoda earned a gold medal.

== Actor career ==
Salovati Saidzoda at a young age showed interest in filming in various projects. Fantasy for creativity in ideas has always surprised his audience on various platforms (YouTube, Instagram). Using social networks, he promoted himself as an actor. The movie genre preferably chose where battle scenes were present. He is also a TV presenter in his project: "Rubric - fight with me and get 5000 rubles." with Maxim Novoselov. In the summer of 2019 he took the role of a judge in a film directed by Ilya Ermolov called "Little Warrior".
