= The Little Warrior (2021 film) =

- Directed by: Ilya Ermolov
- Written by: Pavel Ruminov; Roman Melnikov; Sergey Bobza; Alena Baklanova; Ilya Ermolov
- Produced by: Sergey Bobza; Alexey Kucherenko; Oleg Stepanov; Pavel Ruminov; Sergey Volkov
- Starring: Ilya Sigalov; Mariya Lobanova; Nikolai Shrayber; Artyom Bystrov
- Cinematography: Anton Drozdov-Schastlivtsev
- Edited by: Aleksandr Amirov
- Music by: Roman Vishnevsky; Ivan Sintsov
- Production companies: Leopolis Production; Ministry of Culture
- Distributed by: Leopolis Distribution
- Release date: April 26, 2021
- Running time: 84 minutes
- Country: Russia
- Language: Russian
- Budget: ₽40 million

The Little Warrior (Russian: Маленький воин, romanized: Malenky voin) is a 2021 Russian children's sports film directed by Ilya Ermolov about a boy who is fond of sumo. It was released in Russia on April 26, 2021, by Leopolis Distribution.

== Plot ==
The film tells about the boy Vitya Kasatkin, who finds it difficult to communicate with classmates, but he is kind and caring to his mother. Vitya is fond of sumo, the love for which he instilled a father who now lives in Japan. Vitya has a dream - he wants to get to the youth sumo tournament, which is taking place in Japan, in order to bring his dad back to his family.

== Cast ==
- Ilya Sigalov as Vitya Kasatkin, a boy sumo wrestler
- Mariya Lobanova as Gelya, Vitya's classmate
- Nikolai Shrayber as Sumo Coach of Vitya Kasatkin Master
- Artyom Bystrov as Sumo Coach
- Kamil Larin as Vitya Kasatkin's father
- Anna Slyu as Vitya Kasatkin's mother
- Salovati Saidzoda as a judge of sumo competitions
- Viktor Trubachyov as Ivan Yakovlev
- Maksim Lagashkin as Ivan Yakovlev's father
- Yan Tsapnik as Head teacher

== Production ==
=== Filming ===
Principal photography began in 2019 and was slated to premiere in the fall of 2020. But due to the pandemic, it was postponed indefinitely. Also, due to the closure of the borders with Japan, the film crew was unable to shoot the frames that were planned according to the script of the film. An interesting fact is that a small part of the filming took place in Moscow at the sports school "Borets", where the casting of actors was also held.

== Release ==
The film premiered in theaters on April 26, 2021. From July 27, 2021, it is available on the Kion online platform.

== Awards and nominations ==
2021: Nominated for Golden Unicorn Awards in categories of Best Emerging Talent and Best Debut

2021: SCHLINGEL International Film Festival, Mitteldeutscher Rundfunk Special Award
