= Australian Sumo Federation =

Sports governing body in Australia

- Sport: Sumo
- Jurisdiction: Australia
- Abbreviation: ASF
- Founded: 1992; 34 years ago
- Affiliation: International Sumo Federation (ISF)
- President: John Traill
- Vice president: Daniel Bazzana
- Secretary: Bill Temm

Official website
- sumoaustralia.org
- (Australia)

The Australian Sumo Federation is the organisation that currently governs sumo for men and women in Australia.

== Structure ==
The national body has state and club member associations:

- Gold Coast Sumo Club
- Sydney Sumo Club
- Victorian Sumo Association
- Tasmanian Sumo Association

The main tournament they organise is the annual Australian National Sumo Championships and Oceania Sumo Championships.
