= US Sumo Federation =

American sumo organization

United States Sumo Federation
- Sport: Sumo
- Jurisdiction: United States of America
- Abbreviation: USSF
- Affiliation: International Sumo Federation (ISF)
- Headquarters: 827 North Hollywood Way, #473 Los Angeles, CA 91505-2841
- President: Jake Poirier
- Vice president: Justin Kizzart
- Secretary: Daniel Douglas

Official website
- www.ussumo.org
- (United States)

United States Sumo Federation is the organization that currently governs sumo for both men and women in the US. The main tournament they organize is the annual U.S. Sumo National Championships.

== Notable current & past athletes ==
- Emmanuel Yarbrough (5-Time World Openweight Medalist)
- Kellyann Ball (3-Time World Heavyweight Medalist)
- Trent Sabo (2-Time World Lightweight Medalist)
- Eros Armstrong (2025 World Heavyweight Sliver)
- Dominus Davis-Williams (2025 World Openweight Bronze)
- Gabe Tolentino (2025 Jr. Heavyweight Bronze)
- Roy Sims (2016 World Openweight Bronze)
- Sarena Gneiting (2014 Jr. Openweight Bronze)
- Gregory Donofrio (2001 Jr. Middleweight Bronze)
- Harrington Wa’a (1999 Jr. World Openweight Gold)
- Wayne Vierra (1997 World Heavyweight Bronze)
- Nobuo Tsuchiya (1994 World Lightweight Bronze)
- Hideo Su'a (1992 World Middleweight Silver)

== World Medal Teams ==
=== Men's ===
- 1999 Men's Team Bronze
- 1998 Men's Team Silver
- 1997 Men's Team Bronze
- 1995 Men's Team Bronze
- 1994 Men's Team Silver
- 1993 Men's Team Silver
- 1992 Men's Team Silver

=== Women's ===
- 2025 Women's Team Silver-(Kellyann Ball, Eros Armstrong, Mellanease Miranda, Ashley Smallwood)
- 2024 Women's Team Bronze-(Kellyann Ball, Ashley Smallwood, Madison Guinn, Etan Perez)
- 2023 Women's Team Bronze -(Kellyann Ball, Christina Griffin-Jones, Madison Guinn, Etan Perez)

== Notable Association & Clubs ==
- Aloha Sumo Association- Honolulu, HI
- California Sumo Association- Los Angeles, CA Website
- Chicago Sumo Club- Chicago, IL Facebook page
- Dallas Sumo Club- Dallas, TX Website
- Dark Circle Sumo Club- Austin, TX Facebook page
- Florida Sumo Association- Panama City, FL Facebook page
- Georgia Sumo Club- Atlanta, GA Facebook page
- Grand Rapids Sumo Club- Grand Rapids, MI Facebook page
- Honu Sumo Club- San Diego, CA Facebook page
- Iowa Sumo Club- Johnston, IA Facebook page
- Mighty Eagle Sumo Association- San Antonio, TX Facebook page
- New York Sumo Club- New York City, NY Facebook page
- Ohayō Sumo Association- Cincinnati, OH Website
- Raijin Sumo Club- Raleigh, NC Facebook page
- Rain City Sumo- Seattle, WA Instagram page
- Rock City Sumo- Detroit, MI Facebook page
- South Mountain Martial Arts- Madison, NJ Website
- Tennessee Sumo Association- Nashville, TN Facebook page
- Welcome Mat Sumo Club- Kansas City, MO Facebook page
- Welcome Mat NOLA- LaPlace, LA Website

== US Sumo Open results and champions ==
US Sumo Open is the annual sumo competition run by USA Sumo (California Sumo Association) a USSF Affiliated Club. It has been held since 2001 in Los Angeles and has been called the largest amateur sumo event in the world.

| Year | Host | Weight class | Winner | Country |
|---|---|---|---|---|
| 2019 | (United States) Los Angeles | Men's Openweight | Oieksandr Veresiuk | Ukraine |
| 2019 | (United States) Los Angeles | Men's Heavyweight | Oieksandr Veresiuk | Ukraine |
| 2019 | (United States) Los Angeles | Men's Light Heavyweight | Vazha Daiauri | Ukraine |
| 2019 | (United States) Los Angeles | Men's Middleweight | Takeshi Amitani | Japan |
| 2019 | (United States) Los Angeles | Men's Lightweight | Sviatoslav Semykras | Ukraine |
| 2019 | (United States) Los Angeles | Women's Openweight | Ivanna Berezovska | Ukraine |
| 2019 | (United States) Los Angeles | Women's Heavyweight | Ivanna Berezovska | Ukraine |
| 2019 | (United States) Los Angeles | Women's Light Heavyweight | Maryna Maksymenko | Ukraine |
| 2019 | (United States) Los Angeles | Women's Middleweight | Svitlana Kolesnyk | Ukraine |
| 2019 | (United States) Los Angeles | Women's Lightweight | Karyna Koiesnik | Ukraine |
| 2020 | (United States) Los Angeles | Men's Openweight | Jose Galindo | United States |
| 2020 | (United States) Los Angeles | Men's Heavyweight | Jose Galindo | United States |
| 2020 | (United States) Los Angeles | Men's Light Heavyweight | Moataz Elkotb | Egypt |
| 2020 | (United States) Los Angeles | Men's Middleweight | Boldbaatar Baldandorj | Mongolia |
| 2020 | (United States) Los Angeles | Men's Lightweight | Altangerel Dorjtsegmed | Mongolia |
| 2020 | (United States) Los Angeles | Women's Openweight | Yaleidy Galindo | Puerto Rico |
| 2020 | (United States) Los Angeles | Women's Heavyweight | Yaleidy Galindo | Puerto Rico |
| 2020 | (United States) Los Angeles | Women's Light Heavyweight | Diana Betanzo | United States |
| 2020 | (United States) Los Angeles | Women's Middleweight | N/A | N/A |
| 2020 | (United States) Los Angeles | Women's Lightweight | Kristal Betanzo | United States |
| 2021 | (United States) Los Angeles | Men's Openweight | Jose Galindo | United States |
| 2021 | (United States) Los Angeles | Men's Heavyweight | Jose Galindo | United States |
| 2021 | (United States) Los Angeles | Men's Light Heavyweight | Emilio Morales | United States |
| 2021 | (United States) Los Angeles | Men's Middleweight | Erdenebileg Alagdaa | Mongolia |
| 2021 | (United States) Los Angeles | Men's Lightweight | Altangerel Dorjtsegmed | Mongolia |
| 2021 | (United States) Los Angeles | Women's Openweight | Gantogos Garmaa | Mongolia |
| 2021 | (United States) Los Angeles | Women's Heavyweight | Gantogos Garmaa | Mongolia |
| 2021 | (United States) Los Angeles | Women's Light Heavyweight | N/A | N/A |
| 2021 | (United States) Los Angeles | Women's Middleweight | N/A | N/A |
| 2021 | (United States) Los Angeles | Women's Lightweight | N/A | N/A |
| 2022 | (United States) Los Angeles | Men's Openweight | Mendsaikhan Tsogt-Erdene | Mongolia |
| 2022 | (United States) Los Angeles | Men's Heavyweight | Mendsaikhan Tsogt-Erdene | Mongolia |
| 2022 | (United States) Los Angeles | Men's Light Heavyweight | Moataz Elkotb | Egypt |
| 2022 | (United States) Los Angeles | Men's Middleweight | Mohamed Kamal | Egypt |
| 2022 | (United States) Los Angeles | Men's Lightweight | Nomin Batbold | Mongolia |
| 2022 | (United States) Los Angeles | Women's Openweight | Alexsandra Rozum | Poland |
| 2022 | (United States) Los Angeles | Women's Heavyweight | Zuzanna Krystek | Poland |
| 2022 | (United States) Los Angeles | Women's Light Heavyweight | Monika Skiba | Poland |
| 2022 | (United States) Los Angeles | Women's Middleweight | Alexsandra Rozum | Poland |
| 2022 | (United States) Los Angeles | Women's Lightweight | N/A | N/A |
| 2023 | (United States) Los Angeles | Men's Openweight | Mendsaikhan Tsogt-Erdene | Mongolia |
| 2023 | (United States) Los Angeles | Men's Heavyweight | Mendsaikhan Tsogt-Erdene | Mongolia |
| 2023 | (United States) Los Angeles | Men's Light Heavyweight | Fathy Mohamed | Egypt |
| 2023 | (United States) Los Angeles | Men's Middleweight | Usukhbayar Ochirkhuu | Mongolia |
| 2023 | (United States) Los Angeles | Men's Lightweight | Edobor Konyeha | Hungary |
| 2023 | (United States) Los Angeles | Women's Openweight | Munkhtsetsteg Otgo | Mongolia |
| 2023 | (United States) Los Angeles | Women's Heavyweight | Enkhzaya Selenge | Mongolia |
| 2023 | (United States) Los Angeles | Women's Light Heavyweight | Jenni Crook | United States |
| 2023 | (United States) Los Angeles | Women's Middleweight | N/A | N/A |
| 2023 | (United States) Los Angeles | Women's Lightweight | N/A | N/A |
| 2024 | (United States) Los Angeles | Men's Openweight | Badri Khatiskatsi | Georgia |
| 2024 | (United States) Los Angeles | Men's Heavyweight | Lasha Jeladze | Georgia |
| 2024 | (United States) Los Angeles | Men's Light Heavyweight | Wlater Rivas | Venezuela |
| 2024 | (United States) Los Angeles | Men's Middleweight | Abdelrahman Elsefy | Egypt |
| 2024 | (United States) Los Angeles | Men's Lightweight | Enhkbayar Ochirkhuu | Mongolia |
| 2024 | (United States) Los Angeles | Women's Openweight | Esmeralda Cedeno | Venezuela |
| 2024 | (United States) Los Angeles | Women's Heavyweight | Esmeralda Cedeno | Venezuela |
| 2024 | (United States) Los Angeles | Women's Light Heavyweight | N/A | N/A |
| 2024 | (United States) Los Angeles | Women's Middleweight | N/A | N/A |
| 2024 | (United States) Los Angeles | Women's Lightweight | N/A | N/A |
| 2025 | (United States) Los Angeles | Men's Openweight | Zura Tsikoradze | Georgia |
| 2025 | (United States) Los Angeles | Men's Heavyweight | Mendsaikhan Tsogterdene | Mongolia |
| 2025 | (United States) Los Angeles | Men's Light Heavyweight | Saba Gamtenadze | Georgia |
| 2025 | (United States) Los Angeles | Men's Middleweight | Maxim Lugansky | Russia |
| 2025 | (United States) Los Angeles | Men's Lightweight | Mykola Solodonikov | Ukraine |
| 2025 | (United States) Los Angeles | Women's Openweight | Kellyann Ball | United States |
| 2025 | (United States) Los Angeles | Women's Heavyweight | Kellyann Ball | United States |
| 2025 | (United States) Los Angeles | Women's Light Heavyweight | N/A | N/A |
| 2025 | (United States) Los Angeles | Women's Middleweight | N/A | N/A |
| 2025 | (United States) Los Angeles | Women's Lightweight | N/A | N/A |
