= International Sumo Federation =

International sport governing body

- Sport: Sumo
- Jurisdiction: International
- Abbreviation: IFS
- Founded: 10 December 1992; 33 years ago
- Affiliation: Association of IOC Recognised International Sports Federations
- Affiliation date: 1998
- Headquarters: 1-15-20 Hyakunincho; Shinjuku, Tokyo, Japan
- President: (Japan) Hakuhō Shō
- Vice president: (Japan) Mitsuko Yanai
- Secretary: (Japan) Kazufumi Minami

The International Sumo Federation (IFS) is the largest international governing body of sport Sumo with over 87 member countries. It was formed on 10 December 1992 and is the only Sumo organization recognised by the International Olympic Committee and World Anti-Doping Agency.

== History ==
On December 10, 1992, the IFS was established for Amateur sumo. The first Sumo World Championships to be held under the aegis of the IFS was attended by a total of 73 competitors from 25 countries and territories. Thereafter, the Sumo World Championships have been held annually and the number of participants has continued to increase.

In 1995, Six continental Sumo Federations were set up. Each of these federations now holds its own Continental Sumo Federation Championship.

== Members ==
International Sumo Federation has 88 established National Sumo Federations.

International Sumo Federation has two forms of membership, National and Continental.

For example British Sumo is a national federation member whilst the European Sumo Federation is a Continental member.

== Organization ==
International Sumo Federation encourages the sport's development worldwide, including holding international championships. A key aim of the federation is to have Sumo recognized as an Olympic sport. Accordingly, amateur tournaments are divided into weight classes.

== Weight classes ==
=== 1992–2018 ===
Weight class	Men	Women	Jr. Men*	Jr. Women*
Open	Unrestricted	Unrestricted	Unrestricted	Unrestricted
Heavyweight	≥115 kg	≥80 kg	≥100 kg	≥75 kg
Middleweight	85−115 kg	65–80 kg	80–100 kg	60–75 kg
Lightweight	<85 kg	<65 kg	<80 kg	<60 kg

* Age restrictions of 13–18 years old apply

=== 2019–present ===
Weight class	Men	Women	Jr. Men*	Jr. Women*
Open	Unrestricted	Unrestricted	Unrestricted	Unrestricted
Heavyweight	≥115 kg	≥80 kg	≥100 kg	≥75 kg
Light Heavyweight	100–115 kg	73–80 kg	(Unused)	
Middleweight	85−100 kg	65–73 kg	80–100 kg	60–75 kg
Lightweight	<85 kg	<65 kg	<80 kg	<60 kg

* Age restrictions of 13–18 years old apply

== Events ==
=== Discipline championships ===
- Sumo World Championships
- European Sumo Championships
- North American Sumo Championships
- South American Sumo Championships
- Asian Sumo Championships
- African Sumo Championships
- Oceania Sumo Championships

=== Other events ===
- Sumo at the World Games
- World Combat Games

== See also ==
- Honbasho
- Japan Sumo Association
- Professional sumo divisions
- Australian Sumo Federation
- US Sumo Federation
