= 2018 European Sumo Championships =

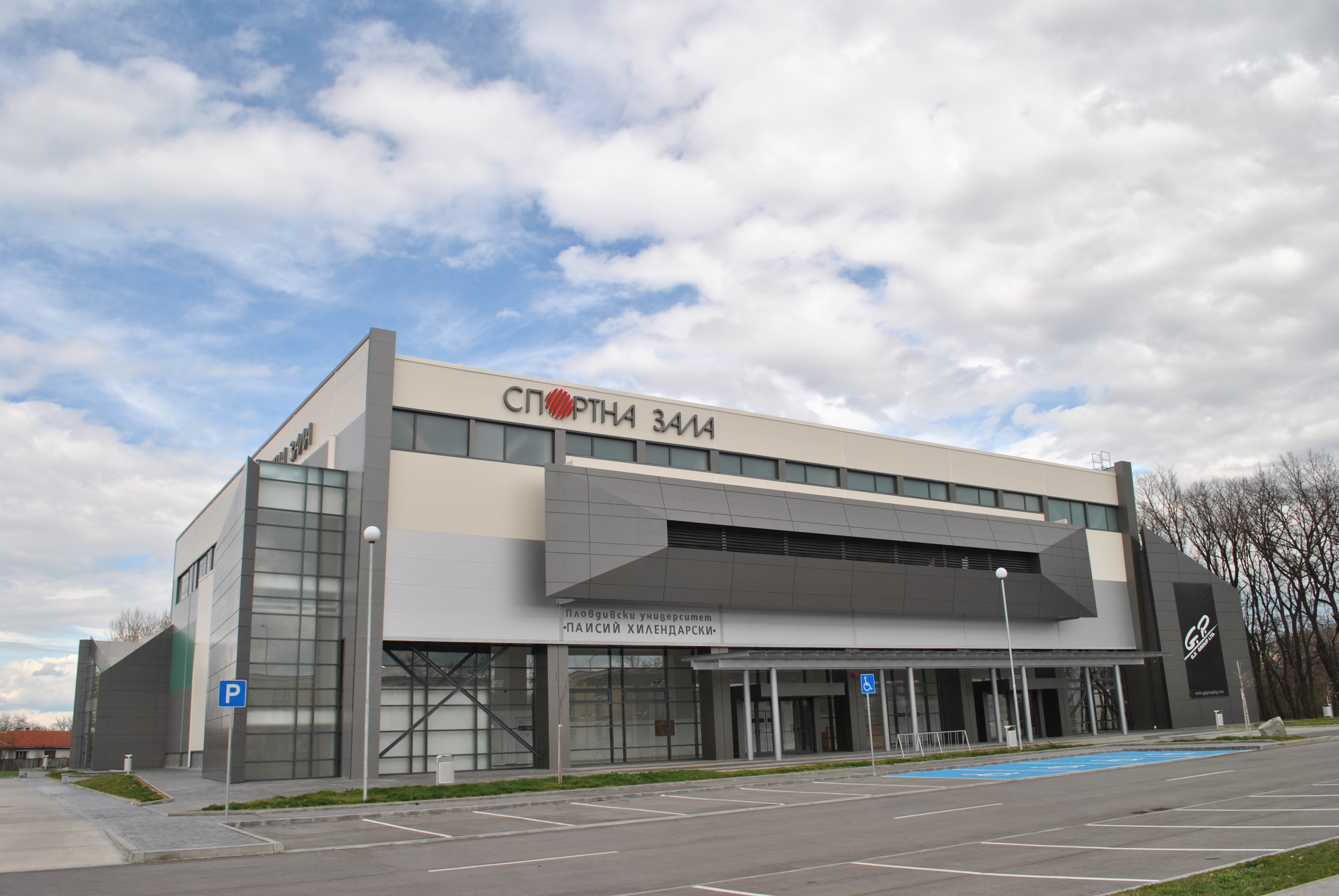
- Venue: University of Plovdiv Paisii Hilendarski. Sport structures
- Dates: 2018.04.26
- Competitors: 2018.04.29

The 2018 European Sumo Championships took place in Plovdiv (Bulgaria). from April 26 to 30, 2018. The European Sumo Federation and the Bulgarian Sumo Federation.

== Medal overview (U23 Men's) ==
U23 Men's	Gold	Silver	Bronze
-70 kg	(Russia) Biamba Sanchat (RUS)	(Russia) Salovati Saidzoda (RUS)	(Poland) Wojciech Lenczewski (POL) (Ukraine) Serhii Haidar (UKR)
-77 kg	(Russia) Arzhaan Ondar (RUS)	(Estonia) Roman Markilov (EST)	(Russia) Dmitry Sharov (RUS) (Poland) Karol Stasiewicz (POL)
-85 kg	(Ukraine) Anatolii Khliustin (UKR)	(Hungary) Richard Vegh (HUN)	(Ukraine) Artem Suroviahin (UKR) (Hungary) Jozsef Delceg (HUN)
-92 kg	(Russia) Kaigal-OOl Ondar (RUS)	(Poland) Rafal Glodek (POL)	(Italy) Matta Quaranta (ITA) (Hungary) Benedek Laczko (HUN)
-100 kg	(Russia) Maksim Lugansky (RUS)	(Russia) Mergen Mongush (RUS)	(Bulgaria) Mert Emin (BUL) (Azerbaijan) Chingiz Samadov (AZE)
-115 kg	(Georgia (country)) Shamili Gogotchuri (GEO)	(Italy) Enrico Zanetti (ITA)	(Ukraine) Vladyslav Viun (UKR) (Georgia (country)) Nikoloz Sisvadze (GEO)
+115 kg	(Georgia (country)) Giorgi Paradashvili (GEO)	(Georgia (country)) Lasha Jeladze (GEO)	(Russia) Aidash Danzy-Belek (RUS) (Ukraine) Maksym Oleshko (UKR)
Open kg	(Georgia (country)) Giga Gelashvili (GEO)	(Azerbaijan) Jamal Feyziev (AZE)	(Russia) Maksim Luganskiy (RUS) (Ukraine) Maksym Oleshko (UKR)
Team kg	(Georgia (country)) Georgia (GEO)	Azerbaijan (AZE)	Hungary (HUN)

== Medal overview (Senior Men) ==
Senior Men	Gold	Silver	Bronze
-70 kg	(Russia) Roland Ondar (RUS)	(Poland) Pawel Pieprzak (POL)	(Bulgaria) Dimitar Rangelov (BUL) (Ukraine) Oleksandr Kozyriev (UKR)
-77 kg	(Russia) Ilkham Aliev (RUS)	(Bulgaria) Antonio Grozev (BUL)	(Ukraine) Oleg Davydenko (UKR) (Poland) Mateusz Konieczny (POL)
-85 kg	(Russia) Subudai Shoidun (RUS)	(Russia) Artysh Oorzhak (RUS)	(Bulgaria) Pencho Dochev (BUL) (Ukraine) Sviatoslav Semykaras (UKR)
-92 kg	(Bulgaria) Nikolay Nikolov (BUL)	(Ukraine) Ruslan Rusanov (UKR)	(Russia) Kaigal-Ool Ondar (RUS) (Hungary) Erik Szilagyi (HUN)
-100 kg	(Bulgaria) Mert Emin (BUL)	(Russia) Maksim Lugansky (RUS)	(Bulgaria) Ivan Blagoev (BUL) (Azerbaijan) Chingiz Samadov (AZE)
-115 kg	(Russia) Sayin-Belek Tiulush (RUS)	(Bulgaria) Mikhail Iliev (BUL)	(Russia) Konstantin Abdula-Zade (RUS) (Ukraine) Vazha Daiauri (UKR)
+115 kg	(Russia) Vasily Margiev (RUS)	(Russia) Edvard Kudzoev (RUS)	(Georgia (country)) Zurab Akubardia (GEO) (Ukraine) Oleksandr Veresiuk (UKR)
Open kg	(Russia) Ruslan Bagaev (RUS)	(Russia) Vasily Margiev (RUS)	(Poland) Jacek Piersiak (POL) (Ukraine) Oleksandr Veresiuk (UKR)
Team kg	Russia (RUS)	(Georgia (country)) Georgia (GEO)	Ukraine (UKR); Bulgaria (BUL)

== Medal overview (U23 Women's) ==
U23 Women's	Gold	Silver	Bronze
-55 kg	(Russia) Kristina Golakova (RUS)	(Ukraine) Valeriia Kolesnyk (UKR)	(Poland) Sylwia Kaminska (POL) (Poland) Klaudia Pieprzak (POL)
-60 kg	(Poland) Sara Rejniak (POL)	(Russia) Nigina Akobirova (RUS)	(Russia) Iana Kozhaniva (RUS) (Poland) Aleksandra Rozum (POL)
-65 kg	(Russia) Polina Danina (RUS)	(Ukraine) Olena Nikitinska (UKR)	(Bulgaria) Izabel Hristova (BUL) (Russia) Violetta Tsyplenkova (RUS)
-73 kg	(Russia) Anastasiia Frasiniuk (RUS)	(Poland) Magda Skrajnowska (POL)	(Bulgaria) Gabriela Gigova (BUL) (Ukraine) Iryna Hrebenchiuk (UKR)
-80 kg	(Russia) Svatlana Petrova (RUS)	(Ukraine) Iryna Chorobai (UKR)	(Estonia) Enelin Leichter (EST)
-95 kg	(Russia) Lilia Vitskopova (RUS)	(Poland) Sara Krol (POL)	
+95 kg	(Russia) Ksenia Danilina (RUS)	(Russia) Tatiana Artamonova (RUS)	(Estonia) Kai Pahkel (EST)
Open kg	(Russia) Svetlana Petrova (RUS)	(Ukraine) Yelyzaveta Morenko (UKR)	(Russia) Lilia Vitskopova (RUS)
Team kg	Russia (RUS)	Poland (POL)	Estonia (EST)

== Medal overview (Senior Women) ==
Senior Women	Gold	Silver	Bronze
-55 kg	(Russia) Kristina Golakova (RUS)	(Poland) Sylwia Kaminska (POL)	(Poland) Magdalena Chrusciel (POL) (Bulgaria) Ivanka Barutchiyska (BUL)
-60 kg	(Ukraine) Valeriia Odintsova (UKR)	(Russia) Iana Kozhaniva (RUS)	(Bulgaria) Gencheva Violeta (BUL) (Russia) Aleksandra Ermolova (RUS)
-65 kg	(Russia) Vera Koval (RUS)	(Poland) Monika Skiba (POL)	(Poland) Magdalena Macios (POL) (Bulgaria) Izabel Hristova (BUL)
-73 kg	(Poland) Anastasiia Frasiniuk Magda Skrajnowska (POL)	(Russia) Anastasiia Frasiniuk (RUS)	(Russia) Nina Strakhova (RUS) (Estonia) Gea Reimund (EST)
-80 kg	(Russia) Ekaterina Alekseeva (RUS)	(Russia) Svetlana Petrova (RUS)	(Bulgaria) Olya Kovacheva (BUL) (Germany) Kerstin Schmidtsdorf (GER)
-95 kg	(Russia) Lilia Vitskopova (RUS)	(Poland) Sara Krol (POL)	(Poland) Natalia Brzykcy (POL) (Germany) Arnika Schulze (GER)
+95 kg	(Russia) Anna Poliakova (RUS)	(Ukraine) Svitlana Yaromka (UKR)	(Ukraine) Viktoriia Tsaruk (UKR)
Open kg	(Russia) Anna Poliakova (RUS)	(Russia) Ekaterina Gordeeva (RUS)	(Ukraine) Maryna Maksymenko (UKR) (Ukraine) Svitlana Yaromka (UKR)
Team kg	Russia (RUS)	Ukraine (UKR)	Poland (POL)
