= European Sumo Championships =

The European Sumo Championships are two rival sumo competitions organized by the European Sumo Union (ESU) and the European Sumo Federation. A split occurred in 2012, where two rival championships were held, the ESU event taking place in Hungary on June 16–17 and the rival breakaway event taking place in Ukraine on the same weekend and officially recognized by the International Sumo Federation.

== Summary of Championships ==
The list is incomplete

Year	City	Country	Date	Venue	No. of Athletes
2002	Moscow	Russia			
2003	Riesa	Germany			
2005	Leányfalu	Hungary			
2006	Riesa	Germany			
2007	Budapest	Hungary	15–17 June		
2008	Koźmin	Poland			
2009	Renens	Switzerland			
2010	Varna	Bulgaria			
2011	Varna	Bulgaria			
2012	Budapest	Hungary	16–17 June		
2013	Ponitz	Germany			
2014	Samokov	Bulgaria	14–15 June		
2015	Šiauliai	Lithuania	7–10 May		
2016	Krotoszyn	Poland	23–24 April		
2018	Plovdiv	Bulgaria	27–29 April		
2019	Tallinn	Estonia	18–21 April		
2020	cancelled due to the COVID-19 pandemic				
2021	Kazan	Russia	24-28 June		
2022	Krotoszyn	Poland	1–4 September		
2023	Krotoszyn	Poland	20–24 April		
2024	Loutraki	Greece	24–26 May		
2025	Szigetszentmiklós	Hungary	23–25 May		
2026	Stirling	Scotland	26–28 June		
