= Teaching and Higher Education Act 1998 =

Act of the Parliament of the United Kingdom

Teaching and Higher Education Act 1998 (Note: Section 46(1).)
- Act of Parliament
- Parliament of the United Kingdom
- Long title: An Act to make provision for the establishment of General Teaching Councils for England and Wales and with respect to the registration, qualifications and training of teachers and the inspection of such training; to make new provision with respect to grants and loans to students in higher or further education and fees payable by them; to make provision with respect to the funding of higher education institutions and certain further education, and other matters relating to further and higher education institutions; to enable the higher and further education funding councils in Scotland to discharge certain functions jointly; to enable young persons to have time off work for study or training; to make provision with respect to the inspection of training and careers services provided in pursuance of arrangements or directions under the Employment and Training Act 1973; to provide that the Scottish Further Education Funding Council shall be a relevant body for the purposes of section 19(5) of the Disability Discrimination Act 1995; and for connected purposes.
- Citation: 1998 c. 30
- Territorial extent: England and Wales; Scotland (in part); Northern Ireland (in part); (Note: Section 46(5)–(9).)

Dates
- Royal assent: 16 July 1998
- Commencement: Various (Note: Section 46(3)–(4))
Other legislation
Amends	House of Commons Disqualification Act 1975; Education (Scotland) Act 1980; Further and Higher Education Act 1992; Employment Rights Act 1996; Education Act 1996
Amended by	Safeguarding Vulnerable Groups Act 2006

Status: Amended

Text of statute as originally enacted

Revised text of statute as amended

The Teaching and Higher Education Act 1998 (c. 30) is an act of the Parliament of the United Kingdom under the first Tony Blair government on 16 July 1998. It enabled universities to charge tuition fees, and established statutory General Teaching Councils (GTC's) for England, Wales and Northern Ireland and the modification the remit of the General Teaching Council for Scotland. The act also made provision for the new system of student loans that were introduced, and introduces paid leave from work for training towards a qualification. The passing of this act repealed the Education (Student Loans) Act 1998, and the sections relating to student finance in the Education Act 1996. The student loans system was later updated in the Higher Education Act 2004.

The Teaching and Higher Education Act is divided into four parts, which can be summarised as follows:

== Part one ==
=== Chapter One ===
- General Teaching Councils will be established in England, Wales and Northern Ireland.
- Duty of GTC Scotland towards disabled persons and the representation of Special needs teachers.
- Teachers at maintained schools in the UK are required to register with their GTC.
- Teachers must abide by the GTC for England Code of Conduct and the GTC for Wales Code of Conduct.

=== Chapter Two ===
- Headteachers in schools in England and Wales (with some exceptions) must have a professional headship qualification.
- This chapter also makes provision for the inspection of teacher training institutions.

=== Chapter Three ===
- All newly qualified teachers in the England and Wales are required to pass an induction period of three school terms (one school year). At the end of this period the headteacher is required to make a recommendation to the appropriate body as to whether the new teacher has achieved the standards set by the GTC.

== Part two ==
- This section outlines, in very broad terms, the system of student loans in the UK. A non-governmental body was set up in 1989 (see Student Loans Company) to administer the awarding and recovery of these loans. The Student Loans Company is not directly mentioned in this section however; the statute only calls for the Secretary of State to administer these loans.

== Part three ==
- An insert to the Employment Rights Act 1996 which states that any employee who is 16 or 17, and not in full-time education, and 'has not attained such standard of achievement as is prescribed by regulations made by the Secretary of State', is entitled to take time off their working hours to undertake training for a qualification.
- 'An employee who is permitted to take time off...is entitled to be paid remuneration by his employer for the time taken off at the appropriate hourly rate'.

== Part four ==
- Miscellaneous additions, including the re-affirmation that the only educational services in the UK allowed to use the title 'University' are those that are authorised by act of parliament or by Royal Charter, or have been approved by the Privy Council.

== See also ==
- UK enterprise law
