= Graduate Teacher Programme =

The Graduate Teacher Programme (GTP) was a programme in England and Wales for graduates who want to gain Qualified Teacher Status while working. A person must work in a school as an unqualified teacher in order to participate in the programme, which can last from three months to a year. The Department for Education announced in mid-2012 that The Graduate Teacher Programme will no longer exist, and has now been replaced with a new scheme called School Direct. The last academic year the programme ran was 2012/2013.

== Getting a place ==
To obtain a GTP place, a candidate must usually secure a training placement themselves at a school willing to support them as an unqualified teacher. However, some institutions organise this for them. The school will then offer to employ the student as a supernumerary teacher (i.e. not being used as substitute for employing a qualified teacher). With the school's backing, a formal application must then be made to a Designated Recommending Body (DRB). These are normally universities, colleges, local authorities or private educational companies. The DRB administers the application process, making the formal selection of successful candidates, and the payment of the TDA grant to the school, and provides tutor support for the student. Numbers are limited by the money made available by the TDA.

In some cases it is possible to make a self-funded application. In these cases, an application must still be made to a DRB but the school provides the entire salary for the trainee.

Applications are normally made towards the end of the calendar year up to February for entry to the school in September, but every DRB has its own arrangements and dates for application deadlines. Sometimes a second competition for places is held within the year if some spaces have not been filled. Places are awarded according to the quality of the candidate, and also the supporting school which the DRB must believe is capable of offering the appropriate standard of support.

== Availability of the GTP ==
The GTP is not available evenly across England and Wales though places available broadly reflect regional population densities. Competition can be very fierce since the salary-based training is much better paid than a Postgraduate Certificate of Education (PGCE) course, and is especially attractive to mature entrants. Subjects available also vary greatly both regionally and by DRB.

GTP students normally train in a single subject in which they must have a degree. Places for Primary and Secondary Shortage (e.g. Mathematics, Science and English) exceed those available for Secondary Non-Shortage (e.g. History). Some DRBs only offer places for Primary and Secondary Shortage.

== The training ==
Training commences by working a small portion of a normal timetable (around 30%), and this gradually builds up over the year to 90% in the third term. The GTP will be supernumerary (in all but a very few exceptional circumstances), which means that qualified teachers must already be employed by the school to teach the classes allocated to the student. School policy varies on how day-to-day teaching by the student is allowed. Some schools will leave students to teach whole classes from the outset, supervised at a distance by the qualified teacher whose class it is and by the school-based mentor and senior tutor. Some schools will insist that the student only 'team-teach' with the qualified teacher present at all times until it is felt the student can cope on his or her own.

GTP students are allowed to train on a more limited age range than the PGCE. At secondary level an example would be to train in two Key Stages, such as Key Stage 3 (Years 7-9 ages 11–14) and Key Stage 4 (Years 10-11, ages 14–16), rather than the full age range of 11-18. However, many GTP trainees will teach across the full 11-18 age-range and will invariably teach far more in those Key Stages than a PGCE student would.

Alongside their teaching, the student has to compile dossiers of evidence to record lesson plans, observations and other experiences. These must prove they have reached each of the Training and Development Agency for Schools' 33 Standards required to achieve Qualified Teacher Status. The quantity and quality of evidence considered necessary to fulfil each Standard varies between DRBs, since the DRB has to interpret the TDA's requirements. In England only, the student must also complete the QTS Skills Tests to fulfil Standard 16. This is not required in Wales.

A placement of several weeks at a second contrasting school is also required to ensure the training is not overly school-specific. for example, a trainee at a single sex grammar school might have a second placement at a mixed comprehensive.

Throughout the training year the student is regularly inspected by the school-based senior tutor and mentor (usually departmental colleagues). A number of inspections of teaching and the portfolio are made by staff from the DRB.

Students also have to produce evidence of research in the form of written assignments. The number of assignments and their individual length and content varies between the DRBs.

Historically, GTP students attended a number of centrally taught days administered by their DRB, which varied from DRB to DRB. Some, for example, offered six taught days distributed throughout the year. Others offered fortnightly taught days. However, since September 2008 there is a standardised requirement for all trainees to undertake 60 days of training, shared between the DRB and the school.

The reason for the change is to make the GTP a more academic-based qualification which will enjoy broader recognition, and also provide a basis for credits towards a Master of Education degree (MEd). The intention is to attract a higher calibre of applicants, especially well-qualified graduates who might otherwise have opted for the costly but better-recognised PGCE course.

== Completion of training ==
On completion of the training year, the successful student is recommended for Qualified Teacher Status (QTS) by the DRB. This is then normally awarded through the General Teaching Council for England or the General Teaching Council for Wales, allowing the student to work as a teacher in England or Wales. In exceptional instances QTS can be awarded in less time, but this is rare. QTS may be withheld if the relevant teaching council is unhappy about the standard of training offered by the DRB. This, too, is very rare.

== International recognition ==
Unlike academic-based teaching qualifications such as the PGCE, the GTP is not well recognised outside England and Wales, with evaluation services in countries including Scotland, Australia and New Zealand and Canada finding it difficult to evaluate employment-based training teacher training pathways.

== History ==
The GTP was first offered in 1998. It was originally aimed at mature entrants to the teaching profession, who could not afford to give up work and undertake a traditional method of teacher training such as the PGCE. Because of this, the programme was restricted to those aged 24 and over. However, the age requirement was dropped in 2004 to avoid breaking new European Union discrimination laws.

== See also ==
- Registered Teacher Programme
