= Postgraduate Certificate in Education =

British educational certification

- Acronym: PGCE
- Type: Postgraduate study
- Duration: 1 or 2 years (1-3 in South Africa)
- Prerequisites: Typically a bachelor's degree

The Postgraduate Certificate in Education (PGCE/PGCertEd) is a one- or two-year higher education course in England, Wales, Northern Ireland, and South Africa which provides training in order to allow graduates to become teachers within maintained schools. In England, there are two routes available to gaining a PGCE: either on a traditional university-led teacher training course or school-led teacher training. In South Africa – where it can take up to three years – the PGCE degree is one of only two ways to become a teacher, with the other being a Bachelor of Education degree. In some academic institutions a Postgraduate Award (PGA) can qualify for a PGCert as a degree above a bachelor's degree.

In addition to gaining the PGCE qualification itself, those who have successfully completed the course in England or Wales are recommended for qualified teacher status (QTS) – the requirement to teach in state maintained schools in England and Wales. Those passing PGCEs in Northern Ireland are granted "eligibility to teach" in Northern Ireland (equivalent to QTS). Though the QTS/eligibility to teach applies in only the home nation in which it was awarded, applying for QTS/eligibility to teach in either of the other two home nations is a formality, and is nearly always awarded to PGCE holders. Furthermore, the PGCE is also widely recognised in Scotland, allowing holders to register easily as teachers there.

The PGCE was previously also offered in Scotland, but was renamed the Professional Graduate Diploma in Education (PGDE) from 2005 to 2006 (the exact year depending on the university offering it). It is identical in content to the previous PGCE.

Applications for admission to PGCE courses are handled by UCAS Teacher Training. Further and higher education lecturers are not usually required to hold QTS/eligibility to teach. However, many lecturers attend training courses to gain qualifications such as the Postgraduate Certificate in Further Education (PGCFE), which is comparable to the regular PGCE. There is also the PGCHE for university practitioners."

== Course content and structure ==
The PGCE is a professional qualification normally taught at a university or other higher education institution, with much of the course time spent on placements in local schools. A trainee teacher will have to meet the standards for qualified teacher status and any course specific requirements to be awarded the PGCE. In England only, a trainee teacher also has to pass the professional skills tests before starting a course. The training provider will then recommend the trainee teacher for QTS to the relevant body:

- The National College for Teaching and Leadership (England)
- General Teaching Council for Wales (Wales)

or eligibility to teach to the:

- General Teaching Council for Northern Ireland (Northern Ireland)

After gaining QTS, the candidate becomes a newly qualified teacher (NQT) and embarks on an induction programme in their first post.

== Equivalence ==
The Postgraduate Certificate in Education (PGCE/PGCertEd) sits at Level 7 of the Framework for Higher Education Qualifications, while the Professional Certificate in Education (ProfGCE) sits a Level 6. The PGCE is not a postgraduate degree; it is instead an advanced but non-degree qualification (as it is directly related to a career, it is considered vocational).

From 2005 to 2007, most universities attached credits towards a master's degree to their PGCertEds. PGCEs that do not carry master's credits are now known as Professional Graduate Certificate in Education.

A recent review of the equivalence of qualifications in Scotland declared the PGCertEd to be equivalent to a postgraduate diploma (which in turn is equivalent to the taught element of a master's degree). This left the PGCE with a rather inappropriate name as a postgraduate certificate is a lower level than the postgraduate diploma, requiring only half the amount of work. As a result, the PGCE in Scotland were renamed to Professional Graduate Diploma in Education (PGDE).

The PGCE in Lifelong Learning or Post-Compulsory Education and Training (PCET) is considered to be equivalent to the Diploma in Teaching in the Lifelong Learning Sector (DTLLS) at QCF Level 7. The DTLLS was also taught at QCF Level 5.

According to Education International, equivalency assessments place the PGCE as equivalent to a master's-level degree in the United States and Canada. Although the program is shorter in delivery time than a typical master's-level program, its intensive delivery model (specifically within Wales, offered by University of Wales Trinity Saint David) meets all requirements to confer this type of postgraduate degree in North America.

== Fees ==
For PGCE courses in England, a fee of £9,250 will normally be charged, which can be borrowed (at interest) from Student Finance England.

In September 2012, the government introduced a new initiative with the aim of encouraging the best graduates into the teaching profession, particularly in mathematics, physics, computer science, chemistry and modern foreign languages.

PGCE Financial Support
Subject	Bursary	Scholarship
Chemistry	£24,000	£26,000
Computing	£24,000	£26,000
Maths	£24,000	£26,000
Physics	£24,000	£26,000
Classics	£10,000	Not available
Languages	£10,000	Not available
Biology	£7,000	Not available

== Independent schools ==
Teachers in independent schools in England, Wales and Northern Ireland are not required to hold any particular qualifications, although most schools now prefer applicants to have a PGCE, especially younger people going into teaching as a first career. This flexibility does allow them to occasionally hire older people who have practical experience, such as appointing ex-engineers as mathematics or physics teachers, or appointing people with high-level postgraduate qualifications but no formal teacher-training.

== Other qualifications ==
The PGCE is the main postgraduate route for teacher training in England and Wales, but there are a number of other ways to gain QTS. See Qualified Teacher Status#Routes to QTS.

== See also ==
- School-Centred Initial Teacher Training
