= Churchill Community College =

Churchill Academy

Location
- Churchill Street; Wallsend, Tyne and Wear, NE28 7TN; England; 55.005045°N 1.507084°W

Information
- Type: Academy
- Motto: Excellence in all we do
- Local authority: North Tyneside Council
- Trust: North East Learning Trust
- Department for Education URN: 108641 Tables
- Ofsted: Reports
- Chair of Governors: Tracy Booth MBE
- Executive Headteacher: Jo Lamb
- Gender: Mixed
- Age: 11 to 19
- Enrolment: 713
- Capacity: 1022
- Houses: Discovery; Atlantis; Ranger; Endeavour
- Website: Official website

Churchill Academy is a mixed secondary school in Wallsend, Tyne and Wear, England. The College teaches students between the ages of 11-18 and is registered to provide SCITT training.

== Ofsted Status ==
In 2014, The College obtained "outstanding" status in all areas by Ofsted. Churchill Community College was also rated "one of the best in country", with only 11% of secondary schools in the United Kingdom to achieve this status. In 2019 the schools status was lowered to "good" following a drop in student results and a less effective use of funding.

As of 2024, The College has been given a status of "inadequate", contradicting the school's motto of "Excellence in all we do"

== Sixth form ==
Churchill Community College and Burnside Business and Enterprise College Sixth Forms have a strong tradition of collaboration.

== School-Centred Initial Teacher Training (SCITT) ==
The College is a provider of SCITT training for PGCE students.

== PALS ==
=== Personal Achievement through Learning Support ===
PALS was created to target Key Stage 4 students, offering:
Full-time supervised, statutory education for pupils coming into borough and without a mainstream school.
Full/part-time supervised, statutory education for pupils referred by the North Tyneside Secondary Education Improvement Partnership (EIP) of schools via the Secondary Support Team (SST).

The aim of PALS is to "To maximise attainment and progress of mainstream pupils at serious risk of permanent exclusion or who are without a school place."

=== Ofsted report for PALS ===
- PALS 2013 Ofsted Report

== Notable former pupils ==
- Callum Roberts, footballer

== Churchill Family of Schools ==
Comprises Churchill Community College and the 5 primary schools in its locality:

- Battle Hill Primary School
- Denbigh Community Primary School
- Hadrian Park Primary School
- Holy Cross R C Primary School
- Stephenson Memorial Primary School
