= PGD =

PGD may refer to:

== Science and medicine ==
- Patient group directions, documents in the National Health Service of England
- Platform gate doors, a term referring to waist or chest height platform screen doors
- Preimplantation genetic diagnosis, genetic profiling of embryos prior to implantation
- Primary graft dysfunction, a complication of organ transplantation
- Prolonged grief disorder, a syndrome consisting of a distinct set of symptoms following the death of a loved one
- Proper generalized decomposition, a numerical method for solving boundary value problems
- Projected gradient descent, an optimization algorithm

== Qualifications ==
- Postgraduate diploma (PgD), an academic qualification
- Professional Graduate Diploma (disambiguation), one of two UK academic qualifications
  - Professional Graduate Diploma in Information Technology, an academic qualification equal to the third (final) year of a UK honors degree, awarded by the British Computer Society (BCS)
  - Professional Graduate Diploma in Education, one-year course in Scotland for undergraduate degree holders

== Other uses ==
- Partido Galeguista Demócrata, a political party in Galicia, Spain
- Punta Gorda Airport (Florida) (IATA code), formerly Charlotte County Airport, US
