= NQT =

NQT is a three-letter abbreviation and may refer to:

- Nottingham Airport, Nottinghamshire, England, United Kingdom
- Newly qualified teacher, teachers in the United Kingdom who have not yet completed a twelve-month induction subsequent to gaining Qualified Teacher Status
