= General Teaching Council =

General Teaching Council could mean:

- General Teaching Council for Scotland
- General Teaching Council for Northern Ireland
- General Teaching Council for England (until 2012)
- General Teaching Council for Wales (until 2015)
