= Ellen Moir =

American nonprofit executive

Ellen Moir is the founder and CEO of The New Teacher Center. Established in 1998, the Center is devoted to the development, induction, and mentoring of beginning teachers.

== Professional career ==
Moir began her career as a bilingual teacher in Santa Paula, California in 1972. In 1978, she became supervisor of teacher education at UCSC, and a lecturer in the education department. From 1985 to 2000, Moir was Director of Teacher Education at UCSC.

Moir launched the Santa Cruz New Teacher Project in 1988, an innovative new teacher support program that she has directed since its inception. She founded the New Teacher Center in 1998.

Moir has published articles in a number of professional journals, including Educational Leadership, the Journal of Staff Development, and Teacher Education Quarterly.

== Biography ==
Moir holds a B.A. from California State University, Northridge and an M.A. from San Jose State University.

== Awards and honors ==
Moir was a recipient of the 2005 Harold W. McGraw, Jr. Prize in Education. In 2003, she received the California Council on Teacher Education Distinguished Teacher Educator Award. On November 10, 2010, Moir was named as a Purpose Prize Fellow. Purpose Prizes recognize those over 60 years of age who are in their second career and have made an impact on society. Moir received the Ashoka fellowship in 2011 for her work with the New Teacher Center.
