= Early Years Professional Status =

British teaching qualification

Early Years Professional Status (EYPS) is a Level 6 qualification that gives professional status for practitioners in England at the Early Years Foundation Stage (ages 0 – 5), which is intended to be broadly equivalent to Qualified Teacher Status (ages 5 – 18). Introduced by the British government in 2007, via the Children's Workforce Development Council, EYPS courses require a degree, and include an assessment in an early years setting – either a placement or within the trainee's own early years workplace. In Scotland the Childhood Practice Award (either a professional development award, a practice based ordinary degree or a post-graduate diploma) similarly requires those who lead and manage Early Years (In Scotland Childhood Practice incorporates all those working in non-compulsory children's services 0–16).

The original idea saw that by 2010, all early years children's centres in England (of which there are nearly 3000) will be required to have at least one Early Years Professional (EYP), and by 2015, all full daycare settings will be required to have at least one, which will require 20,000 EYPs.

In 2013, Early Years Professional Status was replaced by Early Years Teacher Status (EYTS). The numbers of people undertaking training is falling each year. There is little financial or business incentive (beyond the training fees paid, and funds paid to settings) for anyone to undertake the qualification due to the limited government funding of Early Years.

In early 2009, there were more than 2,500 graduate-level EYPs and a further 2,400 in training in 35 higher education institutions. In Scotland, since 2011, it is a registration requirement with SSSC (Scottish Social Service Council) that all leaders and managers who are in charge of EY centres, nurseries or family centres must have a Level 9 qualification ( SCQF) which is equivalent to an ordinary degree.

Pay within the Early Years sector is however is often only half that of a Newly Qualified Teacher, often paid little more than minimum wage.

== See also ==
- Qualified Teacher Status
- Childhood Practice
