= RTPS =

RTPS may refer to:

- Real-Time Publish-Subscribe protocol, a Data Distribution Service protocol for computer systems
- Raichur Thermal Power Station, in Karnataka, India

== See also ==
- RTP (disambiguation)
