= Eureka Online College =

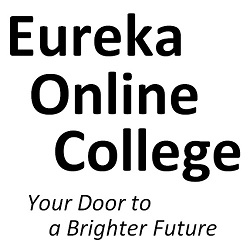
- Website: www.eurekaonlinecollege.co.uk

Eureka Online College (EoC) was founded in 2012, initially to provide online CPD for teachers specializing in science and maths. It has since grown and in 2015 had its subject knowledge enhancement courses listed on the NCTL website, benefitting preITT students throughout the UK studying with either SCITT providers or universities.

The college has been involved in "Subject Knowledge Enhancement" (SKE), the UK government initiative to help increase the number of teachers in the subjects that experience staff shortage. SKE courses are offered to college graduates who would like to study such subjects as biology, chemistry, physics, maths, computing or geography.

EOC has been using Blackboard Learn, a VLE program used to host and deliver EOC courses and providing students with access to the learning material. Online lessons are hosted via Cisco's meeting platform and Blackboard Collaborate.
