= PGDE =

PGDE stands for:

- Postgraduate Diploma in Education, in several countries including Tanzania, Australia, Ghana, New Zealand, Republic of Ireland, Scotland, Hong Kong, Singapore and Zimbabwe
- Professional Graduate Diploma in Education, in Scotland
