= Southwark Free School =

School in Bermondsey, London, England

Coordinates: 51.48143°N 0.06201°W

Southwark Free School was a free school for pupils aged 4–11, that was opened in 2012 against local advice in Bermondsey, in the London Borough of Southwark, in the United Kingdom. It attracted a maximum of 60 children and closed abruptly in February 2017.

== History ==
=== The proposal ===
Using Section 9 of the Academies Act 2010, that allowed proposers with parents to open new school an application was made in 2012 to open a two form entry, 3–11, non-selective and non denominational primary school. Initially it would be on a temporary site with an intake of 30 reception class children. It would then move into permanent accommodation and by 2018 would have a capacity of 420 places with an attached 60 place nursery.

They planned to establish the permanent site in the South Bermondsey Ward in Central Southwark in a new residential and retail development project on Rotherhithe New Road.

The Department of Education did a formal assessment of the application and the impact it would have on neighbouring schools. It concluded that seven schools would lose some pupils to the new school: Camelot, Ilderton, St Georges, Gloucester, Rotherhithe, Phoenix and Peckham Park.

Demand for primary places in Southwark was forecast to grow by 18.4% between 2012 and 2017.

Numbers of primary pupils on roll in Southwark
2010/11 Actual	2012/13 Forecast	2013/14 Forecast	2014/15 Forecast	2015/16 Forecast	Increase in primary population 2010/11 – 2015/16
20402	21897	22710	23454	24150	18.4%

Southwark Council explained that "although demand for primary places in Southwark is growing, particularly in the south of the borough it has invested in a combination of temporary and permanent places from September 2012 to meet this need. In the north of the borough, deficit of places has been dealt with by the temporary expansion of three primaries and only one of six schools most local to the proposed Free School site was oversubscribed. The Southwark Council therefore does not believe that there is a need for this Free School." (Note: The LA has made a commitment to guarantee every child who wants a place at a local primary school which it plans to achieve through strategic place planning.)

=== Planning application ===
A planning application 13/AP/0065 was submitted for a mixed development of private housing and affordable housing at 399 Rotherhithe New Road, on the former industrial estate. There were to be 158 flats in two buildings. One would be six storeys, and the other a 61.3m, 19 storeys tower block. Southwark Free School would have 2,210 sq.m. of floorspace on the ground and first floors. City of London Academy would have 2,210 sq.m. of space at the other end of the site and access to a Multi-usage Games Area (MUGA) in the basement.

In 2013, Southwark Council rejected the planning application on the grounds of over-intensive development, and usage contrary to the Southwark Plan. The Mayor of London, Boris Johnson, intervened. The mayor saw this as an important test of London Plan policy 3.18B-F. He overturned the planning decision.

The school proposal was supported by Simon Hughes, the local MP. Mr Hughes had received a £5,000 donation from Southwark Metals – a company associated with the school's developer which he failed to declare. This was subsequently investigated by the Parliamentary Standards Committee, he admitted that this was an error on 7 November 2013: MPs found that he had not broken any parliamentary rules with regards to lobbying.

=== Temporary accommodation ===
The school failed to attract pupils, or qualified staff.

The school remained in temporary accommodation housed in at the Ledbury community hall and temporary cabins near the Old Kent Road.

=== Closure ===
In the autumn term in 2016, there was one full-time teacher. She left in December 2016, when the school refused to give her a permanent contract with the conditions of service (holiday pay, maternity leave etc.) that qualified teachers are entitled to. Parents of the 56 pupils at Southwark free school were told in January 2017 that the school would close by mid February. They were all found places in other schools by the Southwark local authority and the EFA.

This is the sixth Department for Education (DfE) free school to close. There are 429 free schools in total (December 2016), and over 100 of them are in temporary or makeshift accommodation. Over 200 of them have been in temporary accommodation at some point over the last seven years.

== Admissions policy ==
All schools are required to have an admissions policy for when they are oversubscribed. There are similar to the one that Southwark Free School proposed.

1. children in care;
2. children whose acute medical and social needs justify the allocation of a place in the school;
3. brothers and/or sisters of pupils attending the Southwark Primary Free School at the time of the proposed admission (living at the same address)
4. applicants living nearest the school by straight line distance
