= GTCS =

GTCS may refer to:

- Generalized tonic–clonic seizure, a type of seizure
- General Teaching Council for Scotland
