= General council =

General council may refer to:

== Education ==
- General council (Scottish university), an advisory body to each of the ancient universities of Scotland
- General Council of the University of St Andrews, the corporate body of all graduates and senior academics of the University of St Andrews

== Medicine ==
- General Dental Council, a United Kingdom organisation which regulates all dental professionals in the country
- General Medical Council, the regulator of the medical profession in the United Kingdom
- General Optical Council, an organisation in the United Kingdom that regulates opticians and optometrists

== Politics and government ==
- Crow Tribal General Council, a tribal assembly comprising all enrolled members of the Crow Nation
- General Council of Bucharest, the legislative body of the Municipality of Bucharest
- General councils of France, the legislative bodies of the departments of France, which since March 2015 are officially called Departmental Councils (French: Conseils départementaux, sing. Conseil départemental)
- General Council of the Judicial Power of Spain, the autonomous institution which governs all the judicial instances of Spain
- General Council of Mayotte, a legislature
- General Council of Saint-Pierre and Miquelon, a dependency legislature
- General Council of Scotland, late 14th century - early 16th century, a sister institution to the Scots Parliament
- General Council (Andorra), the unicameral parliament of Andorra
- Grand and General Council, the parliament of San Marino

== Trade ==
- General Council (TUC), a decision body of the Trades Union Congress which meets every two months
- General Council (WTO), the highest decision-making body after the Ministerial Conference in the World Trade Organization

== Religion ==
- General council (Christianity), a meeting of the bishops of a whole church convened to discuss and settle matters of church doctrine
- General Council of the Assemblies of God, the formal name of a Pentecostal denomination.
- General Council of the Evangelical Lutheran Church in North America, in existence from 1867 to 1918

== Other ==
- General Social Care Council, a public body which has responsibility for registering and regulating social workers and social care workers

== See also ==
- General Teaching Council (disambiguation)
- General counsel
