= List of Teachers (British TV series) characters =

This article is a list of characters from the British TV series Teachers.

Actor	Series	Character Name	Subject	Character Description
Andrew Lincoln	1–2, 3	Simon Casey	English	The focus of the first series. Regularly clashed with department head Bob over his laid back approach to teaching, and also with fellow English teacher Jenny, with whom he ends up having sex, and eventually became friends with in the second series. He is shown to be less than fervent about most aspects of his job, often giving similar excuses for his lack of work that the pupils give for not doing homework. He was good friends with Brian and Kurt but his best friend was Susan. She helped him through most of his problems, and he expressed deep remorse for not being there for her in episode 6 of series 1. He becomes attracted to her in one episode of the 2nd series but the two still maintain their closeness. He left before the end of that series to go travelling in South America. He returned briefly in series 3 where he acted as a supply teacher for three episodes, where he admitted that he spent his time "travelling" at his Dad's house in Bristol. The actor also directed some of the show's episodes.
Adrian Bower	1–3	Brian Steadman	Physical education, Geography	A PE teacher originally; later became a geography teacher. Chided for his Northern accent and generally perceived to be a little dim-witted. Mysteriously killed off between the 3rd and 4th series, apparently in a car crash (Brian's car) which kills him, Kurt and Matt. Lindsay, Penny and Bob later visit their graves in episode 1 of series 4.
Navin Chowdhry	1–3	Kurt McKenna	Information technology	Dated the secretary Carol briefly. Generally more intelligent than Brian. Sometimes taunted for being of short stature. Quit smoking when he was trying to woo a parent, very desperate to have sex with anyone. Also killed off between the 3rd and 4th series, apparently in a car crash involving Matt.
Raquel Cassidy	1–2	Susan Gately	Psychology	Separated from and later divorced husband Peter. She then moved in with fellow teacher, Jenny. Acts as the group's shrink, as she is the one they go to for advice. Has a nervous breakdown in the 1st series after taking on too much administrative work. Susan appeared to be good friends with everyone and even got on with many of her superiors. Her best friend was Simon, and she acted as his psychologist most of the time. Many of the story lines in series 1 and 2 had something to do with their friendship, including one episode in series 2, where Simon became attracted to her. When Simon left in series 2, his last scene was with Susan, and he suggested she come with him. She declined but it became clear how close the two characters were. Disappears without explanation between series 2 and 3.
Nina Sosanya	1–2	Jenny Paige	English	The object of much discussion and desire amongst the male characters, Jenny had one night stands with both Brian and Simon (later suggesting Susan seduce Brian, citing her experience with him as pleasant enough). Originally distancing herself from the main group, she became one of its integral elements during the first series. Promoted to Head of Year 11 at the end of that series, she had a notable relationship with educational psychologist Alec in series 2 before disappearing without explanation between series 2 and 3.
Tamzin Malleson	2–4	Penny Neville	English	Arrived as an NQT in series 2. With a reputation for making disastrous choices in men, she had a 10-month affair with Matt, and later a relationship with pupil Anthony Millington. She has had breast augmentation, and regularly tries to manipulate her colleagues by crying in order to get herself out of trouble. Initially very unpopular with her colleagues (especially Liz), by the fourth series Penny had become a much more integrated member of the group. She ended up with pupil Anthony Millington at the end of series 4, after an ongoing affair throughout the series.
James Lance	2–3	Matt Harvey	English	Replaced Simon. Married with children, however had several extramarital affairs, including a 10-month relationship with Penny, and later a short lived affair with Lindsay. He attempts to deny his 'true' feelings for Lindsay (illustrated through his assertion that there is no love in Shakespeare's A Midsummer Night's Dream). The character was killed off between the 3rd and 4th series in a car crash.
Shaun Evans	2	John Paul Keating	Modern Foreign Languages	J. P. specialises in French, and is originally mistaken for a sixth former. He is the show's only main homosexual character and is extremely sociable with everyone. He disappears without explanation between series 2 and 3. Simon is also extremely jealous of him as he replaced Simon as the person who gets the most attention.
Vicky Hall	3–4	Lindsay Pearce	Biology	Extremely popular amongst the male members of the group, Lindsay in a sense replaced the void left by Susan. Lindsay also embarked on a brief affair with Matt after much sexual tension between the two, but as of series 4 it was revealed their relationship had ended when Matt returned to his wife, a while before Matt was killed in the car accident involving Kurt and Brian. She was also known to out drink, out belch and in general better than the boys at everything.
Lee Williams	4	Ewan Doherty	English	Head of English at Wattkins School. Mild-mannered, skirt chaser in the series. Feels sorry for Bob, who made him the subject of a hate campaign after losing his position to him when the two schools merged. Shares a flat with Damien and Ben, and may have saved Wattkins from closure by seducing the inspector. Usually this would be done by Clare, but unfortunately for her the inspector turned out to be a woman.
Daon Broni	4	Damien Waller	Food Technology	Normally sarcastic and unimpressed with the antics in the group. Likes to get Ben into slightly awkward situations from time to time. Had a crush on an inter teacher but did not really get pursued. Found out about Bob's mail-order bride and exposed the secret which led to his disgust against him. Named Bob as "bald bastard" in his mobile.
Mathew Horne	4	Ben Birkett	Religious Education	A hypochondriac. At one point thought that he would be dead after being foretold by a Ouija board as a child. Changed religion multiple times a day at one point in an attempt to please all the gods of different religions. He eventually decided it was impossible to keep them all happy and that it was best to "just ignore them."

== Supporting cast ==
- Gillian Bevan – Clare Hunter, the headmistress. Usually provides the staff with their topic of discussion for the episode (disabilities, age awareness etc.). Had a brief fling with Bob. Was renowned for her iron-like nature, as exemplified with her no-nonsense approach towards Carol and the "Come In" buzzer which sounded on the opening of her office door. Clare can often be very sarcastic and cutting, but shows another side to herself when she goes through the menopause.
- Ursula Holden-Gill – Carol Schicklgruber, one of the school secretaries. Speaks very rarely and incoherently, apart from when repeating something that Clare has said, when her impression is perfect (Series 2, Episode 5). Had a brief relationship with Kurt, and it is suggested they got back together after the second series, though they are not together in the third. Carol is pregnant at the start of the third series, and the father is unknown. The baby is born later in the series and is regularly accidentally left behind by Carol in various locations. It is eventually revealed that the baby is part Chinese, thus not Kurt's. It is revealed by Lindsay in Series 4 that the maths teacher Mr. Chong is the father. Carol's surname "Schicklgruber" is the same as the original surname of Alois Hitler, father of Adolf Hitler.
- Lloyd McGuire – Bob Porter, the previous head of English. Though initially a relatively minor character (his role in series 1 was as an authority figure who would get on Simon's back about incomplete work), by Series 3 he had developed into a main character, almost one of the gang (though he was repeatedly made fun of and generally disliked) and most of his scenes revolved around his buffoonery or foul mouth. When Summerdown and Wattkins merged at the beginning of series 4, he lost his position to Ewan, whom he loathes. He ordered a bride from Thailand (Ping), who later had sex with Ewan. Ping dumped Bob at their wedding reception. His first wife - Yvonne - left him for "the satellite installation man" in series 3. This was because she was not satisfied with their sex life, after a brief revival, due to the series 2 Christmas party.
- Ellen Thomas – Liz Webb, one of the school secretaries, known for her witty and acerbic put-downs. Her daughter, Kayla, was in Brian's class in series 2 and 3. Despite being married, she had a one-night stand with Kurt, and an intense affair with Bob for a few days after the Bonfire Night Disco. Liz sees herself as being much more powerful than she is, and tries to assert her imagined authority over the staff whenever she can.
- Jonas Armstrong – Anthony Millington, a student who has a brief affair with Penny, who originally thinks he's a teacher. He dumps her after deciding that he needs to focus on his school work, after which she tries to make his life miserable. He then mentions the affair to Liz to try to get Penny off his back, but they reconcile before any news of it gets to the headmistress. The two get back together at the end of series 4 when the school year ends because she says she will miss him and wishes for him not to go.
- Su Bhoopongsa played Ping, Bob's Thai bride. Bob and she made contact through a website in series 4. When she arrived, she had sex with Ewan in his office, without Bob knowing. Bob married Ping in the final episode, but she left him, because she only wanted British citizenship.
- Jason Boyd — Grint, a prematurely-balding student in the third and fourth series. He was frequently made fun of by the teachers in their attempts to work through the problems they face in each episode. He had an episode focused on him when he was found "wanking in a cupboard" by Damien. He is a practising Buddhist and also was seen to be a member of the 'Aryan Society' along with Carol the school secretary, in series 4 which Penny is invited to join.
- The Canteen Dwarves – Although the very first episode features tall dinner ladies, many of the school's canteen staff are dwarfs, for no apparent reason. They appear as background characters in various scenes, seldom speaking or interacting with the teaching and administrative staff. Dramatically, the Canteen Dwarves are used to perpetrate many visual jokes, running parallel to the (spoken) dialogue of the main characters, usually at the bin-yard behind the school kitchen. For example, whilst some teachers have a sly smoke between lessons, a dwarf is seen climbing out of a large industrial rubbish bin. A few moments later, another dwarf follows. The teachers appear oblivious.
- Peter England played Arnie, a pupil in Simon's class in Series 1 and returned as a sixth former in Series 2. Arnie would often be found smoking with Simon behind the school, often having to listen to Simon moan about the worries in his life. In Series 1 Arnie bribed Simon into giving him straight A's in return for taking the blame when drugs were found.
- James Corden played Jeremy Stevens, probably the smartest pupil in Simon's year 11 class. He would always worry about Simon's lack of "proper" teaching and loved being tested, much to his classmates' dismay. He disappeared after Series 1 and returns in Series 3, as a sixth former, when Simon returns from travelling and quizzes him on the places he went.
- Damien Goodwin played Alec, the school psychologist. He had a relationship with Jenny. Kurt, Brian and Simon usually came to him for advice, which didn't please Susan. Jenny broke up with him because she thought the relationship was getting boring.
- Ashley Madekwe - played Bev, a loud mouth student in series 1 whose story-lines evolve mainly around her pregnancy. She gives birth towards the end of the series with Simon delivering the baby in the school's toilets. She briefly comes back in series 2 to talk about her experiences as a teenage parent, prompting Susan to consider artificial insemination.
- Zoe Telford – played Maggie, the police officer girlfriend of Simon. Dumped by Simon in the final episode of series 1 after he slept with Jenny, she is not seen again.
- Phoebe Thomas played Cheryl Cassidy, Pauline's friend and also a year 11 pupil in Simon's class. Dumped her boyfriend following Simon's advice after he wouldn't have sex with her but later realised this was due to him catching crabs off her friend Pauline. She only appeared in Series 1 with no explanation to her departure.
- Kara Tointon played Pauline Young, a year 11 pupil in Simon's class and friends with Cheryl. Pauline slept with Cheryl's boyfriend and gave him crabs, which Brian accidentally revealed. Also "complained" when Bob stared at her breasts during French. She only appeared in Series 1 not returning for Year 13 to work for her dad in an office job.
- Liz White played Eileen, a dinner lady who spends the night with Simon and in a later episode goes on a date with Brian in series 3.
