= Bachelor of Education =

Undergraduate academic degree

A Bachelor of Education (B.Ed. or BEd) is an undergraduate academic degree which prepares students for work as a teacher in schools. A Bachelor of Education program typically lasts three to four years and combines both coursework and practical experience in educational settings. The curriculum is designed to provide foundational knowledge in pedagogy, educational psychology, teaching methodologies, and subject-specific training. Graduates of this program are equipped with the skills necessary to foster a supportive and effective learning environment for their students.

== Countries where colleges and universities award the degree ==
=== Argentina ===
Since the Educational Reform of 2006, a National Institute for Teacher Education (INFD) was established to develop a standard and coherent teacher training structure throughout the country. According to the Argentine Ministry of Education, the creation of the INFD has helped greatly to reform the previous system establishing a national requirement of a 5-Year National Bachelor of Education to work across the nation at public schools, while there are private universities granting a 4-Year Provincial Bachelor of Education with the regional application. Other harmonization measures included the standardization of academic qualifications by creating a "National Catalog of Titles and Certifications in Professional Technical Education" and a federal system of degrees and transcripts for most levels of education (excluding university education). The 2005 Vocational and Technical Education Law seeks to systematize training standards and quality assurance mechanisms in vocational education throughout the country. At the secondary level, the government is currently standardizing curricular streams nationwide – a reform that is expected to be completed by the end of 2019. Recent guidelines of Education in Argentina on compulsory education aim to decrease the dropout rates in secondary school and improve promotion and graduation rates throughout Argentina.

=== Australia ===
In Australia, a 4-Year Bachelor of Education degree combines practical/pedagogical study with a Major sequence in the academic discipline of Education. In the majority of Australian universities, there is usually 2 distinct types of the Bachelor of Education: Primary and Secondary. The subjects and degree programs are quite different in both degrees e.g. for a student studying the Bachelor of Education (Primary) the focus of their degree would lie in behaviour, children, basic literacy, how children learn etc. For a student studying the Bachelor of Education (Secondary) they would therefore be teaching roughly 11–18-year-old adolescents and their programs would have less focus on those kinds of areas by the Primary degree. Instead, the degree is based around the student's intending teaching subjects; usually 1 or 2. In NSW, these teaching areas provide the major focus for their degrees in their final years. They consist of: English, Mathematics, Science (Biology, Physics & Chemistry), Geography, History, Business Studies, Legal Studies, Economics, Society & Culture and Languages.

The longer duration of the course allows for more practical experiences and greater personal or professional development before teaching service. Most Australian State Teacher-Certification bodies require either a Bachelor of Education, or a bachelor's degree in one or two subject areas, with a Graduate Diploma in Education as a minimum. A B.Ed. is not to be confused with the lesser degree Bachelor of Teaching, which is usually an 'End-On' course similar but slightly longer than a Graduate Diploma in Education.

A Bachelor of Education (Early Childhood) is given to teachers who focus on ages 5–8 years of age. Though this degree does not stop Early Childhood teachers teaching students who are older in Primary school, this degree is still equivalent to a Bachelor of Education Primary and noted as a "specialty" in Early Childhood. As of 2017, all teachers (with an exemption to Early Childhood Teachers) must sit the LANTITE exam (Literacy and Numeracy Test for Initial Teachers Exam) to gain their registration and prior to their 16th unit of study undertaking. However, in special circumstances this exam requirement can be waived and the select student given a passing grade.

Prior to 2016, the Graduate Diploma of Education was no longer accredited, as the label Bachelor of Education is now the complete title.

As of 2012, Early Childhood Teachers are required to learn the EYLF (Early Years Learning Framework) a framework that is based on theoretical practice and holistic teaching methods for ages birth to five years old. In Queensland, there is a framework more commonly used called QKLG (Queensland Kindergarten Learning Guide), based on the EYLF and used to teach children ages 3–6.

Note: In Australia, the term Undergraduate Degree is used to describe all degrees undertaken by a first-time university student and usually no pre-requisite tertiary level studies are required, mostly just the completion of Secondary High School. Postgraduate degrees are used to describe the degrees completed with an Undergraduate degree as pre-requisite.

=== Bangladesh ===
In Bangladesh, Bachelor of Education (B.Ed.) is an undergraduate professional degree for Hons. (4 years) and Diploma (1/2/3 years) in Education offered by the authorized Teachers Training Institutes or colleges for those aimed their profession as a teacher or as an education and curriculum specialist or as an educationalist in the government and non-governmental educational institutes or any educational organizations such as Save the Children, UNICEF, United Nations Development Programme, BFES, SSUF, ASA etc. B.Ed. degree is mandatory for the teaching profession in both of primary and Secondary school level. Without teaching profession, if anyone wants to go other professions such as education & curriculum specialist, researcher, administrator etc. in any educational or other sectors, he/she must have the minimum qualification of Hons. graduation degree in education (B.Ed. hons. degree). Every year many talent Hons. graduate students from this subject get international scholarship from well known universities of other countries like UK, USA, Japan, Australia, Canada etc. The minimum qualification required for entry into B.Ed. Hons. (4 years) course is passed H.S.C. or equivalent and for entry into Diploma (1/2/3 years) course in education is Bachelor of Arts (B.A) or Bachelor of Science (B.Sc.). The Hons. students of this subject have to read basic educational course contents as their major courses with some minor subject courses. In addition, usually for diploma (1/2/3 years) students from Arts faculty are trained to lecture subjects like history, civics, geography and languages and from Science faculty are trained to follow their lecture on mathematics, physics, chemistry and biology etc. whereas graduates from Commerce faculty trained up to lecture on accounting & finance, economics, management & marketing. After B.Ed. hons., one can continue for Master in Education (M.Ed.), M.Phil, PhD in education in some universities of Bangladesh. National Council for Education and related universities as well as their institutions is the constitutional authority to standardize courses for the educationalist and teachers in Bangladesh.

=== Canada and the United States ===
In Canada and the United States, this degree is awarded for coursework completed within a programme lasting one to five years, depending on the requirements established by the place where the province or state in which the university is located. In Canada, a B.Ed. degree is required for teaching certification.

A B.Ed. programme may have direct entry from high school; as a combined degree with another bachelor's degree (e.g., B.A./B.Ed.); or as an after-degree programme where the candidate has obtained a bachelor's degree, usually in the field in which the student wishes to teach. A good rapport or previous experience with young children or teens is also a desired characteristic of applicants.

There are several streams to a Bachelor of Education, each corresponding to the particular level of instruction. In the United States, this includes elementary school education, middle school education, and high school education. Students in the elementary education stream generally study for a Liberal Studies degree. In the high school (secondary education) stream, the student specialises in one to two subject areas. Upon completion of the degree, they will prepare and eventually sit for the state's Board of Education certification examination.

A typical B.Ed. program may include coursework in pedagogy, educational psychology, educational policy and leadership, assessment, curriculum development; and lesson planning, social justice, special education, and instructional technology.

=== Colombia ===
While the word "licenciatura" is often used in Spanish-speaking countries to refer to all bachelor's degrees, in Colombia it refers exclusively to bachelor's degrees focused on education whose purpose is to educate the student to become a teacher. These programs have autonomy in defining their study plans, within the framework of the guidelines established by the Ministry of National Education. Specifically, 5443 of June 30, 2010, and Resolution 6966 of August 2010, detail the quality standards associated with the curriculum, profiles, basic and professional competencies, mobility, teaching staff, and pedagogical practice. They are also governed by Decree 1295 of 2010, which establishes the conditions for obtaining accreditation for higher education programs: undergraduate and graduate.

=== India ===
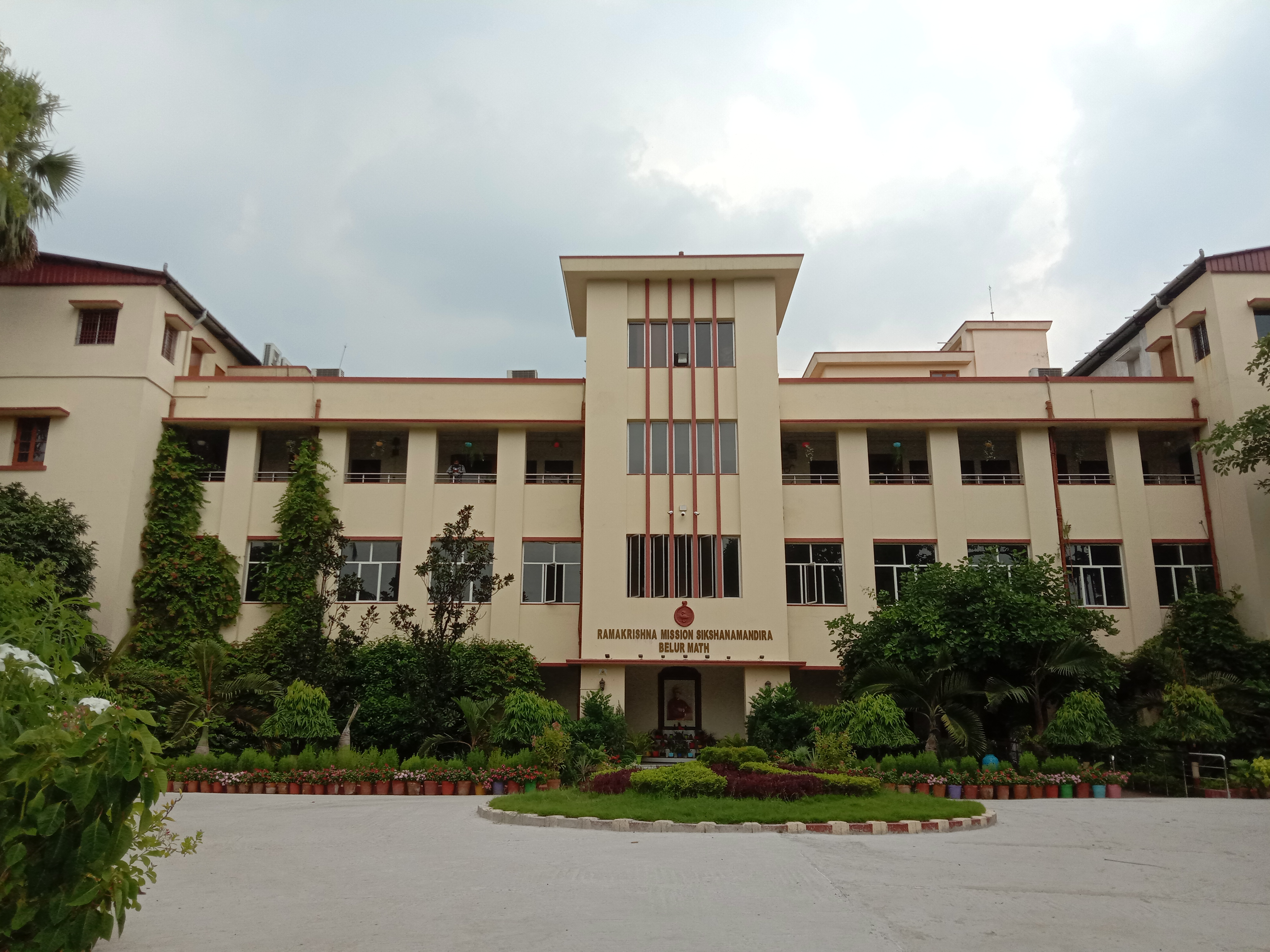
Ramakrishna Mission Shikshanamandira, in Belur Math, a renowned B.Ed. college in the state of West Bengal

The Bachelor of Teaching (B.T.) degree, once offered in India, underwent a transformation in 2002, giving rise to the Bachelor of Education (B.Ed.) degree. The eligibility criterion for enrolling in the B.Ed. course was modified in 2019 by the National Council for Teacher Education (NCTE), now requiring a graduation-level qualification (10+2+3).

The Bachelor of Education (B.Ed.) degree has become a mandatory qualification for teaching at the secondary Level (classes 6 to 10) known as TGT and higher secondary (10+2 or classes 11 and 12) levels known as PGT in India. Irrespective of their undergraduate discipline, students can pursue a B.Ed. course, which is now universally four years long and available across both public and private colleges. The Duration of B.Ed Prog after Graduation is still 2 years until NCTE announce some updates to follow New Education Policy 2019. As per Last meeting with Haryana Government, NCTE has informed that there will be no change of duration till 2030 for 2 years B.Ed Prog. Following the completion of a B.Ed., students can opt for a Master of Education (M.Ed.) program at various Indian universities or teacher-training institutes.

Meanwhile, the Bachelor of Elementary Education (B.El.Ed.) program is a comprehensive Four-year integrated professional degree course, tailored for those looking to teach at the elementary level (classes 1 to 5) after their higher secondary education. B.El.Ed. encompasses pedagogical knowledge, subject expertise, human development understanding, and communication skills, affording graduates versatile career paths.

As of a recent 2023 Supreme Court ruling, it was decreed that B.Ed. graduates are ineligible to teach primary-level students. Regardless, completing either a B.Ed. or B.El.Ed. equips individuals to offer their teaching services not only within the state and country but also internationally, given the substantial demand for qualified educators in India. Graduates of these programs can anticipate promising employment opportunities.

=== Ireland ===
In the Republic of Ireland, a 4-Year Bachelor of Education degree combines practical/pedagogical study with a Major sequence in the academic discipline of Education. Modules in the Irish and English languages are compulsory.

Students study a range of Education-related subjects, including Psychology, Sociology, History, Social Policy, Professional Practice. Students also study subjects from another field or discipline as qualification for an intended teaching area or method.

The degree is available in several specialisations, including Primary, Secondary, Human Movement/Health, Music, or Early Childhood education. The longer duration of the course allows for more practical experiences and greater personal or professional development before teaching service. Teacher-Certification bodies require either a Bachelor of Education, or an Undergraduate/Bachelor's Degree in one or two subject areas, with a Diploma of Education as a minimum. A B.Ed. is not to be confused with the lesser degree Bachelor of Teaching, which is usually an 'End-On' course similar but slightly longer than a Diploma of Education.

=== Israel ===
In Israel, the Bachelor of Education (B.Ed.) is a course offered, suitable for those interested in developing the field. Developed unique training programs tailored contemporary trends in professional training for teaching. In addition, there are plans Sitting studies of academics and teachers complete undergraduate studies. In Israel there are a number of colleges and universities offering B.Ed. studies as Levinsky College of Education and B.Sc.Ed. at The Technion – Israel Institute of Technology

=== Malaysia and Singapore ===
A Bachelor of Science Education is a degree awarded to students who complete the four to five-year course of study in the field of science (major and minor in biology, chemistry, physics, and math) with major Educational courses. It is the combination of degrees in science and education course (sometimes referred to double degree programs B.Sc + B.Ed. = B.Sc.Ed.). Even though B.Sc and B.Ed. are notionally two degrees, they must be taken together. There are very few universities that offer this course because it requires collaboration between the Faculty/School of Science and that of Education, to ensure that the teacher not only can work in an education institution but also in an industrial area related to science.

In Malaysia, it is one of the most difficult admittance degrees for the students to get into. Students not only need a distinction result but also need to go through a psychology test, rigorous interviews and demos of teaching. Students who already get these courses will be given a full scholarship by the Minister of Education. Upon graduation, the students will get job offers from government and private institutions (mostly to teach for matriculation, foundation or high school students) due to deep understanding of specific science and professional teaching training. Graduates also can work in other science related industries. Bachelor of Science and Education is totally different from Bachelor of Science in Education.

In Singapore, the National Institute of Education, an autonomous institute of Nanyang Technological University, offers a four-year undergraduate programme, offering B.Sc.(Ed.) or B.A.(Ed.) in its initial teacher training programmes. Students are taught pedagogical theories and principles, alongside their chosen subject majors (and minors).

=== New Zealand ===
The 3-year Bachelor of Education prepares graduates to teach in early childhood centres, primary, intermediate schools and secondary schools. With the Bachelor of Education one can specialise in Primary, Early Childhood, Physical Education and Huarahi Māori. The qualification is designed to equip students with the skills and knowledge they need to be effective teachers, and to gain provisional registration with the New Zealand Teachers Council. Teaching practicums allow students to gain invaluable experience in diverse education settings as they study. The Bachelor of Education can lead on to further postgraduate study.

=== Nigeria ===
In Nigeria, the Bachelor of Education degree is awarded at universities and colleges of education across the nation as a first degree. There are a few specialised universities of education in the country that exist to train teachers professionally. Some of these specialised universities include Tai Solarin University of Education and Ignatius Ajuru University of Education. The B.Ed. can be done as combined honours with a B.A. or B.Sc. It can also be done as a single honours degree with specialisations in nursery and primary education, curriculum development, educational administration and policy studies, among others. Students usually undergo intensive teaching practices at the 2nd and 3rd years of study. Upon graduation, they are registered by the Teachers Registration Council of Nigeria (TRCN) and can be employed as teachers afterwards. Postgraduate education usually take the form of an M.Ed, PGDE, and GDE.

=== South Africa ===
In South Africa the Bachelor of Education Degree is a four-year degree that qualifies a person to become a teacher, once they have registered with the South African Council for Educators (SACE).

=== Sri Lanka ===
The Bachelor of Education degree was first introduced by the University of Ceylon (Sri Lanka) in 1963. J. E. Jayasuriya, then professor of education at University of Ceylon, introduced the course to meet the growing demand for professional teacher qualifications. Then the practice was to join the teaching profession with a bachelor's degree either in arts or sciences, and after four years of teaching in a secondary school teachers get the one-year postgraduate diploma in education.

The University of Ceylon used to take only 50–60 postgraduate diploma candidates at a time in an annual program. The B.Ed. degree was introduced combining the bachelor's degree and the postgraduate diploma in education. B.Ed. was introduced as a four-year special degree and in contrast with the 9–10 3-hour papers at the final degree examination, a B.Ed. degree required a candidates to sit for 19–20 papers for the finals. This happened due to combining of the bachelor's degree and the postgraduate diploma in education. Only the top-performing students were admitted to B.Ed. degree at University of Ceylon, Peradeniya. The first batch graduated in 1967. Following this Australia introduced the B.Ed. degree. Upali M Sedere was the first first-class holder of the B.Ed. degree from University of Ceylon, Peradeniya in 1969. Subsequently, in 1973, the B.Ed. program at the University of Sri Lanka changed in its scope and character.

=== United Kingdom ===
In the United Kingdom, where both the university system and school system are very different, the degree is awarded after a three- or four-year course (the course length depends on the university) which is specifically tailored to either primary education or for a limited range of secondary education subjects. It leads to Qualified Teacher Status (QTS) in England and Wales and is a teaching qualification in Scotland and Northern Ireland.

As a result of the Robbins Report on higher education (1963), the teacher training colleges were reformed as Colleges of Education. Such colleges, as in the case of those in London, became 'constituent colleges' of the Institute of Education, with their academic award being from the University of London. Students were offered an extra year of study, bringing the course up to four years in length and resulting in the award of the Bachelor of Education degree. The first Bachelors of Education graduated in 1968.

The BEd became more widespread in the early 1980s, when a bachelor's degree became a requirement for new teachers in the whole of the United Kingdom, replacing the old Certificate in Education (Cert Ed).

The BEd is not the only way of gaining Qualified Teacher Status or gaining a teaching qualification. Other routes are as follows:

Country	First degree	Teaching qualification	Sector
England and Wales	-	Bachelor of Education	Primary and Secondary
England and Wales	Bachelor of Arts	Postgraduate Certificate in Education or Graduate Teacher Programme	Primary and Secondary
England and Wales	Bachelor of Science	Postgraduate Certificate in Education or Graduate Teacher Programme	Primary and Secondary
England and Wales	-	Bachelor of Arts with QTS	Primary and Secondary
England and Wales	-	Bachelor of Science with QTS	Secondary
Northern Ireland	-	Bachelor of Education	Mainly Primary
Northern Ireland	Bachelor of Arts	Postgraduate Certificate in Education	Primary and Secondary
Northern Ireland	Bachelor of Science	Postgraduate Certificate in Education	Primary and Secondary
Scotland	-	Bachelor of Education	Mainly primary
Scotland	Master of Arts or Bachelor of Arts	Professional Graduate Diploma in Education	Primary and Secondary
Scotland	Bachelor of Science	Professional Graduate Diploma in Education	Primary and Secondary
Scotland	-	Master of Arts (Concurrent)	Secondary
Scotland	-	Bachelor of Science (Concurrent)	Secondary

== See also ==
- Master of Education
