= Harold W. McGraw Prize in Education =

Harold W. McGraw Prize
- Awarded for: Outstanding contributions to Pre-K-12, higher education, and learning science research.
- Presented by: McGraw-Hill Education and University of Pennsylvania, Graduate School of Education
- First award: 1988
- Website: http://www.mcgrawprize.com

The Harold W. McGraw, Jr. Prize in Education is awarded annually by the Harold W. McGraw, Jr. Family Foundation and University of Pennsylvania Graduate School of Education (Penn GSE) to recognize outstanding individuals who have dedicated themselves to improving education through new approaches and whose accomplishments are making a difference in Pre-K-12 education, higher education, and learning science research around the world. The McGraw Prize was established in 1988 to honor Harold W. McGraw, Jr.'s lifelong commitment to education and literacy. In 2020 McGraw-Hill Education formed a partnership with Penn GSE to manage the annual McGraw Prize program.

McGraw Prize winners are chosen over three rounds of judging, including review by independent researchers and Penn GSE faculty, staff, students, and alumni with expertise in education. A distinguished jury of peers reviews a shortlist of Finalists and recommends one Honoree in each category to win the McGraw Prize in Education. The Prize includes three categories: Pre-K-12, higher education, and learning science research. In addition to an award of $50,000, each McGraw Prize winner receives a prize sculpture, designed and created by Miami-based sculptor Gary Traczyk.

Past honorees include: CEO of EdX Anant Agarwal; superintendent of Miami-Dade school district Alberto M. Carvalho; CEO of the Afghan Institute of Learning Sakena Yacoobi; founder of Khan Academy Sal Khan; former U.S. Secretary of Education Richard Riley; former U.S. Secretary of Education Rod Paige; James B. Hunt, Jr., former Governor of North Carolina; Ellen Moir, co-founder and executive director, New Teacher Center at the University of California, Santa Cruz; James P. Comer, M.D., Maurice Falk Professor of Child Psychiatry, Yale University Child Study Center; Christopher Lehmann, Founding Principal, Science Leadership Academy; Mary E. Diaz, Ph.D., Dean of Education, Alverno College; Christopher Cerf, a key creative force behind Sesame Street; Dennis Littky, co-founder and co-director of The Big Picture Company, The Met School and College Unbound; and Barbara Bush, founder of the Barbara Bush Foundation for Family Literacy and former First Lady.
