= Dennis Littky =

American former principal

Dennis Littky is the co-founder and co-director of The Big Picture Company, The Met School and College Unbound, and a former principal of Thayer High School in Winchester, New Hampshire. He was the subject of the 1992 NBC film A Town Torn Apart and the 1989 book Teacher: Dennis Littky's Fight for a Better School by Susan Kammeraad-Campbell, on which the film was based. He was portrayed in the film by Michael Tucker.

In 2003, Littky received the Harold W. McGraw, Jr. Prize in Education. The following year, he was ranked fourth on Fast Company's Top 50 Innovators. In 2005, his book The Big Picture: Education Is Everyone's Business won an Association of Educational Publishers award for nonfiction.

== Early life ==
Dennis Littky was born in Detroit, Michigan as the son of Pearl (née Katz) and Herman Littky, an immigrant from Buenos Aires, Argentina. Littky’s maternal grandfather, Hyman Katz, was from Russia.
