= Henry Steele Olcott Memorial Cricket Tournament =

- Administrator: Old Boy Association of a participating team
- Format: Limited Over Cricket
- First edition: 1999
- Tournament format: One Game
- Number of teams: 8
- Most successful: Dharmapala Vidyalaya Pannipitya (11 titles)

The Henry Steel Olcott Memorial Cricket Tournament is conducted annually among the past cricketers of eight premier Buddhist schools in Sri Lanka in honour of Col. Olcott, the founder of Buddhist education in Sri Lanka. The organising function in each year is rotated among each the participating Old Boy Associations

== Beginning ==
This cricket tournament was started in 1999 following the 75th Anniversary Celebrations of Nalanda College Colombo. About this time, groups of former students from Nalanda, Dharmaraja and Ananda met informally in the evenings at the Bloomfield Cricket Club. It was during one of these gatherings that the idea of a limited over tournament among the Old Boys of the cricket-playing Buddhist Schools was proposed by the 1st Test Captain of Sri Lanka, Bandula Warnapura of Nalanda. Accordingly, the first tournament of the series was held by the Old Nalandian Sports Club on 12 December 1999 at the Nalanda College Grounds.

== Participants ==
- Ananda College, Colombo
- Dharmaraja College, Kandy
- Dharmasoka College, Ambalangoda
- Dharmapala Vidyalaya, Pannipitiya
- Maliyadeva College, Kurunegala
- Mahinda College, Galle
- Nalanda College Colombo
- Rahula College, Matara.

== Past Venues and Winners ==
Year	Host School	Champion
1999	Nalanda College Colombo	Maliyadeva College
2000	Dharmasoka College	Dharmaraja College
2001	Dharmapala Vidyalaya	Dharmapala Vidyalaya
2002	Mahinda College	Ananda College & Dharmasoka College
2003	Rahula College	Dharmapala Vidyalaya & Dharmasoka College
2004	Ananda College	Dharmapala Vidyalaya
2005	Dharmapala Vidyalaya	Dharmapala Vidyalaya
2006	Maliyadeva College	Dharmapala Vidyalaya
2007	Dharmapala Vidyalaya	Dharmapala Vidyalaya
2008	Rahula College	Dharmapala Vidyalaya
2009	Dharmapala Vidyalaya	Ananda College
2010	Mahinda College	Dharmapala Vidyalaya
2011	Ananda College	Dharmapala Vidyalaya
2012/2013	Rahula College	Rahula College
2014/2015	Not held	-
2016/2017	Nalanda College	Maliyadeva College
2018	Maliyadeva College	Dharmapala Vidyalaya
2022	Nalanda College	Ananda College
2023	Ananda College	Dharmapala Vidyalaya
