= New Teacher Center =

Nonprofit organization in Santa Cruz, United States

The New Teacher Center (NTC) is a national non-profit organization in the U.S. dedicated to strengthening the practice of beginning teachers. The NTC conducts research, develops and administers induction and mentoring programs for new teachers and school administrators, and consults with organizations, educational leaders, and policymakers throughout the United States on issues related to new educator support.

== History ==
Founded in 1998, the NTC was based at the University of California, Santa Cruz in Santa Cruz, California until 2007. It is now located in downtown Santa Cruz, California It grew as an organization out of the Santa Cruz New Teacher Project, established in 1988, as a systematic, mentor-based teacher induction model.

NTC founder and executive director Ellen Moir was a 2005 recipient of the Harold W. McGraw Prize in Education.
