= Michael Tucker (actor) =

American actor, author, and producer (born 1945)

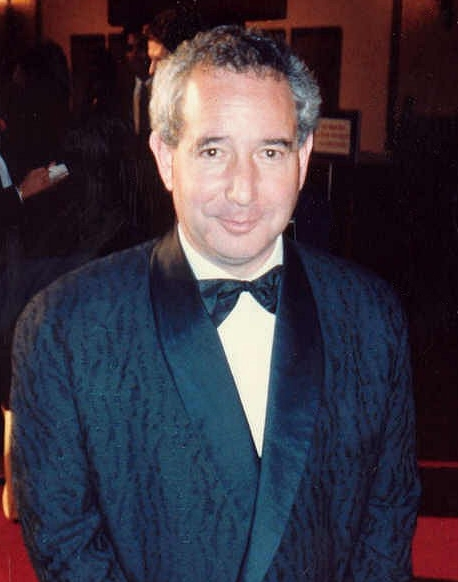
- Tucker at the 39th Primetime Emmy Awards in 1987
- Born: February 6, 1945 (age 81); Baltimore, Maryland, U.S.
- Education: Baltimore City College; Carnegie Mellon University
- Occupations: Actor, author
- Years active: 1970–present
- Spouse: Jill Eikenberry (m. 1973)
- Children: 2

Michael Tucker (born February 6, 1945) is an American actor, author, and playwright. He is best known for his role in the television series L.A. Law (1986–1994), for which he received two Golden Globe nominations and three Primetime Emmy Award nominations.

== Career ==
Tucker's acting experience includes early appearances with Joseph Papp and a major stint at the Arena Theatre, in Washington, D.C. He also has worked with Lina Wertmüller, Woody Allen, and Barry Levinson.

Tucker co-starred in L.A. Law as Stuart Markowitz along with his wife, Jill Eikenberry, who portrayed the character Ann Kelsey.

== Writing ==
Tucker has written several books, including Living in a Foreign Language: A Memoir of Food, Wine, and Love in Italy, which describes his buying a house in a small Italian village and mastering the fine art of Italian cooking. He is the author of Notes From A Culinary Wasteland, a blog about food, travel and the good life.

In March 2015 Tucker co-starred with Eikenberry in The M Spot, a play written by Tucker and presented at the New Jersey Repertory Company.

He wrote the dramedy Fern Hill, of which a production starring Eikenberry, directed by Nadia Tass, was performed by New Jersey Repertory Company in Philadelphia in August 2018, and then at 59E59 Theaters in September 2019.

== Other activities ==
Both Tucker and Eikenberry are active in fund-raising for breast cancer research and treatment.

== Personal life ==
After meeting artist Emile Norman, Eikenberry and Tucker purchased land from him to become his neighbors in Big Sur, California. In 2006, they produced a PBS documentary entitled Emile Norman: By His Own Design.

== Filmography ==
- 1971: They've Killed President Lincoln
- 1978: A Night Full of Rain
- 1978: An Unmarried Woman as Fred
- 1978: Eyes of Laura Mars as Bert
- 1979: Vampire as Christopher Bell
- 1981-1984: Hill Street Blues as Gabe Fimpel / Mr. Heidel
- 1982: Diner as "Bagel"
- 1984: The Goodbye People
- 1985: The Purple Rose of Cairo as Gil's Agent
- 1982-1986: Toys "R" Us commercials and The Animal Alphabet as Geoffrey the Giraffe (voice)
- 1986-1994: L.A. Law as Stuart Markowitz
- 1987: Assault and Matrimony as Edgar
- 1987: Radio Days as Father
- 1987: Tin Men as "Bagel"
- 1988: Mickey's 60th Birthday as Stuart Markowitz
- 1988: Checking Out as Harry Lardner
- 1989: Day One as Leo Szilard
- 1989: The Tracey Ullman Show as Jo-Jo's Father
- 1990: Casey's Gift: For Love of a Child as Peter Ctilwell
- 1990: Too Young to Die? as Buddy Thornton
- 1990: The Secret Life of Archie's Wife
- 1991: In the Nick of Time as Ben Talbot
- 1992: A Town Torn Apart as Dennis "Doc" Littky
- 1993: Tracey Ullman Takes on New York as Harry Rosenthal
- 1993: For Love or Money as Harry Wegman
- 1994: D2: The Mighty Ducks as Don Tibbles
- 1996, 1998-1999: Tracey Takes On... as Harry Rosenthal
- 1997: 'Til There Was You as Saul Moss
- 2000: Growing Up Brady as Sherwood Schwartz
- 2002: L.A. Law: The Movie as Stuart Markowitz
- 2009: Cold Souls as Theater Director
- 2010: Law & Order as Nelson Lehman
- 2023: East New York as Sy Somers

== Plays ==
- 2015: The M Spot
- 2018: Fern Hill
- 2023: A Tailor Near Me

== Books ==
- 1995: I Never Forget a Meal: An Indulgent Reminiscence
- 2007: Living in a Foreign Language: A Memoir of Food, Wine, and Love
- 2009: Family Meals: Coming Together to Care for an Aging Parent
- 2012: After Annie: A Novel

== Productions ==
- 2006: Emile Norman: By His Own Design - PBS documentary produced with wife Jill Eikenberry
