= James P. Comer =

American physician

- Born: James Pierpont Comer; September 25, 1934 (age 92); East Chicago, Indiana, U.S.
- Education: Indiana University; Howard University; University of Michigan; Yale University
- Organizations: American Medical Association, National Medical Association, American Orthopsychiatric Association, American Psychiatric Association, American Academy of Child Psychiatry, National Association of Mental Health (Mind (charity)), Society of Health and Human Values, Associates for Renewal in Education, National Association for the Advancement of Colored People
- Awards: The Heinz Awards in the Human Condition (1997), John & Mary Markle Scholar in Academic Medicine, Outstanding Service to Mankind Award, Ebony Success Library Award, Distinguished Alumni Award, Howard University, Rockefeller Public Service Award, Solomon Carter Fuller Award; Harold W. McGraw Prize in Education, Vera Poster Award

James Pierpont Comer (born September 25, 1934) is currently the Maurice Falk Professor of Child Psychiatry at the Yale Child Study Center and has been since 1976. He is also an associate dean at the Yale School of Medicine. As one of the world's leading child psychiatrists, he is best known for his efforts to improve the scholastic performance of children from lower-income and minority backgrounds which led to the founding of the Comer School Development Program in 1968. His program has been used in more than 600 schools in eighty-two school districts. He is the author of ten books, including the autobiographical Maggie’s American Dream: The Life and Times of a Black Family, 1988; Leave No Child Behind: Preparing Today's Youth for Tomorrow's World, 2004; and his most recent book, What I Learned in School: Reflections on Race, Child Development, and School Reform, 2009. He has also written more than 150 articles for Parents (magazine) and more than 300 articles on children's health and development and race relations. Dr. Comer has also served as a consultant to the Children's Television Workshop (Sesame Workshop) which produces Sesame Street and The Electric Company (1971 TV series). He is a co-founder and past president of the Black Psychiatrists of America and has served on the board of several universities, foundations, and corporations. He has also lectured and consulted widely not only across the United States at different universities, medical schools, and scientific associations, but also around the world in places such as London, Paris, Tokyo, Dakar, Senegal and Sydney, Australia. For his work and scholarship, Dr. Comer has been awarded 47 honorary degrees and has been recognized by numerous organizations.

== Biography ==
=== Early life and education ===
Comer was born into a working-class family in East Chicago, Indiana. He is the second oldest of five children: Louise, Norman, Charles, and Thelma. His father Hugh worked in a steel mill factory while his mother Maggie was a stay-at-home mom. Although his parents had little education themselves, they strongly supported their children's education. Student government was where Comer shined. In junior high he was elected one of the three councilmen to represent his four-fifths white class in seventh grade. As a freshman in high school he made the chorus. The choral club was fully integrated by the time he was senior and he was elected president of the organization. He was also elected to student council all six years. He was student council president his sophomore year and student manager his senior year. Comer finished high school in the top three percent of a three-hundred-plus class. Comer started college in 1952 at Indiana University. He was a pledge of one of the only three black fraternities on campus, Alpha Phi Alpha. During his sophomore year he became vice-president of the fraternity and became president his following junior year. During second semester of his junior year he interviewed before the medical school admissions board but was not admitted. After being interviewed for the second time his senior year, he was then admitted to the Indiana University School of Medicine. He graduated in 1956 with a Bachelor of Arts, attending both Indiana University Bloomington and Northwest.

Three years later in 1959, he married Shirley Arnold. They had two children together. Instead of attending the Indiana University School of Medicine, he decided to go to the predominantly black Howard University School of Medicine where he received his M.D. in 1960. Because of the many social conditions he witnessed throughout time, instead of practicing general medicine, he went on to the University of Michigan to get a degree in public health where he earned his M.P.H in 1964. After completing his M.P.H, Comer completed his training at the Yale School of Medicine, the Yale Child Study Center and the Hillcrest Children's Center in Washington, D.C.

=== Career ===
In 1968, Dr. Al Solnit, the director of the Yale Child Study Center at time, asked Dr. Comer to return to New Haven to run the New Haven Intervention Project, a collaboration between the Center and the New Haven Public Schools. Dr. Comer and his colleagues worked in the two lowest-performing elementary schools in New Haven.

By combining developmental and learning science principles the team identified the most critical elements involved in staff, student, parent, school, and community functioning in school, observed their interactivity, and then codified and systematized their operation and expression in a way that led to synchronous and positively synergistic school activity. The two schools eventually rivaled the highest-income schools, had the best attendance record, and no serious behavior problems.

The Comer School Development Program (SDP) is a research-based, comprehensive K-12 education reform program grounded in the principles of child, adolescent, and adult development. Over the past 40 plus years, the SDP model has been implemented in more than 1000 schools in 26 American states, the District of Columbia, Trinidad and Tobago, South Africa, England, and Ireland.

Though a principal-led but shared management framework, organizationally and/or primarily by the school staff, organizational, management, and communication issues are pulled together in a way that promotes collaboration, assessment, capacity building, and a focus on teaching in a way that leads to the integration of student development and academic learning. By minimizing confusion and conflict in the building system through this process, educators can make sound programmatic decisions based on student behavioral, developmental, and learning needs; and intentionally prepare students for school and mainstream life success. Our outcomes suggest that when students are developing well they will learn well.

While the School Development Program helps building level participants bring about change, it has been used as a framework for system-wide reform, providing mechanisms by which school boards and district central administration can coordinate and support the reform work at each school.
