= RTMP =

RTMP may refer to:

- Real-Time Messaging Protocol, a multimedia streaming and remote procedure call protocol primarily used in Adobe Flash
- Routing Table Maintenance Protocol, part of the AppleTalk network stack
- Royal Tyrrell Museum of Palaeontology

== See also ==
- RTP (disambiguation)
