= Pannipitiya =

Pannipitiya පන්නිපිටිය பன்னிபிட்டிய
- Location within Colombo District
- Coordinates: 6°51′0″N 79°57′0″E
- Time zone: UTC+5:30 (Sri Lanka Standard Time Zone)
  - Summer (DST): UTC+6

Pannampitiya (Sinhala: පන්නිපිටිය, Tamil: பன்னிபிட்டிய) is a suburb of Colombo District. It is an area in Colombo District, Sri Lanka and is located about 15 km (9.3 mi) from the commercial capital. Pannipitiya is subdivided into a number of smaller areas.

== Areas in Pannipitiya ==
- Pannipitiya Junction - Junction which connects the Borella Road with the Old Road. The Pannipitiya post office and train station are situated here. There is a cross road from Pannipitiya town that connects it to the High Level Road (A4) which is running close by. The town has developed both on the Old Road as Well as on the High Level Road. there is a power sub station around 750 m (2,460 ft) away from Pannipitiya junction towards Colombo which serves as the power distribution center for a large region in Colombo and Kaluthara Districts. Pannipitiya junction is on the westernmost part of Pannipitiya area. Maharagama area starts just 1 km away from Pannipitiya junction towards Colombo.
- Moraketiya - Four-way junction (and nearby area) that lies on High Level Road (A4) about 500 m (1,600 ft) from Pannipitiya junction towards Kottawa. This junction is connected to Erewwala junction on one side and to Old Kottawa Road on the other side. Maharagama-Sikurada Pola (Route No. 297) and Maharagama-Erewwala (Route No.212) operate through here. Pannipitiya Dharmapala College is situated near this junction.
- Mahalwarawa - Four-way junction (and nearby area) that lies on High Level Road (A4) about 1 km (0.62 mi) from Pannipitiya junction towards Kottawa.
- Kottawa - A junction situated on High Level Road (A4) that is about 1.5 km (0.93 mi) away from Pannipitiya town towards Homagama (or Avissawella). Kottawa is in the centre of Pannipitiya area geographically and also this is the biggest town in Pannipitiya area. Most of the area's financial centres, shopping centres and banks are located here. And also this is the main bus terminus in the area. The junction connects Kottawa-Horana, Kottawa-Mount Lavinia, Kottawa-Pannipitiya, Kottawa-Malabe, Kottawa-Athurugiriya-Rukmalgama and Highlevel (Pettah-Maharagama-Kottawa-Homagama-Awissawella) roads together. There are bus services to nearby cities - Piliyandala (Route No-296,342), Mt.Lavinia (Route No-255), Malabe (Route No-336), Kiriwaththuduwa / Yakahaluwa / Thalagala (Route No-128), Moragahahena (Route No-129), Horana (Route No-280 - from Maharagama), Mattegoda (Route No-138/2 - From Pettah), Rukmalgama (Route No-138/3 - from Pettah), Athurugiriya (Route No-138/4 - From Pettah) - and also to Colombo - Pettah (Route No-138), Borella (Route No-174). There is also a police station at Kottawa. Although Kottawa is inside Pannipitiya postal area there is a separate post office opened at Kottawa town few years ago. There is also a railway station at Kottawa. The town is maintained by the Maharagama Urban Council.
- Makumbura - Four-way junction (and nearby area) that lies around 2 km (1.2 mi) from the Kottawa towards Homagama on the High Level Road (A4). This is the easternmost area of Pannipitiya towards Homagama on High Level Road. The next area is called Galawilawaththa, which is under Homagama.The Kottawa interchange of the E02 Expressway is located here.
- Arawwala - Three-way junction (and nearby area) situated on the Maharagama-Piliyandala road. This junction is connected to Moraketiya junction by the Erewwala Road (2.5 km (1.6 mi)). (Pettah-)Maharagama-Erewwala(-Bokundara) (Route No.212) buses operate through Erewwala Road. Although Erewwala is inside Pannipitiya area the most easily accessible cities from Erewwala are Maharagama and Piliyandala. Maharagama-Piliyandala (Route No-341) buses operate through Erewwala. This is the southwesternmost area in Pannipitiya. Beyond here there is Piliyandala area to the south and Maharagama area to the west and north-west.
- Ambagas-hathara - Sinhalese meaning of "Ambagas-hathra" is "four mango trees". This name must have originated by the mango trees that had grown near this junction some time back. This junction is around 1 km (0.62 mi) away from Pannipitiya junction on Pannipitiya-Borella (Route No-174) road. Maharagama-Vidyala junction (Route No.990) buses operate through here.
- Depanama - An area and small junction, around 1.5 km (0.93 mi) away from Pannipitiya town towards Borella.
- Polwaththa/Kalalgoda - Sinhalese meaning of "Polwaththa" is "Coconut Estate", although there is no major coconut vegetation nearby. This area and small junction is around 2 km (1.2 mi) away from Pannipitiya town towards Borella. This is the northwesternmost border of Pannipitiya. Beyond here on the area is under Thalawathugoda. Kottawa-Borella (Route No-174) buses operates through this area.
- Moragahakanda - An area around 700 m (2,300 ft) away from Moraketiya junction on Malabe Road (Route No-993).
- Liyanagoda - An area around 1.4 km (0.87 mi) away from Moraketiya junction on Malabe Road. Can be accessed from Kottawa junction from the other side through Kottawa-Malabe Road. Around 2 km (1.2 mi) away from Kottawa.
- Vidyala Junction - Sinhalese meaning of "Vidyala" is "School", since there is a school nearby. This is a three-way junction which connects to Moraketiya, Kottawa and Malabe. Around 2.5 km (1.6 mi) away from Moraketiya junction and 3 km (1.9 mi) away from Kottawa. This is the border of Pannipitiya on the Moraketiya-Malabe Road (better known as Maharagama-Malabe Road). This is the northernmost area in Pannipitiya. Beyond here the area is under Hokandara. Maharagama-Vidyala junction (Route No-990), Maharagama-Hokandra (Route No-994 )Maharagama-Malabe (Route No-993), Kottawa-Malabe (Route No-336) but routes operate through Vidyala junction.
- Poragodella - An area on the north to the Old Road (connects Kottawa Junction-Pannipitiya Junction). This area is adjacent to Mahalwarawa which is on the south of the Old Road.
- Hatharaman handiya (Pola Handiya) - Four-way junction on the Kottawa-Athurugiriya Road, Around 1 km (0.62 mi) away from Kottawa. Also connected to Makumbura junction (1 km) and the city of Malabe (through Vidyala junction, which is around 2 km (1.2 mi) away from here). The Kottawa-Homagama Old Road starts 100 m (330 ft) away from this junction and runs towards Homagama parallel to the High Level Road. Kottawa-Kiriwaththuduwa (Route No-128), Kottawa-Malabe (Route No-336), Rukmalagama-Pettah (Route No-138/3), Athurugiriya-Pettah (Route No-136,138/4) bus routes operate through this junction.
- Katukurunda - An area to the north of Hatharaman handiya (Pola handiya) on the Malabe Road towards Vidyala junction. Around 2 km away from Kottawa junction and 1 km (0.62 mi) away from Vidyala Junction. Maharagama-Katukurunda (Route No-996) and Kottawa-Malabe (Route No-336) buses operate through this area.
- Rukmalagama - A junction (and nearby area) situated around 3.5 km (2.2 mi) away from Kottawa on the Kottawa-Athurugiriya Road. There are several middle class housing schemes built around Rukmalagama and this area is generally considered as a good residential area. Rukmalagama housing scheme has a small bus stand which operates buses to Colombo (Pettah) (Route No-138/3) through Kottawa. There are some Athurugiriya-Kottawa-Pettah (Route No-136,138/4) buses which run through Rukmalagama. This is the border of Pannipitiya area towards Athurugiriya. Beyond here the area is under Athurugiriya.
- Malapalla - A junction (and nearby area) on the Kottawa-Homagama Old Road. Around 1.5 km (0.93 mi) away from Kottawa junction. Kottawa-Kiriwaththuduwa (Route No-128) buses operate through this area. This is the border of Pannipitiya area towards Homagama on the Old Road. The next area is called Galawilawaththa, which is under Homagama. Malapalla has a train station.
- Bangalawaththa - An area adjacent to Mahalwarawa around 500 m (1,600 ft) south of Kottawa town on the Kottawa-Horana Road.
- Pinhena - Three-way junction on the Kottawa Horana Road around 1 km (0.62 mi) south from Kottawa junction. The Kottawa-Piliyandala Road starts from this junction. Kottawa-Mt.Lavinia (Route No-255), Kottawa-Piliyandala (Route No-296,342), Maharagama-Horana (Route No-280) bus routes operate through this junction.
- Digana/Pelenwaththa - Three-way junction on the Kottawa-Piliyandala Road around 1.5 km (0.93 mi) away from Kottawa junction. Digana Road connects this junction to the Mahalwarawa junction and provides a shortcut access to the High Level Road (A4) from the Kottawa-Horana/Piliyandala Road. This is one of the southernmost parts of Pannipitiya. Area south of this is called Siddhamulla and it is a part of Piliyandala. From Kottawa, Mt.Lavinia (Route No-255) and Piliyandala (Route No-342,296) bus routes operate through Digana junction.
- Mattegoda Junction - Although Mattegoda area is outside Pannipitiya (Mattegoda comes under Polgasowita) the junction which connects the Mattegoda area to the Kottawa-Horana Road is inside Pannipitiya area. Mattegoda is considered as a good residential area and there are several housing schemes built up in the neighbourhood. Mattegoda scheme has a small bus stand which operates buses to Colombo (Pettah) through Kottawa junction under the Route Number 138/2. Except for this Horana-Maharagama (Route No-280) buses also operate through Mattegoda junction. This is also one of the southernmost parts of Pannipitiya. Mattegoda junction is around 2 km (1.2 mi) away from Kottawa junction. Just south of Mattegoda junction is Mattegoda area and it is under Polgasowita.
- Niyandagala/Dolekade/Hiripitiya - This area is to the south east of Kottawa town. It is to the south of Makumbura junction and to the east of Mattegoda junction. Can be accessed from Kottawa junction through Horana Road or by turning to the right from Makumbura junction on the High Level Road. Is around 3.5 km (2.2 mi) away from Kottawa junction on both routes. Bus Route No 280 (Maharagama-Horana) operates through this area.
- Brahmanagama - This is at the southeasternmost area of Pannipitiya and the far most area from the Pannipitiya junction. It is to the south-east of Niyandagala area. It is on the Kottawa-Horana Road around 5 km (3.1 mi) away from Kottawa junction and around 7 km (4.3 mi) away from the Pannipitiya junction. From here to the south is the Polgasowita area, to the south-east is Kiriwaththuduwa area and to the east is Diyagama which is under Homagama area. Bus Route No 280 (Maharagama-Horana) operates through this area. The E02 Expressway goes via this area.
- Rathmaldeniya - This area is situated towards Pelanwattha from the Kosgahahena junction on the Moraketiya-Erewwala road. The famous "Doo Daruwo" house situated towards Pelanwaththa. Maharagama-Sikurada Pola (Route No-297) buses operate via Rathmaldeniya to Pelanwattha and then onward.

Various parts of Pannipitiya belongs to different municipal councils and "Pradesheeya Sabah" (The name for local authorities) such as Maharagama, Kesbewa, Homagama.

== Pannipitiya Town ==
Pannipitiya Town is located alongside the High Level Road (A4) between the Maharagama and Kottawa. It is a mildly populated area.

== Demographics ==
Most of the population in Pannipitiya are Sinhalese Buddhists

== Important places around Pannipitiya ==
- Dharmapala Vidyalaya, Pannipitiya
- Parama Dhamma Viharaya, Pannipitiya
- Sirasa/Shakthi media broadcasting center
- Candy Factory Group
- Food & Nature (Pvt)Ltd

== Public Transport ==
=== Rail ===
Pannipitiya has three stations located within its limits.

- Pannipitiya station is located at the junction of Old Kottawa Rd and Borella Rd (Route 174). Pannipitiya flyover bridge continues above this station.
- Kottawa station is located 200m north of Kottawa junction
- Malapalla

=== Bus ===
The main bus terminal for Pannipitiya is located at Kottawa.

Bus Routes heading through Pannipitiya:

- 99 - Colombo (Pettah) - Badulla - Passara - Welimada
- 69/122 - Maharagama - Kandy
- 122 – Pettah - Avissawella – Rathnapura - Embilipitiya - Rakwana - Suriyawewa
- 124 – Maharagama – Ihalabope
- 125 – Pettah – Maharagama – Padukka – Ingiriya
- 128/1 - Maharagama - Munamalewatta
- 138 - Pettah - Homagama
- 138/2 – Pettah - Mattegoda
- 138/3 – Pettah – Rukmalgama
- 138/4 – Pettah - Athurugiriya
- 280 – Maharagama - Horana
- 308 - Maharagama - Homagama
- 138/128 - Pettah - Thalagala
- 138/280 - Pettah - Diyagama
- 138/5 - Pettah - Mullegama
- 138 - Maharagama - Athurugiriya

Bus Routes terminating at Kottawa

- Buses go via Athurugiriya Rd:
- 128 – Kiriwaththuduwa - Yakahaluwa - Thalagala (via Pola junction - Malapalla - Homagama Hospital)
- 336 – Malabe (via Pola junction) - Kottawa East - Wasalawatta - Liyanagoda - Vidyala junction -
- 336/1 - Malabe(Via Horahena)
- Buses go via Highlevel Rd:
- 129 – Moragahahena
- 138 – Pettah
  - Buses go via Piliyandala Rd:
- 255 – Mt.Lavinia
- 296 – Piliyandala
- 342 – Polgasovita - Piliyandala
- 174 – Borella

Bus Routes serving other areas of Pannipitiya but not Kottawa:

- 993 – Maharagama – Malabe (via Pannipitiya Old Road / Moragahakanda / Liyanagoda / Vidyala Junction)
- 341 – Maharagama – Piliyandala (via Godigamuwa / Arawwala / Makuludoowa / Dolekanatta / Vishwakalawa)
- 990 - Maharagama - Vidyala Junction (via Pansala Junction / Dewram Vehera / Ambagas Hathara / Weera Mawatha)
- 212 - Nugegoda - Bokundara (via Maharagama / Moraketiya Junction / Arawwala / Makuludoowa)
- 996 - Maharagama - Katukurunda (via Pannipitiya / Bogahawatta Road)
- 994 - Maharagama - Hokandara (Via Polwatta / Devala Road)
- 297 - Maharagama - Sikurada Pola (via Moraketiya Junction / Kosgahahena Junction / Rathmaldeniya / Polkotuwa)
