= QTS Skills Tests =

Teacher training tests in England

The professional skills tests, also known as the QTS Skills Tests, were computer-based tests in literacy and numeracy (and until 2012 also in ICT) which were required to be passed by anyone attempting to gain qualified teacher status (QTS) in England until March 2020. The tests must be passed before enrolling onto an initial teacher training course, such as the Postgraduate Certificate in Education (PGCE), or the Bachelor of Education (BEd).

The goal of the tests is to "assess the core skills that teachers need to fulfil their professional role in schools, rather than the subject knowledge needed for teaching," and "to ensure all teachers are competent in numeracy and literacy, regardless of their specialism."

== Information about the tests ==
The literacy test focuses on spelling, punctuation, grammar and comprehension. The test questions are randomly selected from a bank of standardised questions. The overall difficulty of the test varies, and the passmark is adjusted accordingly.

The numeracy test starts off with a section of 12 mental arithmetic questions, each with a strict time limit, though paper working is allowed. These questions are spoken through headphones and do not appear on the computer screen. This is followed by a section of 16 more complex questions, displayed on the screen, involving interpretation of statistical data and graphs, and problem solving. For this section of the test an on-screen calculator is supplied.

Candidates are restricted to one attempt and two re-sits for each of the tests. If not successful after three attempts, a candidate can make a further attempts.

Candidates whose first language is not English, or who have a recognised special need (for example, dyslexia), are granted extra time to take the tests. Special arrangements are made in the case of visual or hearing impairment, or physical impairment.

Until April 2012 there was also an ICT skills test. The areas of Information and communications technology tested were word processing, spreadsheets, databases, e-mails, the Internet, and presentation software.

== Making arrangements to take the test ==
The tests are administered by learndirect and take place in learndirect test centres around England. The first attempt at each of the tests is free of charge, but learndirect charge a fee for re-sits.

The tests are conducted on computers in supervised environments. Candidates cannot take any materials, phones, watches, etc. into the test room. Paper is provided for doing mental calculations. The tests can be taken on the same day, or at different times depending on the availability of test slots.

== Skills tests in the wider United Kingdom ==
The professional skills tests are only required for initial teacher training in England. Teachers training in Wales, Scotland or Northern Ireland do not have to take the tests. However a B grade in GCSE English and Maths is required in Wales, compared to a C grade in England.
