= J. E. Jayasuriya =

Sri Lankan educationist

J. E. Jayasuriya (14 February 1918 - 23 January 1990) was a Sri Lankan educationist. He was the Professor of Education at the University of Ceylon.

== Early life and education ==
Jayasuriya's father was a postmaster and the family moved when he was transferred from post office to post office. He received his education at Nawalapitiya Anuruddha Vidyalaya, Dharmasoka College, Ambalangoda and at Wesley College, Colombo. In 1933, he came third in the British Empire at the Cambridge Senior Examination gaining a scholarship to the University College, Colombo and graduated in 1939 with a first class in mathematics.

== Educational career ==
He accepted an invitation from P. de S. Kularatne to serve as Acting Principal of Dharmapala Vidyalaya, Pannipitiya and thereafter served as Deputy Principal of Sri Sumangala Vidyalaya, Panadura. He was then invited by the Minister of Education Dr. C. W. W. Kannangara to become the Principal of newly established central school in his electorate, the Matugama Central College. Thereafter, he served as the Principal of Wadduwa Central College. In 1947, he left to London for postgraduate studies at the Institute of Education of the University of London, gaining a Postgraduate Diploma in Education and a Master of Arts in Education. On his return, he joined the Government Teacher Training College, Maharagama as a lecturer in mathematics. In 1952, he joined the Faculty of Education, University of Ceylon as a lecturer and in 1957, he succeeded Prof. T. L. Green and was appointed as Professor of Education. In 1961, he was appointed as the Chairman of the National Education Commission. He served as the Dean of the Faculty of Arts and from time to time as acting Vice Chancellor until his retirement in 1971 to join UNESCO as the Regional Advisor in Population Education based in Bangkok. At the end of his contract he returned to Sri Lanka, where he spent his last days writing and researching. He died in January 1989. He has awarded an honorary Doctor of Letters from the University of Colombo and an honorary Doctor of Science from the Open University of Sri Lanka. He was a Chartered Psychologist.

== Books published ==
- Educational Policies and Progress during British Rule in Ceylon, 1796-1948
- Education in Ceylon Before and After Independence
- Dynamics of Nation Building in Malaysia; Education in Korea – A Third World Success Story
- Population Education through Curriculum Innovation

== See also ==
- Bachelor of Education
