= Registered Teacher Programme =

British teacher training programme

The Registered Teacher Programme (RTP) was a programme in England and Wales for non-graduates to complete a degree, and gain qualified teacher status. The programme was designed for people that had completed two years of higher education, and had gained a qualification such as a Higher National Diploma or Foundation degree.

To be on the Registered Teacher Programme, a person was required to work in a school as an unqualified teacher, usually for two years. The minimum wage for a person on the programme was £15,461, with the school getting a grant of £9,100 from the (now-defunct) Training and Development Agency for Schools to help towards the cost of employment.

== See also ==
- Graduate Teacher Programme
- Teach for America
