= RTP =

RTP may refer to:

== Organisations ==
- Rádio e Televisão de Portugal, the Portuguese public broadcasting corporation
- RTP (Bolivia), Bolivian television network
- Royal Thai Police, the national police force of Thailand
- RacingThePlanet, an organizer of endurance foot-races
- Rally of the Togolese People, a former political party in Togo

== Science and technology ==
- Radiation treatment planning, in radiotherapy
- Reinforced thermoplastic pipe, a high pressure pipe
- Return to Player is a term used in slot machines and online games to refer to the percentage of winning for the customer.
- Rapid thermal processing, in semiconductor production
- Round-the-pole flying, of model aircraft

=== Computing ===
- Real-time Transport Protocol, for delivering audio and video over IP networks
- Reliable Transport Protocol, a Cisco protocol used by Enhanced Interior Gateway Routing Protocol
- Rendezvous and Termination Protocol, part of the PARC internetwork protocol suite
- Real-time processor, processors for real-time computing purpose

== Other uses ==
- Recreational Trails Program, in the United States
- Red de Transporte de Pasajeros, in Mexico City, Mexico
- Regional Transportation Plan, in the United States
- Registered Teacher Programme, in England and Wales
- Research Triangle Park, North Carolina, United States
- Reserve Tranche Position, with the International Monetary Fund
- Ragam Thanam Pallavi, a kind of Carnatic music performance
- Real-time payment, a method of electronic funds transfer
  - Real Time Payments, bank transfer system operated by The Clearing House (PayCo)

== See also ==
- RTMP (disambiguation)
