= Professional Graduate Diploma =

Professional Graduate Diploma may refer to:

- Professional Graduate Diploma in Information Technology - An academic qualification equal to the third (final) year of a UK honors degree, awarded by the British Computer Society (BCS)
- Professional Graduate Diploma in Education - A one-year course in Scotland for undergraduate degree holders
