= Dharmapala Vidyalaya =

- ධර්මපාල විද්‍යාලය
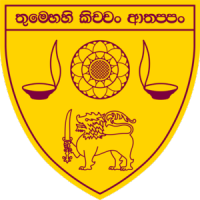

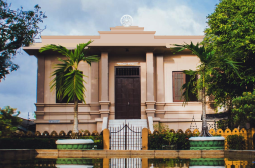
- College Shrine Room

Location
- High Level Road; Pannipitiya, 10230; Sri Lanka; 6°50′37″N 79°57′11″E

Information
- Type: Public
- Motto: Thumehi Kichchan Athappan (Buddhist quote from the Dhammapada).
- Religious affiliation: Buddhist
- Established: 8 December 1940; 85 years ago
- Founder: Patrick de Silva Kularatne
- School district: Colombo
- Educational authority: Ministry of Education
- Principal: R. A. Maheshika Rupasinghe
- Teaching staff: 200
- Grades: 1–13
- Gender: Co-educational
- Age range: 6–19
- Enrollment: 4200+
- Language: Sinhala; English
- Schedule: 7:30 AM - 1:30 PM
- Campus type: Suburban
- Color: Maroon Purple
- Athletics: Yes
- Sports: Yes
- Affiliation: Buddhist
- Named after: Anagarika Dharmapala
- Alumni: Palians
- Abbreviation: DVP
- Website: www.dharmapalavidyalaya.org
- Flag of Dharmapala Vidyalaya

Dharmapala Vidyalaya is a co-educational institution located in Pannipitiya, which was established in 1940. The school is situated on land donated by Anagarika Dharmapala, whom the school is named after. The school was upgraded to National school status in 1991.

== Location ==
The school is located in the suburb of Pannipitiya in the Colombo district, Sri Lanka, along the Colombo - Batticaloa Highway, bordered by Dharmapala Mawatha to the east, Arawwala Road to the west and a residential area to the south.

The land was originally owned by Anagarika Dharmapala and was donated by the Hewawitharana Family to the Mahabodhi Society, who allocated it to the school in 1940.

== History ==
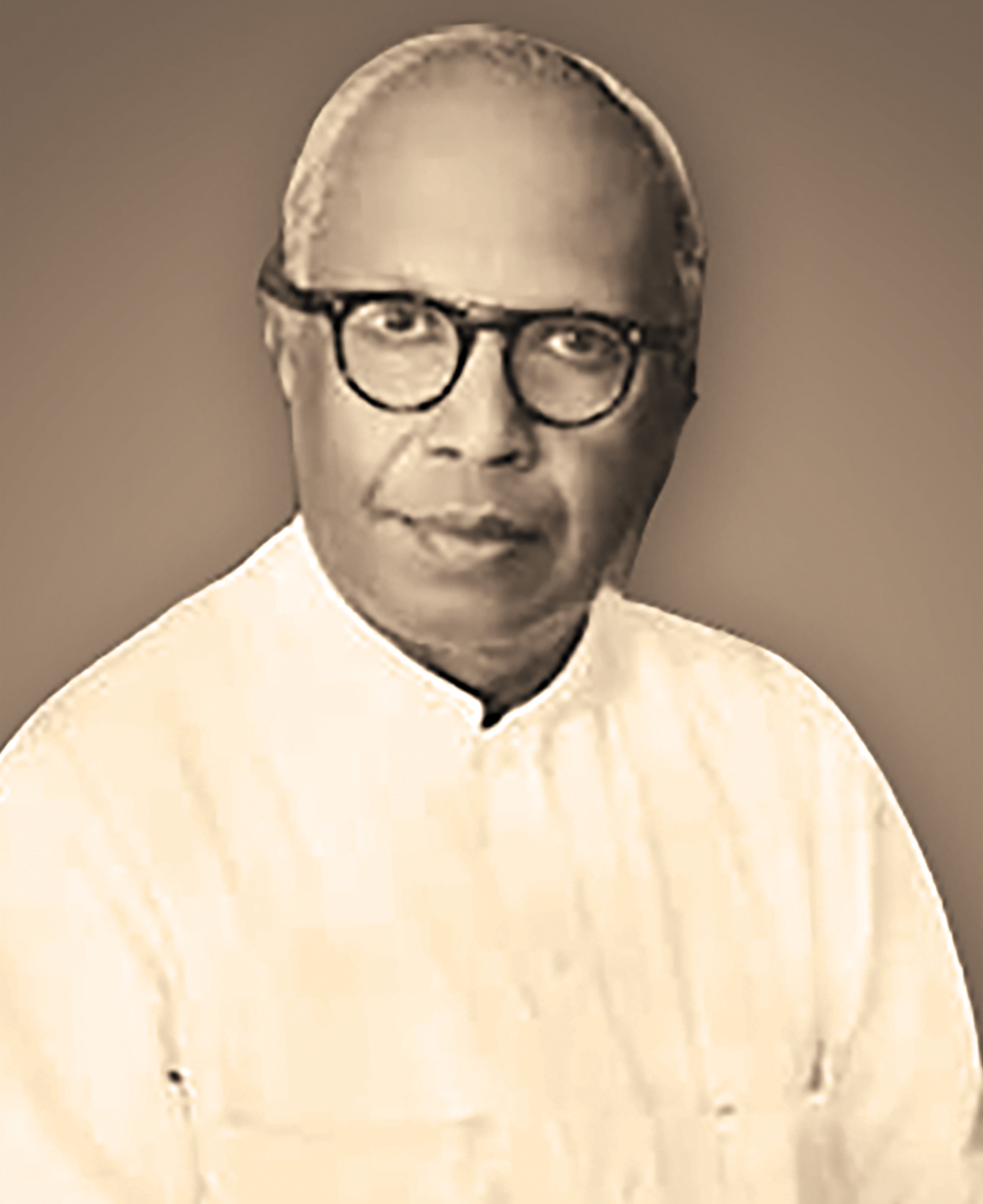
P. De S Kularathna (founder)

In 1940, an English secondary school was established at Pannipitiya, as a branch of Ananda College, Colombo, named Dharmapala College. On opening day two major events took place: the opening of Sri Devamitta Dharmapala Thero Memorial building by the Minister of Health, W. A. de Silva, and the ceremonial opening of Dharmapala College by the general manager of Buddhist Schools, Walter Wijeynaike.

Dharmapala Vidyalaya was managed by the Buddhist Theosophical Society under the direct supervision of the principal of Ananda College, Colombo. It was a school for boys and girls and conducted classes from kindergarten to the matriculation form, in English. Dharmapala Vidyalaya commenced on 8 January 1941. Its founder was Patrick de Silva Kularatne and its principal was Dr. J. E. Jayasooriy, a British gentlemen acted as the first principal of the school and was joined by several academic staff, including.

- R. L. N. de Zoysa
- E. Flesinger
- M. T. Peries
- Soma Wijesinghe
- D. D. Arangala
- H. D. D. Gunasekara
- D. A. Jayamanna

The first registered student was Somabandu Vidyapathi, who completed his education and later became a painter and sculptor.

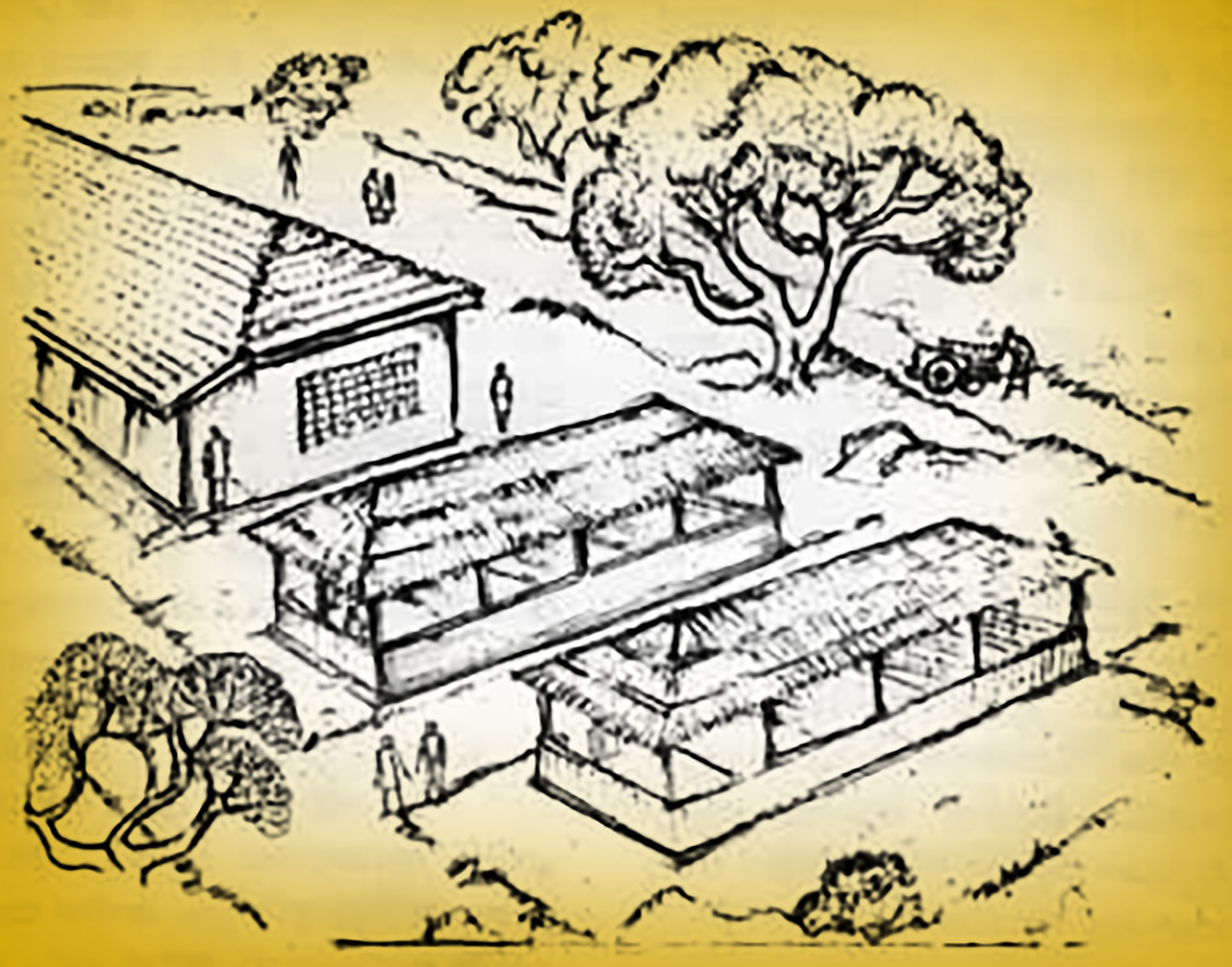
"ධර්මපාල විද්‍යාලය ආරම්භ වූ අවධියේ දී" සෝමබන්ධු විද්‍යාපති මහතාගේ රේඛා චිත්‍රයකි

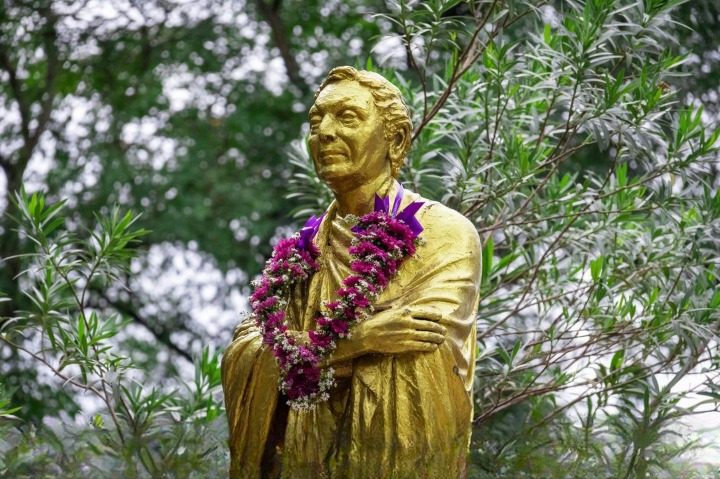
Anagarika Dharmapala statue

During World War II a section of Ananda College, along with the teachers, shifted to the Dharmapala premises due to fear of war. To accommodate these students more cadjan sheds were built. Later six permanent classrooms were built for the primary section. The then-principal of Ananda College, P. de S Kularathna, led this project. With the exit of Jayasooriya, D. C. Lawris took over as principal in 1943.

The school registered as an independent institute and a Class 1AB school for higher education. With the help of financial donors and with the money collected by the students, another five classrooms were built for the primary section.

By February 1947 there were 1,420 students and H.S.C. classes were started. Lawris left the school to take on the role as principal of Ananda College, Colombo.

== Important historical milestones ==
- 06.12.1941 1st anniversary celebrations together with the prize giving under the patronage of Sir Baron Jayatileke.
- 06.06.1951 First soccer match in the newly build ground.
- 28.10.1951 First cricket match in the ground against Mahinda College Galle.
- 25.02.1952 Issuing the first school magazine “Dhampal Vidhuhal Sagarava”
- 14.06.1962 Dharmapala College a was taken over by the government.
- 06.09.1965 25 year anniversary celebration. His Excellency Mr. Wlliam Gopallawa – Governor-General of Ceylon participated as the Chief Guest.
- 08.12.1990 Dharmapala College 50th anniversary official stamp issue.
- 07.11.2010 Earning ISO 9001:2008 quality certification.
- 28.02.2011 Inauguration of the Swimming pool by His Excellency Mahinda Rajapakse - the President of Sri Lanka.
- 06.02.2012 First Big Match cricket encounter with Rahula College, Matara at the Uyanwatta stadium.

== Current facilities ==
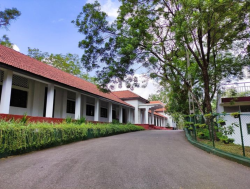
Dharmapala College Main Hall

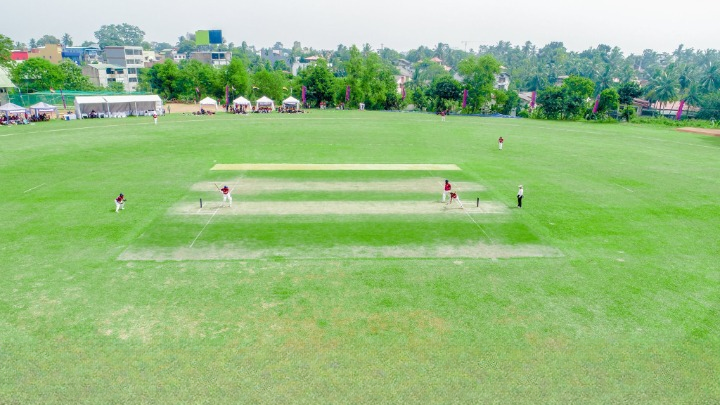
Dharmapala College Ground

The College provides education for students from grade 1 to G.C.E advanced level with a range of facilities.

=== Sports Facilities ===
- 2.0 ha (5 acres) international level cricket ground with six centre turf wickets.
- 0.40 ha (1 acre) rectangular ground, for soccer, rugby and field hockey.
- Cricket nets
- 25 m (82 ft) swimming pool with spectator and changing room facilities
- Badminton stadium
- Basketball courts with flood lights.
- Gymnastic gymnasium
- Netball courts
- Volleyball courts
- Shooting range
- Table Tennis

== Houses ==
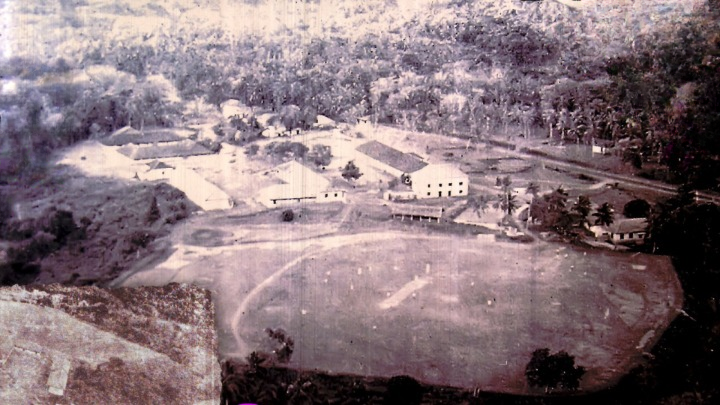
1951 - Aerial view of Dharmapala Vidyalaya

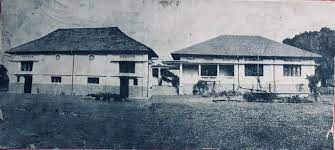
College old buildings

Houses of the college
House Name	House Colour	House Emblem
Shakya House	Red Colour	Lotus Flower
Maurya House	Blue Colour	Peafowl
Soorya House	Yellow Colour	Sun
Nanda House	Green Colour	Parrot

== Clubs and Societies ==
There are over 40 active student organisations at the college.

=== Senior Western Band- Boys ===
According to the concept of the former principal, K. G. Wimalasena, the junior western band was formed in 2007. Now it has grown as a leading senior western band among the other schools in Sri Lanka.

- Won the 1st place in the all Island Western Music Competitions (Mixed instrument category) in 2013.
- Won the 1st place in Ranaviru Sena Band competitions in 2014.
- Won the 1st place in Rhythm of J’pura indoor competitions in 2014.
- Won the 2nd place in all Island Western Music and Dance competitions in 2015. (Mixed instrument group)
- Won the 2nd place in all Island Western Music and Dance Competitions in 2017.

=== Cadet Union ===
- Winning the Herman Los cup at the highest achievement of the cadet crops.
- Received the 3rd place in the final camp of the 19th batch of 40 schools in 2013.
- The 3rd place was purchased from 2 championships and 12 official promotions.
- There are 24 guard (Sammana Mura) for the occasion and for the 1st time in the history of the school.

== Sports ==
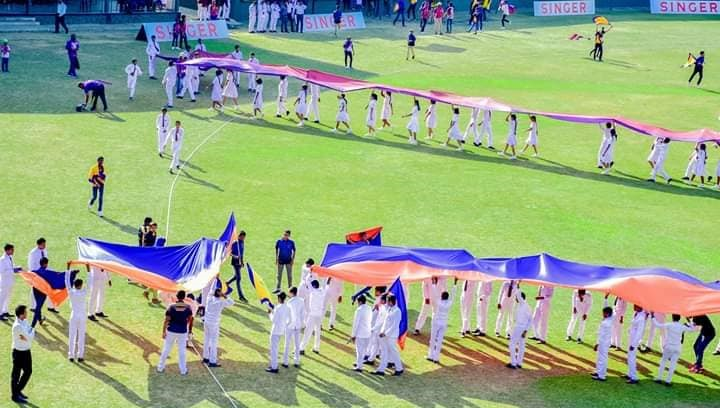
Dharmapala - Rahula Big Match

Battle of Golden Lions

The annual big match, the Battle of Golden Lions (රුහුණු -මායා සටන), between Dharmapala Vidyala and Rahula College is the major sport event in the school.

The Henry Steel Olcott Memorial Cricket Tournament

The Henry Steele Olcott Memorial Cricket Tournament is an annual cricket tournament conducted among the past cricketers of eight premier Buddhist schools in honor of Col. Olcott, the founder of Buddhist education in Sri Lanka.

== Principals ==
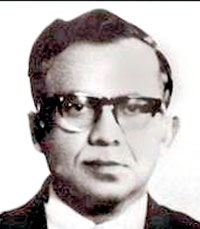
Prof. J. E. Jayasuriya - founder Principal of Dharmapala.

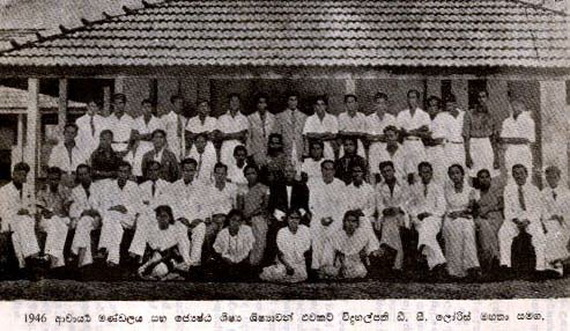
1946 - The teaching staff and students with the then Principal Mr. D. C. Lawris.

J. E. Jayasuriya was the founding Principal of Dharmapala College Pannipitiya. At the inauguration function of Dharmapala College, P. D. S. Kularatna introduced him thus: “A 22 year old energetic gentleman with the highest educational qualification has been appointed as principal of Dharmapala College. That fact itself I see as a good sign to the future development of Dharmapala College.”

Principals of Dharmapala College
No.	Name	From	To	Special Notes
01.	J. E. Jayasuriya	1940	1943	Founding principal of Dharmapala College.
02.	D. C. Lawris	1943	1947	
03.	G. C. Edirisinghe	1947	1956	
04.	R. M. Abeywardhana	1959	1960	
05.	G. B. Bannehaka	1969	1971	
06.	B. S. Gunesekara	1971	1976	
07.	N. B. Perera	1976	1981	
08.	D. C. Danapala	1981	1983	
09.	R. T. Direcksze	1983	1985	
10.	G. R. W. G. Gunawardana	1985	1991	
11.	S. H. Kumarasinghe	1991	1994	
12.	R. S. Rajapaksha	1995	2004	
13.	K. G. Wimalasena	2004	2016	
14.	Oshara Panditharathna	2016	2020	
15.	K. G. Wimalasena	2020	2021	
16.	R. A. Maheshika Rupasinghe	2022	present	First Female Principal of Dharmapala College.

== College union ==
The Past Pupils' Association (PPA) formerly operated under the name Dharmapala Old Boys Association, it was founded on 4 February 1947 under the guidance of David Silva, a teacher at the time. The first elected president of this association was G. C. Edirisinghe.

The Past Pupils’ Association (PPA) of Dharmapala College currently has a membership of over 4,500.

== Notable alumni ==
Name	Notability	Reference
Ratnasiri Wickremanayake	Prime Minister (2000–2001, 2005–2010), member parliament - Horana (1960–1977), Kalutara (1994–2010)	
Kamal Gunaratne	Major General, Secretary to the Ministry of Defence (2019–present)	
Oliver Ranasinghe	Commander of Sri Lankan Air Force (1994–1998)	
Rohan Daluwatte	Commander of Sri Lankan Army (1996–1998)	
M. P. Perera	Vice Chancellor University of Kelaniya (1973–1974, 1983–1985)	
Soma Edirisinghe	Corporate Executive (chairman EAP Holdings), Film Producer, Philanthropist	
Tissa Abeysekara	Filmwriter, Director, Producer	
Eva Wansundera	Solicitor General (2011), Attorney General (2011–2012), Supreme Court Judge (2012–present)	
Wimal Wickramasinghe	Member of Parliament - Ratnapura (1989–1994), Deputy Minister of Finance (1989–1994)	
Asoka Wadigamangawa	Member of Parliament - Puttalam (1989–2000), Deputy Minister of Lands (1989–1994)	
H. D. L. Leelaratne	Member of Parliament - Seruvila (1977–1989)	
Chinthaka Jayasinghe	former Sri Lankan cricketer	
Rohana Weerasinghe	Musician, Composer, Singer, Teacher	
Thumindu Dodantenna	Actor, screenwriter, Lecturer	
Narada Warnasuriya	Vice Chancellor University of Sri Jayewardenepura (2005–2008)	
