= SSERC =

Scottish educational charity

Scottish Schools Education Research Centre
- SSERC
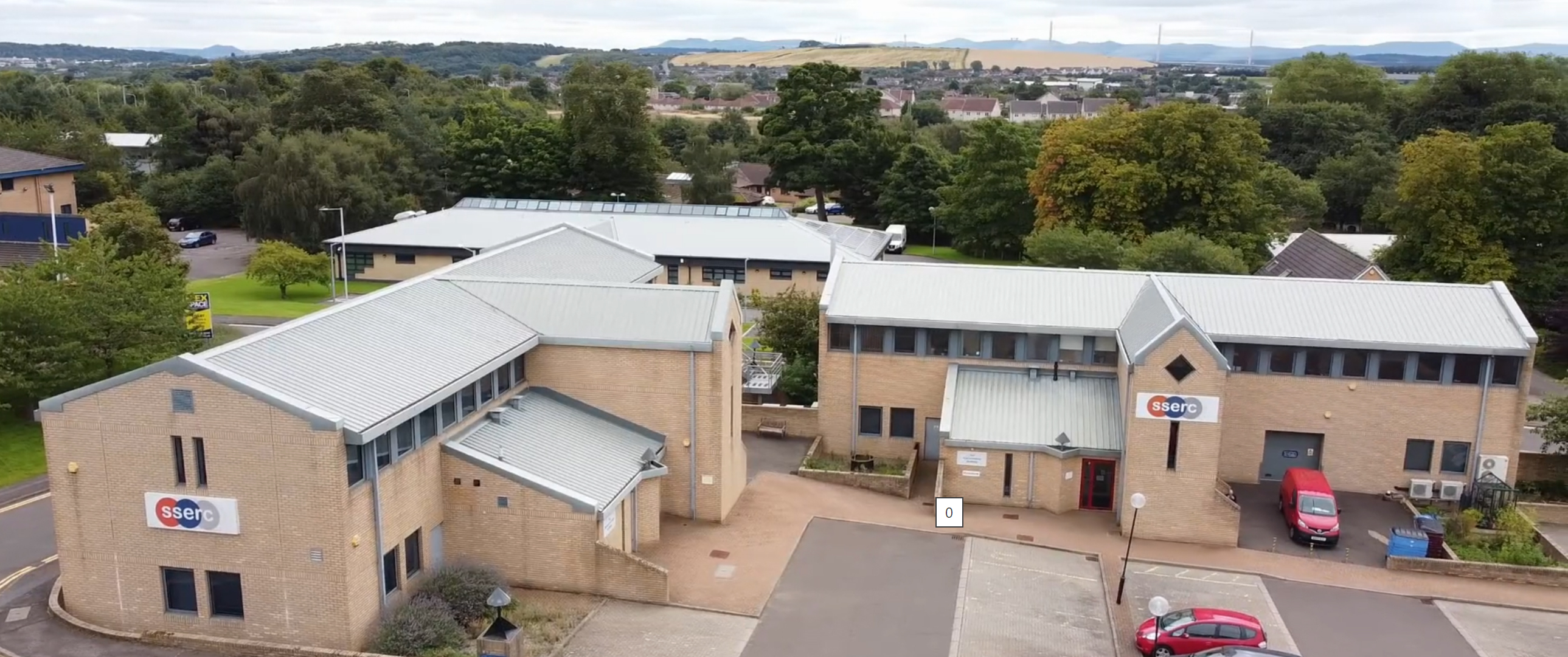
- SSERC Campus in Dunfermline, Scotland
- Formation: 1965
- Type: Educational charity
- Registration no.: SC013740 (Charity)
- Headquarters: SSERC Campus, Pitreavie Court, Dunfermline, Scotland
- Location: Scotland, United Kingdom
- Chief Executive: Alastair MacGregor
- Chair of the Board of Trustees and Directors: Alistair Wylie (Interim, from January 2023)
- Website: www.sserc.org.uk

SSERC (formerly the Scottish Schools Education Research Centre) is a not-for-profit company limited by guarantee and a registered educational charity in Scotland. Based at the SSERC Campus in Dunfermline, it provides STEM-focused professional learning, advisory services, and engagement programmes for educators across early years, primary, secondary, and technical communities. SSERC is funded by the Scottish Government, all 32 Scottish local authorities, and other national and industry partners. SSERC is accredited by the General Teaching Council for Scotland (GTCS) as a provider of professional learning for teachers.

== History ==
SSERC was first established in 1965 as the Scottish Schools Science Equipment Research Centre (SSSERC), following recommendations from a technical sub-committee of the Advisory Committee on Physics (itself formed in 1961) that an organisation to appraise equipment for use in school science lessons would benefit the Scottish education sector. Over time, the organisation remit expanded to include the issuing of health and safety guidance, provision of professional learning opportunities, and direct STEM engagement. In 1991, the organisation was formally incorporated as a charity and rebranded itself as 'SSERC' in 2008 to reflect its broader educational role.

== Organisation and governance ==
SSERC operates as a company limited by guarantee, owned jointly by Scotland’s 32 local authorities. Its Board of Directors and Trustees comprises senior education officers, representatives from local authorities, Members of the Scottish Parliament (MSPs), and education professionals. Since 2022 the organisation has awarded honorary fellowships to those within the Scottish education community.

== Campus and facilities ==
The SSERC campus is located at Pitreavie Court in Dunfermline and houses specialist training laboratories, a microbiology preparation facility, classrooms, workshops, and administrative offices.

== Professional learning ==
SSERC is a provider of professional learning to Scottish teachers and technicians through on-site, online, and outreach programmes. The organisation also works with further education colleges to deliver specialist professional learning opportunities, including blended-learning bee biology and pollinator behaviour courses developed with Newbattle Abbey College. In addition, SSERC operates an accredited centre programme, in the form of a network of colleges that serve as centres accredited to deliver professional learning courses produced by the organisation. Its programmes include courses for biology, physics, chemistry, primary teachers, and technical staff. A number of SSERC courses have been credit rated on the Scottish Credit and Qualifications Framework (SCQF), allowing participants to gain formally recognised qualifications.

== Activities and services ==
- Advisory services: Guidance to Scottish schools on practical STEM delivery, health and safety aspects of practical science and technology education activities, and risk assessment conducting. This includes the provision of a radiation protection advisory service for the handling of radioisotopes in school environments.
- STEM engagement: SSERC runs the STEM Ambassador programme, which supports industry placement schemes, and manages the Young STEM Leader programme. Since 2018, the Young STEM Leader Programme contains both informal awards and awards credit-rated by the Scottish Qualifications Authority (SQA), with awards aligned to the SCQF Levels 4–7. The Young STEM Leader Programme underwent a 2022 evaluation led by the University of Stirling, which reported that the initiative successfully developed leadership skills and increased peer-to-peer STEM engagement among participants.
- Education/industry partnerships: SSERC also operates a programme that provides opportunities for teachers and technicians to undertake placements in industry and research organisations. These placements are designed to enhance professional learning, strengthen links between education and the STEM workforce, and support the delivery of contemporary, industry-relevant STEM education in Scottish schools. SSERC has collaborated with organisations such as Ocean Winds and Leidos to facilitate these placements.

== Publications and research ==
Since the 1960s, SSERC has published the SSERC Bulletin series, aimed at educators and technicians in practical science and technology fields. External evaluations of SSERC include a review of the Primary Cluster Programme (PCP), assessed by the University of Glasgow, noting improvements in teacher skills and equity outcomes.
