= Induction (teacher training stage) =

Support for newly qualified teachers

Induction is the support and guidance provided to novice teachers and school administrators in the early stages of their careers. Induction encompasses orientation to the workplace, socialization, mentoring, and guidance through beginning teacher practice.

== England and Wales ==
Induction is used to refer to a period during which a Newly Qualified Teacher in England or Wales is both supported and assessed to ensure that regulatory standards are met. Although probation periods for new teachers had only been dropped in 1992, the Teaching and Higher Education Act 1998 introduced arrangements by which the Secretary of State for Education could bring about regulations requiring new teachers to serve a period of induction.

The following year, the then secretary of state, David Blunkett introduced an induction period under The Education (Induction Arrangements for School Teachers) (England) Regulations 1999. These regulations made it a requirement that all teachers complete an induction period equivalent to one year upon qualification as a teacher.

=== Requirements ===
Under current regulations, teachers wishing to work in maintained state schools must satisfactorily complete a period of induction. During this period, newly qualified teachers are entitled to additional support and subject to regular observation and assessment, which ensure the teachers are meeting the required induction standards.

==== Standards ====
Having achieved Qualified Teacher Status (QTS), teachers are expected to continue to meet the standards required for that qualification. In addition, they must meet the 6 criteria set out in the induction standards:

1. Seek and use opportunities to work collaboratively with colleagues to raise standards by sharing effective practice in the school.
2. Show a commitment to their professional development by
  1. identifying areas in which they need to improve their professional knowledge, understanding and practice in order to teach more effectively in their current post, and
  2. with support, taking steps to address these needs.
3. Plan effectively to meet the needs of pupils in their classes with special educational needs, with or without statements, and in consultation with the SENCO contribute to the preparation, implementation, monitoring and review of Individual Education Plans or the equivalent.
4. Liaise effectively with parents or carers on pupils’ progress and achievements.
5. Work effectively as part of a team and, as appropriate to the post in which they are completing induction, liaise with, deploy, and guide the work of other adults who support pupils’ learning.
6. Secure a standard of behaviour that enables pupils to learn, and act to pre empt and deal with inappropriate behaviour in the context of the behaviour policy of the school.

==== Support ====
In order to support newly qualified teachers in meeting the standards, a number of entitlements are guaranteed by regulations:

- a reduced timetable (of no more than 90% of other equivalent teachers)
- support from an induction tutor
- a named induction contact at a local education authority or other body

==== Assessment ====
In addition, all teachers undergoing a programme of induction are subject to assessment processes, including:

- regular observations every 6–8 weeks
- a termly review meeting
- a decision at the end of the induction period to ascertain whether the required standards have been met.

=== Restrictions ===
Induction can only be completed in a restricted range of school types. Similarly, teachers who have not completed, and are not completing, induction can only be employed in such school types under special circumstances

==== Completing induction ====
Induction can only be completed in eligible schools in the United Kingdom, Guernsey, Jersey, Isle of Man, Gibraltar or at Service Children's Education (SCE) schools in Cyprus and Germany. Eligible schools are maintained schools, non-maintained special schools, independent schools (with support from either a local education authority or The Independent Schools' Council Teacher Induction Panel, or a sixth form college under certain circumstances.

==== Teachers not completing induction ====
Teachers who have not completed a period of induction are limited in the work they can carry out in eligible schools.

Where a teacher is employed in an eligible school for at least one term, he or she must be offered, and must undertake, a programme of induction lasting throughout that period.

Teachers who have not completed a period of induction can only work in eligible schools for periods of less than one term during a restricted time-frame. This time-frame begins on the first day that such employment begins, and expires no later than four terms from that date (approximately 16 months). Teachers who have reached this point may seek an extension to this period from the relevant local education authority.

Teachers who have not completed a period of induction are eligible to work in independent schools

==== Time limits ====
As stated in the statutory guidance on induction for newly qualified teachers in England, there is no set time limit for starting or completing an induction period. The previous ruling that an NQT needed to complete the induction period within 5 years was abolished in September 2008.

== United States ==
Comprehensive, high-quality induction consists of several key elements:

- a multi-year program
- rigorous mentor selection and training
- subject-area pairing of mentors and beginning educators
- sufficient time for mentors to meet with and observe new educators
- formative assessment that assists beginning educators to advance along a continuum of professional growth.

The New Teacher Center induction model is nationally recognized in the United States for its promotion of new educator development and its impact on teacher retention and student learning.
