= School-Centred Initial Teacher Training =

Teacher training course in England

The School-Centred Initial Teacher Training (SCITT) programme is a teacher-training course in England.

The SCITT enables graduates to undertake their training within a school environment, leading to Qualified Teacher Status. Some SCITT programmes also award a Postgraduate Certificate in Education (PGCE) qualification.

The programmes cover primary, middle and secondary age ranges and candidates work in a consortium of schools within a designated region.

The entrance requirements and funding availability is the same as for PGCE courses. Applications are also made through UCAS.
