= Qualified teacher status =

Qualified teacher status (QTS) or Qualified Teacher Learning and Skills status (QTLS) is required in England and Wales to work as a teacher of children in state schools under local authority control, and in special education schools. QTS is not required at academies, free schools or independent schools. A similar status exists under a different name in Scotland and Northern Ireland.

== Gaining QTS or QTLS ==
An undergraduate degree and successful completion of a teacher training programme is compulsory for QTS recommendation. One of the main routes to achieving QTS, for those already in possession of a degree, involves undertaking a postgraduate teacher training course, such as the Postgraduate Certificate in Education or a School Direct programme. The Diploma in Education and Training leads to QTLS. There are also some undergraduate degree qualifications leading to QTS, such as the Bachelor of Education. In England only, candidates must also pass professional skills tests. All candidates must have GCSEs at grade C or above in English and mathematics, and prospective primary teachers must also be in possession of (usually) a grade C in a science subject before embarking on teacher training.

All training which leads to qualified teacher status requires trainees to train across at least two key consecutive pupil age ranges, as defined in the Secretary of State's Requirements for Initial Teacher Training. The age ranges are:

- Ages 3–5 (Early years foundation stage)
- Ages 5–7 (School years 1 and 2)
- Ages 7–9 (School years 3 and 4)
- Ages 9–11 (School years 5 and 6)
- Ages 11–14 (School years 7 to 9)
- Ages 14–16 (School years 10 and 11)
- Ages 16–19 (School years 12 and 13)

The Teaching Regulation Agency in England and Education Workforce Council in Wales, maintain all registrations, as well as issuing QTS certificates.

QTS is technically recognised only in the country it was awarded (England or Wales), but teachers can normally apply for QTS in other home countries relatively easily. QTS gained in England is automatically recognized in Wales and vice versa. QTS is also recognised by many other countries once the relevant paperwork has been completed, though many countries place a lot of importance on the route to QTS (such as requiring a PGCE, whilst not accepting the GTP). Teachers trained outside England and Wales must also apply to be awarded QTS if they wish to teach in these countries.

After having been awarded QTS teachers must normally still pass an induction period (previously called 'probation' or the 'ECT' period) – normally their first two years of teaching. Teachers who have gained QTS but have not yet completed the Induction period are known as ECTs. ECT's who fail the induction still retain their QTS, but cannot teach in state-run schools. The induction period normally lasts two years (six school terms).

=== Routes to QTS or QTLS ===
Numerous qualifications and courses can lead to QTS or QTLS:

==== Postgraduate Certificate in Education (PGCE) ====
The PGCE is a one-year course designed for individuals holding existing degrees, serving as the most common postgraduate pathway into teaching. It is hosted and overseen by a university or other higher education institution, with students dedicating a significant portion of the program to practical experience in placement schools. Additionally, completing the PGCE earns credits towards a master's degree.

==== Diploma in Education and Training (DET) ====
The DET is a Level 5 Diploma in Education and Training, comprising a one-year, 120-credit initial teacher training programme granted by a university or an accrediting body like the Learning Resource Network (LRN). Graduates of the DET can seek QTLS accreditation from the Society for Education and Training.

==== School-Centred Initial Teacher Training (SCITT) ====
A SCITT programme allows graduates to undergo their training within a school setting, resulting in QTS. Some SCITT programmes also confer a PGCE qualification. This option is exclusively available in England.

==== Graduate Teacher Programme (GTP) ====
The GTP enables candidates to gain QTS while they are employed as an unqualified teacher in a school.

Both the graduate and registered teacher programmes (GTP and RTP) have been closed in England. The GTP has been replaced by the School Direct Training Programme (salaried).

==== Undergraduate QTS routes ====
Students can enrol in a three or four-year undergraduate degree course that includes QTS. This allows candidates to obtain their QTS while studying for their degree, with teaching practice conducted throughout the entire programme. These programmes typically award Bachelor of Education (BEd) degrees, although some may offer Bachelor of Arts (BA) or Bachelor of Science (BSc) degrees.

== Scotland and Northern Ireland ==
QTS as such does not exist in Scotland or Northern Ireland. However, as is the case in England and Wales, all teachers in Scotland and Northern Ireland are required to register with either the General Teaching Council for Scotland or the General Teaching Council for Northern Ireland; the General Teaching Councils will consider only graduates with teaching qualifications (such as a BEd, PGCE or PGDE) for registration.

In Northern Ireland, a one-year Induction programme (equivalent to the NQT programme in England and Wales) must be completed.

Individuals in Scotland must complete a one-year probation period, which is equivalent to induction in England and Wales.

Those holding English or Welsh QTS (or an equivalent from another country) must apply for registration with the relevant General Teaching Council. The relevant General Teaching Council considers each case individually; even those with English or Welsh QTS are not guaranteed permission to teach in Scotland or Northern Ireland.

== Schools not requiring QTS for teachers ==
There is no formal requirement for teachers at independent schools or free schools to have QTS.

As of 27 July 2012, there is no longer any requirement for teaching staff in academies to have QTS.

== See also ==
- Early Years Professional Status
