= Education Workforce Council =

Welsh education regulatory agency

The Education Workforce Council (EWC; Welsh: Cyngor y Gweithlu Addysg; CGA) is the independent and professional regulator for the education workforce in Wales. They regulate education practitioners across schools, further education, youth work, and adult/work-based learning.

The EWC was established on 1 April 2015 by the Education (Wales) Act 2014, under which the General Teaching Council for Wales was reconfigured and renamed to become the EWC.
