= General Teaching Council for Northern Ireland =

Northern Irish teaching regulator

The General Teaching Council for Northern Ireland (GTCNI) is the body overseeing the qualification, registration, and good conduct of teachers in Northern Ireland.

== Functions ==
The GTCNI is responsible for upholding the standards of the profession and the registration of new teachers.

== History ==
The GTCNI was established by the Education (Northern Ireland) Order 1998.

In 2016, the organisation consisted of 19 staff and a council consisting of 33 members. The Department of Education introduced a number of "special measures" to the GTCNI, after a lack of trust was identified between members of the council and senior management.. The review also recommended reducing the size of the council to "10 to 12". No change had been made to the size of the council by 2019..

In 2019, ten of the seventeen staff who took part in an investigation said they had been bullied.

In May 2021, eight people resigned from the 33-member council. In December 2021, the Minister of Education suspended the GTCNI.

General Teaching Council (Directions) Act (Northern Ireland) 2022
- Act of the Northern Ireland Assembly
- Northern Ireland Assembly
- Long title: An Act to empower the Department of Education to give binding directions to the General Teaching Council for Northern Ireland.
- Citation: 2022 c. 29 (N.I.)
- Introduced by: Michelle McIlveen

Dates
- Royal assent: 6 June 2022

Status: Current legislation

Text of statute as originally enacted

Teachers were still required to pay the annual fee of £44 to the council in 2022. Legislation, the General Teaching Council (Directions) Act (Northern Ireland) 2022 (c. 29 (N.I.)), was introduced and passed to allow the department to seek "alternative" arrangements.

As of 2024, the GTCNI continues to exist.
