= Early career teacher =

Early career teacher (ECT), formerly newly qualified teacher (NQT), is a category of teacher in the United Kingdom. Early career teachers are those who have gained Qualified Teacher Status but have not yet completed the statutory two year programme. Until 1 September 2021, the category was termed "newly qualified teacher", and only lasted twelve-month.

Qualified teachers are not permitted to work permanently in state-maintained schools unless they have completed or are completing the induction for newly qualified teachers. They are, however, permitted to perform supply work in state-maintained schools for the first five years after gaining Qualified Teacher Status. This has led to the misconception that the ECT induction year must be completed within five years of gaining QTS; there is in fact no statutory time-scale within which a teacher must complete the NQT induction, but after five years they will be unable to do supply work in state-maintained schools.

== Origins ==
NQT began to be used in the mid-1990s following the removal of the requirement for teachers to serve a probationary period in 1991 under the Education (Teachers) (Amendment) Regulations 1992. Until that time, teachers who had recently qualified were more commonly known as probationary teachers, or probationers.

This gradual change was cemented by the introduction of an induction period for teaching in 1999, under the Education (Induction Arrangements for School Teachers) (England) Regulations 1999. These regulations made it a requirement that all teachers complete an induction period equivalent to one year upon qualification as a teacher. This was changed to two years with the introduction of the new "early career teacher (ECT)" programme in 2021.

== Use ==
Although the only definition in legislation refers to a period of two years, the term is commonly used to refer to a teacher who has not yet completed a period of induction. While for teachers who are employed full-time, this period is two years, part-time employees may take several years to complete induction.
