= General Teaching Council for Wales =

Education regulator

The General Teaching Council for Wales was the body overseeing the qualification, registration, and good conduct of teachers in Wales. It was replaced in 2015 by the Education Workforce Council.

== Collections ==
The archives of the GTC and the GTC Trust are held in the archives of the Institute of Education, University College London. The collection includes correspondence, records of meetings, publications and information about the GTC's positions on issues.
