= General Teaching Council for Scotland =

Regulation body in Scotland

- Abbreviation: GTC Scotland; GTCS
- Formation: 1965; 61 years ago
- Key people: Pauline Stephen (chief executive)
- Website: www.gtcs.org.uk

The General Teaching Council for Scotland (GTCS; GTC Scotland) (Scottish Gaelic: Comhairle Choitcheann Teagaisg na h-Alba) is a fee based registered charity and the world's first independent registration and regulation body for teaching. The current Chief Executive and Registrar is Pauline Stephen. The GTC Scotland maintains a register of qualified teachers and college lecturers; there were 80,695 teachers and college lecturers on the register on 31 March 2022.

== History ==
GTC Scotland was the first professional registration and regulation body for teachers in the United Kingdom, and one of the first teaching councils in the world. It was set up in 1965 under the Teaching Council (Scotland) Act 1965 following concerns that entry requirements had lowered after the Second World War and unqualified teachers were working in Scottish schools. Its powers, remits and duties have since been amended by other legislation, including the Teaching and Higher Education Act 1998 and the Standards in Scotland's Schools etc. Act 2000. It is a legal requirement for all teachers working in Scottish local council schools to be registered with GTC Scotland (The Requirements for Teachers (Scotland) Regulations 2005).

In 2018, there was a national agreement to register all lecturers working in Scotland’s colleges through GTC Scotland.

On 2 April 2012 GTC Scotland was granted independent status by the Scottish Government. The Teaching Council (Scotland) Act 1965 was repealed and replaced by the Public Services Reform (GTC Scotland) Order 2011. The Public Services Reform (General Teaching Council for Scotland) Order 2011 was made by Scottish Ministers in accordance with the Public Services Reform (Scotland) Act 2010 and passed into law on 17 March 2011.

== Proposed reform ==
In June 2017, the Scottish Deputy First Minister and Cabinet Secretary for Education and Skills, John Swinney, announced plans to reform the General Teaching Council for Scotland, bringing it together with other professional development bodies in a new Education Workforce Council for Scotland, similar to the Education Workforce Council in Wales. Although described as independent, half of the Welsh EWC members are directly appointed through the Welsh Government public appointments system. The Scottish Government intended to establish the Education Workforce Council for Scotland (EWCS), which it proposed would replace and take on the responsibilities of GTC Scotland, the Community Learning and Development Standards Council and register others working in education. Details were published in the Scottish Government's Empowering Schools consultation on a planned Education Bill in November 2017. However, this proposed Bill was put aside on 26 June 2018 with the Scottish Government instead publishing a joint agreement with Scottish Local Authorities on school empowerment and collaboration.

The Educational Institute of Scotland, Scotland's largest teaching union, said in a statement in June 2017 that: "We remain to be convinced about the need for potential changes to the General Teaching Council, a world renowned teacher-led body which ensures the highest professional standards are maintained." The EIS view is that the plans "risk putting years of progress on teacher professionalism into reverse". The Scottish Secondary Teachers’ Association (SSTA) also voiced opposition saying it would be "a retrograde step". The GTC Scotland published its response to Empowering Schools on 1 February 2018 stating its strong opposition to the establishment of the EWCS. The GTC Scotland response stated: "...there is no evidence-based rationale for replacing GTCS, with its strong brand and highly-regarded national and international reputation, with a new body".

John Swinney stated in the Scottish Parliament on 26 June 2018 that he accepted the “strength of feeling” in the sector to keep GTC Scotland. GTC Scotland accepted Swinney had responded to concerns raised by teachers and the "comprehensive opposition to this proposal in the consultation returns". GTC Scotland said it would continue to work closely with Scottish Government "to consider how a wider range of educational professionals most directly involved in teaching might be registered with GTCS". The EIS said it had "vehemently opposed" the proposal to abolish GTC Scotland and welcomed "the fact that the Scottish Government has listened to the voice of the teaching profession on this very important issue".

== Functions ==
The Public Services Reform (General Teaching Council for Scotland) Order 2011 describes GTC Scotland's general functions. The main ones are to keep a register of teachers qualified to teach in Scottish schools and to establish and review the standards of education and training appropriate to teachers.

GTC Scotland's general functions also include:

- the standards of conduct and professional competence expected of a registered teacher;
- investigating the fitness to teach of registered teachers;
- to keep itself informed of courses for the education and training of teachers;
- to make recommendations to Scottish Ministers on teachers’ education, training, career development and the supply of teachers (with some exceptions);
- to keep registers of other individuals working in educational settings as it thinks fit.

=== Standards of education and training ===
A suite of Professional Standards provides a framework for teachers at all stages in their careers. A revised set of standards came into use in August 2021. Professional Update was launched 18 August 2014. The Standard for Provisional Registration (SPR) and The Standard for Full Registration (SFR) are part of the overall set of GTC Scotland's Professional Standards which also includes The Standard for Career-Long Professional Learning and The Standard for Middle Leadership and Standard for Headship.

GTC Scotland has been given responsibility for Professional Standards for Lecturers in Scotland’s Colleges by the Scottish Government. These Professional Standards have been developed through partnership working between the College Development Network and GTC Scotland. A Standard for Provisional Registration (Lecturers in Scotland’s Colleges) was introduced in February 2023 GTC Scotland works with accredited partners such as SSERC to support both primary and secondary teachers in accessing courses that will fulfill the professional development requirements needed for continued registration.

The GTC Scotland rules around the subjects that Scottish teachers are allowed to teach have been criticised for being too strict because they constrain the ability of head teachers to determine the curriculum in schools and prevent experienced teachers who qualified outside Scotland from being able to take up teaching posts.

== Governing Council and committee structure ==
=== Role of the council ===
The council has a significant role to play in shaping the teaching profession of Scotland and maintaining and improving professional standards. It does this by developing and monitoring the strategic direction and policy of GTC Scotland by determining entry standards to teaching, accrediting courses of teacher education and by setting clear expectations of the profession in its range of published Codes and Professional Standards.

=== Council membership ===
GTC Scotland is governed by a Council made up of 19 elected teachers, 11 nominated educational stakeholder representatives and 7 appointed lay members, who make decisions on matters of strategy and policy. Council membership is determined following a rolling programme: election, nomination and appointments processes take place every two years and half of the members step down at the end of each two-year period.

=== Committee Structure ===
Council members may serve on the following committees and sub-committees:

- Conveners Committee: advises, informs and puts forward recommendations or proposals to Council on all aspects shaping the strategic and policy direction of the council.
- Professional Regulatory Assurance Committee: advises, informs and puts forward recommendations or proposals to the Executive Committee on all rules, guidance and policies relating to the council's panels.
- Education Committee: advises, informs and puts forward recommendations or proposals to council on all educational matters within the council's remit.
- Finance and Corporate Services Committee: advises, informs and puts forward recommendations or proposals to council on GTC Scotland's annual report and accounts, financial matters (including the setting of registration fees) and ensure that GTC Scotland acts legally and within its statutory authority.

=== Adjudication panels, appointments and appeals ===
The council has a series of panels that investigate and adjudicate cases about fitness to teach and registration of individual teachers. The panels consist solely of registrants and lay persons who are independent from the council and who are appointed by the Appointments Committee. The Appointments Committee and the Appeals Board also consist solely of appointed registrants and lay persons who are independent from the council.

== See also ==
- Education in Scotland
- Teaching qualification
