= Professional Graduate Diploma in Education =

Qualifying degree to teach in Scotland

The Professional Graduate Diploma in Education (PGDE) is a one-year postgraduate course for prospective teachers in Scotland. Successful completion of this course allows an individual to teach in a Scottish state school. All PGDE courses at each University are regulated by the Scottish Government and General Teaching Council for Scotland A PGDE is one of the two main routes for entering the teaching profession in Scotland, the other being a 4-year MA/BA Education course.

The course typically lasts for one full academic year, however some providers offer part-time and distance learning options which may last up to two years (for example, Dlite courses). The one-year course typically consists of 36 weeks of training, with 18 weeks spent at university learning about theory and practice and 18 weeks spent on school placements putting theory into practice.

A PGDE course can be taken in either Primary Education, which pertains to teaching of children from ages 3–12 (includes nursery provision) or Secondary Education, which requires the individual to be a subject specialist and involves the teaching of children aged 11–18.

The University of Aberdeen offers the Distance Learning Initial Teacher Education (DLITE) PGDE for both Primary and Secondary where graduates living in or working for one of the partner local authorities can receive a teaching qualification whilst working and studying part-time over 18 months.

Teaching qualifications for Secondary Education in Scotland are annually awarded in the following areas, with some courses being available in Gaelic medium or with a Catholic Teacher’s Certificate:

- Art & Design
- Biology (with Science)
- Business Education
- Chemistry (with Science)
- Computing
- Drama
- English
- Gaelic
- Geography
- History
- Home Economics
- Mathematics
- Media Studies
- Modern Foreign Languages (Chinese, French, German, Italian, Polish, Russian, Spanish)
- Modern Studies
- Music
- Physical Education
- Physics (with Science)
- Religious, Moral and Philosophical Studies
- Technological Education

Depending on the demand for teachers, the following subjects are sometimes offered: Classics, Community Languages (Urdu), Dance, Economics, Geology, Greek, Latin, Philosophy, Psychology, Sociology, Teaching English to Speakers of Other Languages (TESOL)

The Universities which offer PGDE courses are:

- University of Aberdeen
- University of Dundee
- University of Edinburgh
- University of Glasgow
- University of the Highlands and Islands
- University of Strathclyde
- University of the West of Scotland

Courses are not always available in each of these subject specialisms. The Scottish Funding Council analyses the need for teachers in Scotland's schools and decides the number of places for each subject in order to keep up with demand. High demand subjects will have many places available every year (e.g. Primary, Physics and English), whereas low demand subjects will have relatively fewer places (e.g. Drama, Modern Studies). Some subjects will rarely run as a PGDE course as demand is so low, for example Classics and Greek.

== Entry Requirements ==
In order to be accepted all applicants require:

- A degree validated by a higher education institution in the United Kingdom or a degree of an equivalent standard from an institution outside the United Kingdom
- Higher English at Grade C or above (or equivalent)
- National 5 Mathematics at Grade C or above (or equivalent)

Additionally for the PGDE (Secondary) course, the degree must have at least 80 SCQF points coming from subjects relevant to the teaching qualification(s).

== See also ==
- Professional Graduate Certificate in Education, equivalent for England and Wales
