= Julie (given name) =

- Pronunciation: /ˈdʒuːli/
- Gender: Feminine

Origin
- Origin: Latin
- Meaning: "Downy-haired" or "devoted to Jove"

Other names
- Related names: Julia, Julianna, Juliette, Jules, Julianne

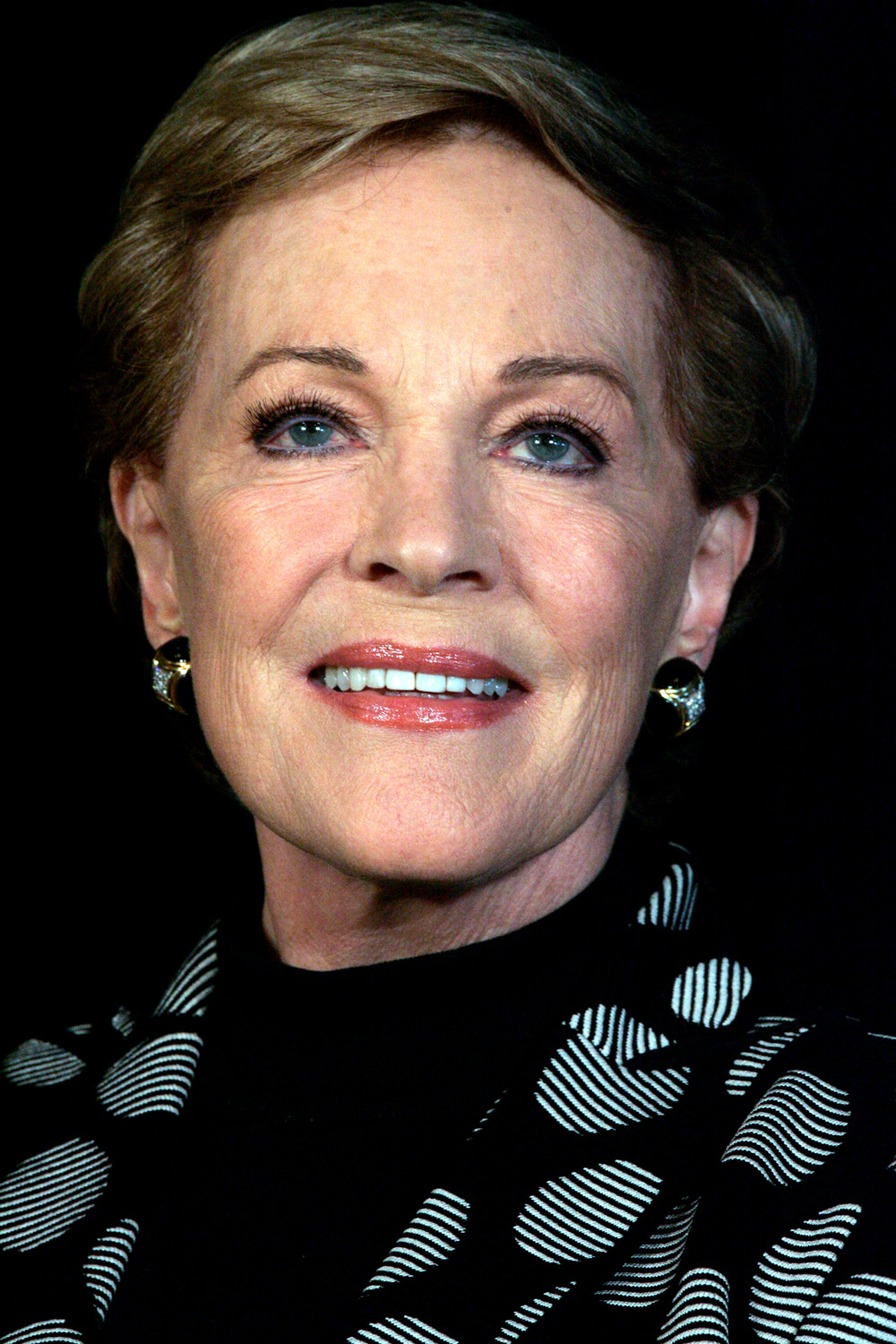
Julie Andrews, 2013

Julie is a Latin first name which originally comes from the Latin Julia, itself derived from the Latin Julius, which is believed to either stem from Ancient Greek: ἴουλος, romanized: íoulos, lit. 'downy-haired' or Latin: Iovilius, lit. 'devoted to Jove'. It can be a pet form of Julia, Yulie, or Juliette.

== Popularity ==
Julie has perpetually been one of the most popular female names used in the United States. According to the United States' Social Security Administration, Julie was consistently in the top one-hundred registered female names in the forty years between 1951 and 1991; peaking at No. 10 in 1971.

Julie has also been a popular given name in some European countries. The name was the fourth most popular female name in Belgium in 2005 and ninth most popular in Denmark in the first half of 2005. In France, the name was only mildly popular in the beginning of the 20th century and its usage nearly disappeared between 1940 and 1970. It then suddenly soared to previously unknown heights, reaching its peak in 1987 when 9,908 Julies were born. It was the 17th most popular name in 2006. Julie may be given to males as well, though mostly as a second or third given name. In 2006, 204 Frenchmen had Julie among their given names.

== History ==
The first appearance of Julie in a popular non-French literary work occurred in Swedish playwright August Strindberg's 1888 tragedy Miss Julie, which became one of the most widely performed plays in the English-speaking world.

== People ==
=== Given name ===
- Julie Adams (1926–2019), American actress
- Julie Raque Adams (born 1969), American politician
- Julie Andrews (born 1935), English actress, singer, director and author
- Julie Benz (born 1972), American actress
- Julie Bergan (born 1994), Norwegian singer-songwriter
- Julie Bergner, American mathematician
- Julie Billiart (1751–1816), French nun
- Julie Bindel (born 1962), British feminist
- Julie Bishop (born 1956), Australian politician
- Julie Bishop (actress) (1914–2001), American actress
- Julie Blanchette (born 1986), Canadian ringette player
- Julie Bowen (born 1970), American actress
- Julie Brown (born 1958), American actress, comedian and singer
- Julie Burchill (born 1959), English writer and columnist
- Julie Buring, American epidemiologist
- Julie Chen (born 1970), American television news anchor and producer
- Julie Choffel, American poet
- Julie Christie (born 1941), British actress
- Julie Chu (born 1982), American ice hockey player
- Julie Clarke (born 1971), American model and actress
- Julie Coin (born 1982), French tennis player
- Julie Cournoyer (born 1970 or 1971), Canadian para-cyclist
- Julie Czerneda (born 1955), Canadian author
- Julie C. Dao, American author
- Julie Dash (born 1952), American film director
- Julie d'Aubigny (1670–1707), French opera singer, Mademoiselle Maupin
- Julie Dawn (1919–2000), English singer
- Julie Dawn Cole (born 1955), English actress
- Julie Mathilde Morrow Deforest (1882–1979), American impressionist painter
- Julie Delpy (born 1969), French-American actress, director, screenwriter and singer-songwriter
- Julie Diana, American ballet dancer, teacher, writer and arts administrator
- Julie Dickson, Canadian public servant
- Julie Ditty (born 1979), American tennis player
- Julie Doiron, Canadian musician
- Julie Dore (born 1960), British politician
- Julie Dorsey, American computer scientist
- Julie Bjervig Drivenes (born 1999), Norwegian cross-country skier
- Julie Dzerowicz, Canadian politician
- Julie Nixon Eisenhower (born 1948), American author, daughter of former President Richard Nixon
- Julie Feeney, Irish singer and composer
- Julie Fernandez-Fernandez (born 1972), Belgian politician
- Julie Forss (born 1998), Finnish footballer
- Julie Foudy (born 1971), American soccer player
- Julie Fowlis, Scottish singer and composer
- Julie Frost, American songwriter, singer, guitarist and record producer
- Julie Goodyear (born 1942), English actress
- Julie E. Gray, British plant molecular biologist
- Julie Halard-Decugis (born 1970), French tennis player
- Julie Harris (1925–2013), American actress
- Julie Heldman (born 1945), American tennis player
- Julie Hilling (born 1959), British politician
- Julie Holland (born 1965), American psycho-pharmacologist, psychiatrist, and author
- Julie Howe, California screenwriter
- Julie Ivy, American health care statistician
- Julie Jackson, American politician
- Julie Jacobsen (politician) (born 1985), Danish politician
- Julie Kavner (born 1950), American actress
- Julie Kenny (1957–2025), English businesswoman
- Julie Kent (born 1969), American ballet dancer
- Julie Kerton, American politician
- Julie Klausner (born 1978), American writer, comedian, actress, and podcaster
- Julie Lemieux (born 1962), Canadian voice actress
- Julie Lemieux (politician), Canadian politician
- Julie Letai (born 2000), American short track speed skater
- Julie London (1926–2000), American singer and actress
- Julie V. Lund (born 1959), American judge
- Julie Mayberry, American politician
- Julie McNiven (born 1980), American actress
- Julie Mennell (born 1970), English academic
- Julie Mond, American actress
- Julie Morstad, Canadian writer and illustrator
- Julie Newmar (born 1933), American actress, dancer and singer
- Julie Owono (born c. 1987), French and Cameroonian lawyer
- Julie Pacey (1955/1956–1994), English murder victim
- Julie Payette (born 1963), Canadian astronaut and engineer
- Julie Powell (1973–2022), American author
- Julie Pullin (born 1975), British tennis player
- Julie Rayne, English singer
- Julie Reeves (born 1974), American country singer-songwriter
- Julie Reshe, Ukrainian-born philosopher and psychoanalyst
- Julie Reuben (born 1960), American historian
- Julie Roberts (born 1979), American country singer-songwriter
- Julie Roberts (artist) (born 1963), Welsh painter
- Julie Robinson (disambiguation), multiple people
- Julie Roginsky (born 1973), American political strategist and television commentator
- Julie Rosen (born 1957), American politician
- Julie Rrap (born 1950), Australian artist
- Julie Rubio (born 1969), American film producer and director
- Julie Ryan (disambiguation), multiple people
- Julie Salamon (born 1953), American journalist and author
- Julie Salinger (1863–1942), German politician
- Julie Salmon (born 1965), British tennis player
- Julie Anne San Jose (born 1994), Filipino actress and singer
- Julie Sanders, British academic
- Julie Sandstede, American politician
- Julie Saunders (bowls), English bowls player
- Julie Seitter, American voice actress
- Julie Shigekuni (born 1962), American writer
- Julie Smith (disambiguation), multiple people
- Julie Sommars (born 1940), American actress
- Julie Spira, American relationship counselor and writer
- Julie Stevens (disambiguation), multiple people
- Julie Stewart (born 1967), Canadian actress and television director
- Julie Stewart-Binks (born 1987), Canadian television sports journalist
- Julie Strain (born 1962), American actress and model
- Julie Talma (1756–1805), French dancer and courtesan
- Julie Tan (born 1992), Malaysian actress
- Julie Taymor (born 1952), American director of theatre, opera and film
- Julie Theriot (born 1967), American microbiologist
- Julie Thomas (born 1967), Welsh lawn bowler
- Julie Thomas, first Chief Minister of Saint Helena
- Julie Todaro, American librarian
- Julie Tolentino, American dancer and choreographer
- Julie Tremble, Canadian experimental filmmaker
- Julie Tristan, American television journalist
- Julie Underwood, American education school dean
- Julie Umerle, American-born British painter
- Julie Van Espen (1996–2019), Belgian homicide victim
- Julie VanOrden, American politician
- Julie Vargas (born 1938), American educator
- Julie Vega (1968–1985), Filipina child actress
- Julie Verhoeven (born 1969), British illustrator and designer
- Julie Vinter Hansen (1890–1960), Dutch astronomer
- Julie Vlasto (1903–1985), French tennis player
- Julie Vollertsen (born 1959), American volleyball player
- Julie Marie Wade (born 1979), American writer and professor
- Julie Wainwright, American business executive
- Julie T. Wallace (born 1961), English actress
- Julie Walters (born 1950), English actress and novelist
- Julie Ward (judge), Australian judge
- Julie Ward (politician) (born 1957), British politician
- Julie Warner (born 1965), American actress
- Julie White (disambiguation), multiple people
- Julie Willis, Australian architectural historian
- Julie Wilson (1924–2015), American singer and actress
- Julie Wolfthorn (1864–1944), German painter
- Julie Yorn (born 1967), American film producer
- Julie Zahra (born 1982), Maltese singer
- Julie Zeilinger (born 1993), American feminist writer
- Julie Zenatti (born 1981), French singer and television personality
- Julie Zetlin (born 1990), American rhythmic gymnast
- Julie Zhuo, Chinese-American computer scientist
- Julie Zickefoose (born 1958), American biologist and nature writer
- Julie Zogg (born 1992), Swiss snowboarder
- Julie Zwarthoed (born 1994), Dutch ice hockey player
- Julie Zwillich (born 1969), American-Canadian actress and television personality

=== Nickname ===
- Julie Archoska (1905–1972), American football player
- Julius La Rosa (1930–2016), American pop music singer
- Julius J. Radice (1908–1966), American athlete and physician
- Julius Schwartz (1915–2004), American comics editor
- Julius Seligson (1909–1987), American tennis player

=== Mononyms ===
- Julie (Julie Berthelsen), Danish pop singer and songwriter
- Julie (Kenji Sawada), Japanese pop singer, composer and actor
- Julie (葛佳慧), a Chinese pop singer and songwriter who developed in Japan and largely sings in Japanese. Her name is also often stylized as Ju!ie in English

== Fictional characters ==
- Julie, a character in NBC sitcom Friends and one of Ross's girlfriends throughout the show
- Julie Powers, a character in Scott Pilgrim

== Alternative spellings and translations ==
- Julia (Latin), (English), (German), (Polish), (Bulgarian), (Spanish)
- Julie (Czech), (Danish), (English), (French), (Norwegian)
- Giulia (Italian)
- Ioulia (Ιουλία) (Greek)
- Iulia (Greek), (Romanian)
- Iúile (Irish)
- Jorna (Swedish)
- Júlia (Catalan), (Hungarian), (Portuguese)
- Juli (English)
- Juliino (Esperanto)
- July (English)
- Juulia (Finnish)
- Juri (Japanese)
- Yula, Yuliya (Assyrian)
- Yulia, Yulya, Yuliya (Russian), (Ukrainian)
- Yulie (Hebrew, Spanish)

=== Rare spellings ===
- Jully, the given name of Canadian singer Jully Black
- Jewellee
- Jewelia
- Julee
- Juli

== See also ==
- Julia (given name)
- Yulia
- Special:AllPages/Julie
