= Jula =

Jula may refer to:

== Places ==
- Jula, the German name of Gyula, a town in Hungary
- Bareh Jula, a village in Iran
- Jula Deh, a village in Iran
- Jula Kamar, a village in Iran

== Other ==
- Jula (name)
- Dioula language spoken in western Africa
- Jula or Dyula people, western Africa
