= Heart of Worcestershire College =

Further education college in the United Kingdom

Coordinates: 52.337647°N 2.050066°W

- Bromsgrove, Malvern, Redditch and Worcester, Worcestershire; United Kingdom

Information
- Type: Further Education College
- Department for Education URN: 130713 Tables
- Ofsted: Reports
- Principal and Governor: Michelle Dowse
- Gender: Mixed
- Age: 16+
- Enrolment: Approximately 10,000+
- Website: http://www.howcollege.ac.uk

Heart of Worcestershire College is an academic institution with campuses at Worcester, Malvern, Redditch and Bromsgrove. It was established in August 2014 on the merging of Worcester College of Technology and North East Worcestershire College (commonly abbreviated to NEW College).

== History ==
=== North East Worcestershire College ===
The logo of North East Worcestershire College

North East Worcestershire College (NEW College) was founded in 1988 from the merger of North Worcestershire College and Redditch College of Further Education.

It had campuses at Redditch and Bromsgrove which also offered outreach courses in community and employer premises across Worcestershire. Enrolment was open to anyone aged 16 and over and during the year 2009-2010 there were around 3000 full-time and 6000 part-time students enrolled at the college. In addition to full and part-time courses, the college offered apprenticeship training in subjects that included Accounting, Business Administration, Child-Care, Construction Trades, Engineering, Hairdressing, Health and Social Care and Motor Vehicle Engineering.

In 2011, NEW College opened a £3.5m extension which included a new TV studio, Music Centre and Games/Interactive Media studio.

In November 2012, the Foundation Degree Media Moving Image students, created an animated music video featuring the song "All the Broken Toys at Christmas" and toys such as Action Man, Barbie and Scalextric, to raise money for Sense for the Christmas period. At the world premiere of the music video, held at the college on 28 November, two days before its official release, Virginia Von Malachowski, a manager from Sense was present and praised the project.

=== Worcester College of Technology (aka Worcester College or Worcester Tech) ===
The logo of Worcester College of Technology

The college had its origin in a School of Design which was opened in Pierpoint Street, Worcester, in 1851. In 1894, a School of Science and Art was built in Sansome Walk as part of the Victoria Institute and this served as the headquarters of the college until 1962 when the new buildings in Deansway were occupied. In 1991, the college adopted its current name of Worcester College of Technology.

The college also had two main sites including its Art and Design and Sports departments (including beauty courses) on Barbourne Road, about a mile from the City Centre, and at other locations in the city.

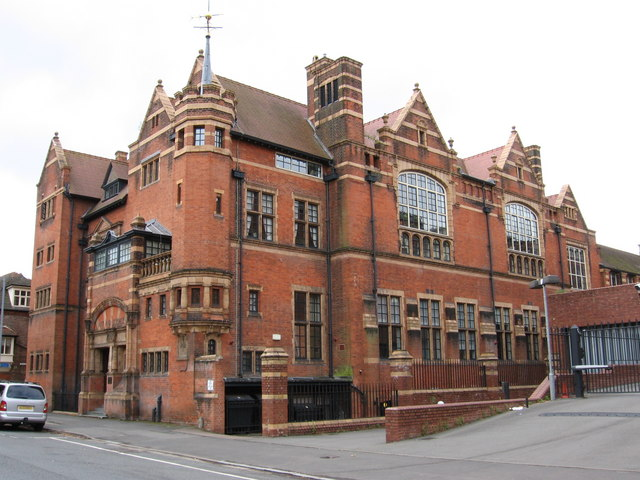
The Victoria Institute, home of the college from 1894 to 1962, photographed in 2009

In 1939 the annual College enrolment was around 600 students, most of whom attended evening classes. This had risen to 15,000 enrolled students in 2006, including 3,000 full-time students. Around 1,000 of the students were studying for Higher Education Qualifications. The college included a Sixth Form Centre, offering A-Levels and other qualifications. No state schools in Worcester had sixth forms, and so it was one of only two Sixth Form Centres in the city.

In 2014 the college received "Good" in their Ofsted inspection.

==== Barbourne College ====
Much of the Barbourne building has been turned into an apartment building for older people.

=== Heart of Worcestershire College ===
On 1 August 2014, North East Worcestershire College (NEW College) and Worcester College of Technology formally amalgamated. The decision, was agreed by both corporations, and the name was approved by the appointed Skills Minister, Nicholas Boles.

==== Louis Makepeace height controversy ====
The college gained national attention after unable to offer him a place on a cooking course to 18 year old Louis Makepeace with dwarfism, this was due to his application being too late for college to make the appropriate, and expense, adaptions to the professional kitchens. Standing at 3 ft 10in, the college would have to make the environment appropriate so that there were no health and safety risks for himself and fellow students. Makepeace described the rejection as "highly humiliating and embarrassing". Makepeace had previously been on the Performing Arts course at the college where there were no issues.

== Name of the college ==
The first name proposed for the merged college was Worcestershire College, but this was rejected by the then Skills Minister, Matt Hancock. During the consultation phase of the merger Sir Peter Luff, the MP for Mid-Worcestershire, complained that Worcestershire College made it sound like it was the only college in the county and that this would be unfair to South Worcestershire College and Warwickshire College, who both have campuses in Worcestershire.

== Campuses ==
=== Bromsgrove ===
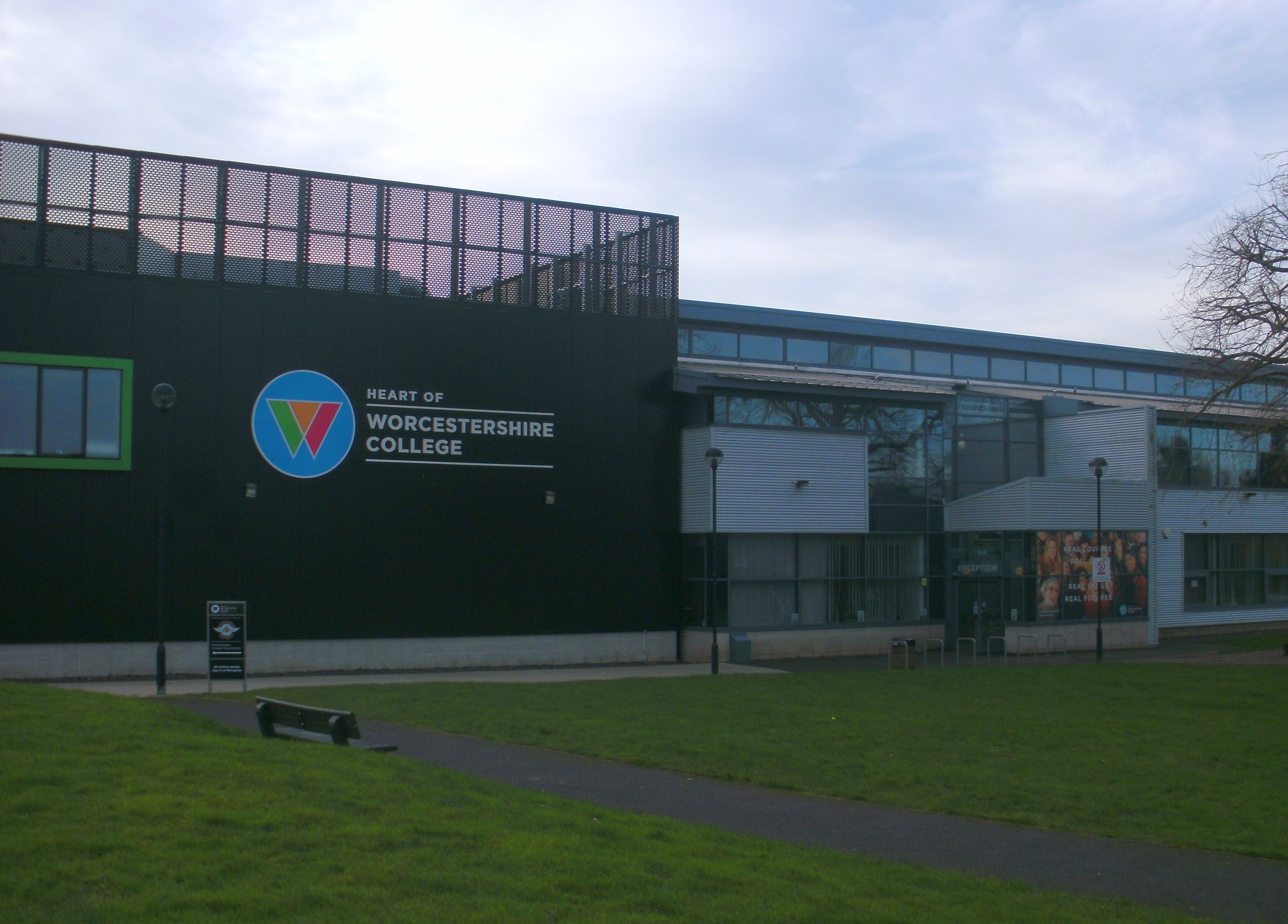
Heart of Worcestershire College, Bromsgrove

The Bromsgrove campus is situated at Slideslow Drive, next door to the Artrix, which is a multi purpose arts centre that provides theatre and cinema screening.

This campus was Shenstone Polytechnic University during the 1960s, and has experienced dramatic downsizing in recent decades arising from a combination of lack of student quantities and financial constraints.

=== Malvern Campus ===
The college's "Construction Centre of Excellence" opened in 2006 at Spring Lane in Malvern. The centre teaches construction trades, brickwork and painting and decorating.

=== Redditch ===
The main campus is the Redditch campus situated at Peakman Street, while also the town situates Osprey House located at Albert Street and Alliance House, located on Fishing Line Road

=== Worcester ===
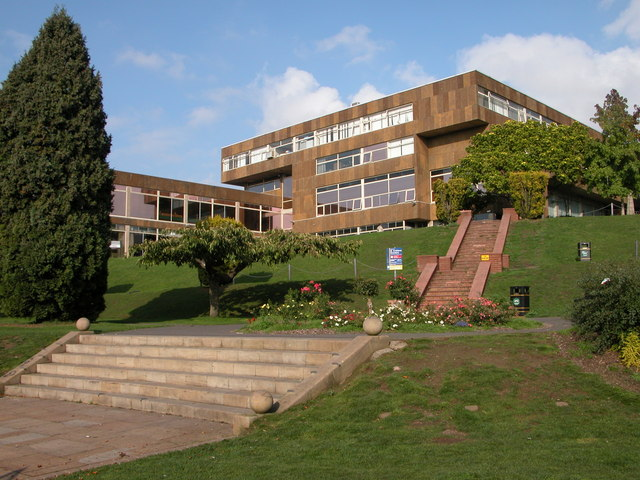
The All Saints Building in 2006

There are several buildings for the college in the city of Worcester. One is the All Saints' Building, located on Deansway. Following a £298,000 investment from the Worcestershire Local Enterprise Partnership, the college has refurbished and developed its Special Education Needs (SEN) facilities, The Base.

The Base facilities include a sensory room, a mocked up 'flat' to be used to support learners to develop independence skills, refurbished classroom areas and improved access to online facilities which support independent learning, in preparation for employment or living independently.

Moreover, the building is also home to its Spires Theatre, predominantly used by its performing arts and music students.

Its St Dunstan's Building is used for its creative arts and hair and beauty provision. This building has a commercial salon, Fountains, art and design studios and coffee shop.

In 2017, the college teamed up with Freedom Leisure and Worcester City Council to develop sports facilities for its students at Perdiswell Leisure Club. Facilities include: fitness studios, football pitch and classrooms.

The Duckworth Centre of Engineering, is home to the college's automotive workshops, following a move from the Northbrook Automotive Centre in 2019.

As well as its facilities at The Duckworth Centre of Engineering, on Midland Road, Worcester, the college also has engineering facilities at its Cathedral Building. Located on Deansway, the building hosts its electrical installation and manufacturing courses.

== Notable former students and staff ==
- Benjamin Williams Leader (1831–1923), landscape painter – studied at Worcester College of Design
- Thomas Brock (1847–1922), sculptor – studied at Worcester College of Design
- Michael John Foster (born 1963), politician – lecturer in accountancy and finance at Worcester College of Technology
