= Yula (disambiguation) =

Yula is an archaeological site of the Maya civilization of pre-Columbian Mesoamerica.

Yula or YULA may also refer to:

- Yula (moth), genus of moth
- Yula (name)
- Yula (river), Russia
- Yeshiva University High Schools of Los Angeles, a private Orthodox Jewish high school in Los Angeles, California

== See also ==
- Jula (disambiguation)
