= Diana Hess =

American academic

Diana Hess is the former dean of the University of Wisconsin-Madison's School of Education.

== Career ==
Hess earned her bachelor's degree from Western Illinois University, master's from the University of Illinois, and In 1998, a doctorate from the University of Washington College of Education. She taught high school social studies before becoming an assistant professor at the University of Wisconsin–Madison School of Education in 1999. Her doctoral dissertation focused on teachers who excelled at facilitating classroom discussions of controversial issues She researches school civic education programs and their effect on civic engagement, particularly when discussing controversial political issues. Hess's published works include Controversy in the Classroom, which won the 2009 National Council for the Social Studies Exemplary Research Award, and The Political Classroom (2014). She was the senior vice president of the Spencer Foundation before she was named dean of the UW School of Education in June 2015. Her predecessor, Julie Underwood, served the post for a decade. Hess's term began in August 2015 and ended in June 2024.

== Awards ==
- University of Washington College of Education’s 2018 Distinguished Alumnus Award
- American Educational Research Association’s Outstanding Book Award (2016)
- Grawemeyer Award in Education (2017)
