= Julie White (disambiguation) =

Julie White may refer to:

- Julie White (born 1961), American actress
- Julie White (businesswoman) (born 1967), British businesswoman and entrepreneur
- Julie White (high jumper) (born 1960), Canadian Olympic high jumper
- Julie White (politician), Canadian politician and member of the National Assembly of Quebec
