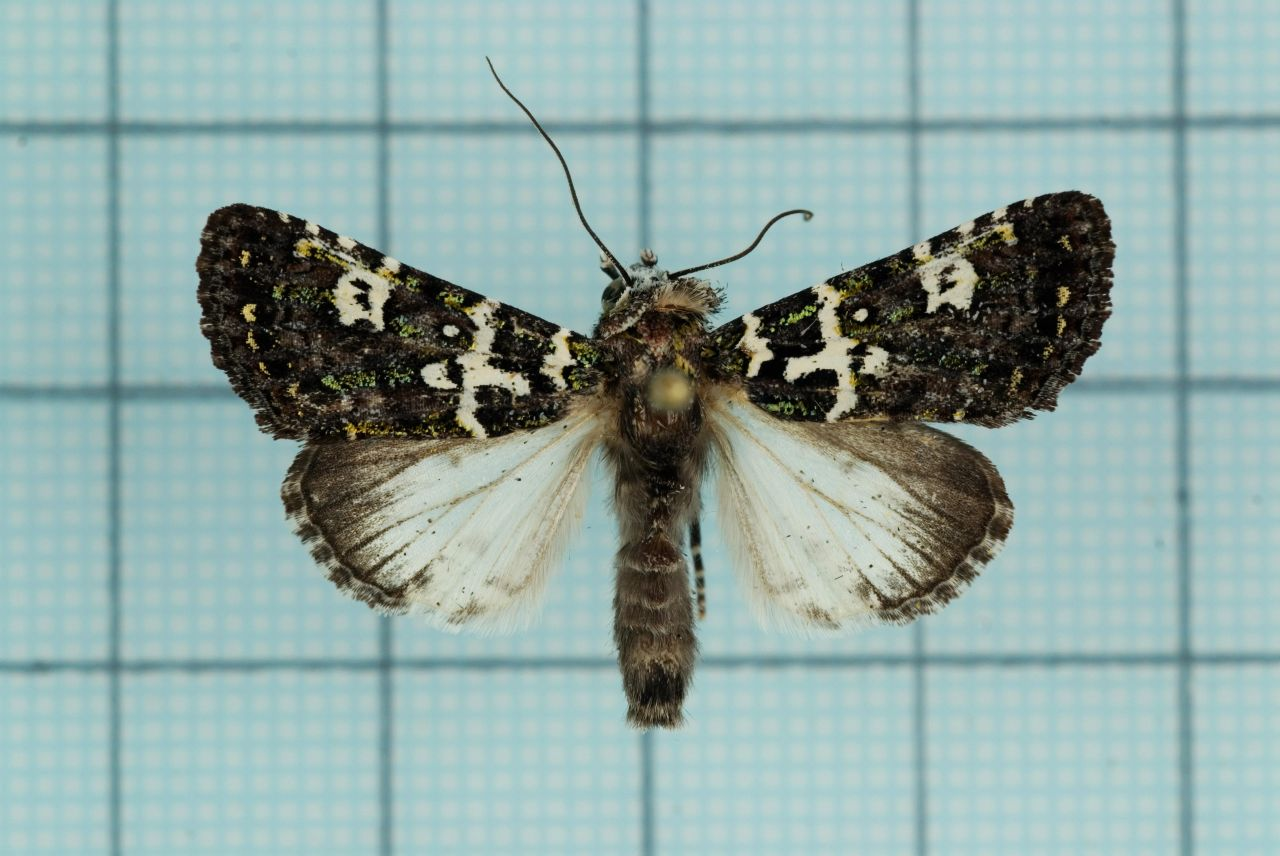
- Karana gemmifera

Scientific classification
- Domain: Eukaryota
- Kingdom: Animalia
- Phylum: Arthropoda
- Class: Insecta
- Order: Lepidoptera
- Superfamily: Noctuoidea
- Family: Noctuidae
- Genus: Karana; Moore, 1882

Synonyms
- Yula Bethune-Baker, 1906

= Karana (moth) =

Genus of moths

Karana is a genus of moths of the family Noctuidae.

== Taxonomy ==
The genus Yula is treated as a valid genus or a synonym of Karana.

== Species ==
- Karana argyrosemastis (Hampson, 1918)
- Karana argyrospila (Warren, 1912)
- Karana decorata Moore, 1882
- Karana gemmifera (Walker, [1858])
- Karana hoenei (Bang-Haas, 1927)
- Karana laetevirens (Oberthür, 1884)
- Karana metallica Boursin, 1970
- Karana moneta (Warren, 1912)
- Karana novaeguineae (Bethune-Baker, 1906)
- Karana submarginata (Warren, 1912)
- Karana tenuilinea (Warren, 1912)
