= Thomas S. Popkewitz =

- Born: August 16, 1940 (age 86); New York City, New York, U.S.
- Education: Steinhardt School of Culture, Education, and Human Development; Teachers College, Columbia University; Hunter College
- Scientific career
- Workplaces: University of Wisconsin–Madison

Thomas S. Popkewitz (born August 16, 1940) is a professor in the department of curriculum and instruction, University of Wisconsin–Madison School of Education, US. His studies explore historically and contemporary education as practices of making different kinds of people (e.g., the citizen, the learner, the child left behind) that distribute differences (e.g., the achievement gap). He has written or edited approximately 40 books and 300 articles in journals and book chapters translated into 17 languages. Recent studies focus on the comparative reason of educational research as cartographies and architectures that produce phantasmagrams of societies, population and differences. The studies entail theoretical, discursive, ethnography, and historical studies that explore school, professional identities, and the relation to conceptions of differences inscribed childhood, learning and cultural differences.

== Biography ==
Popkewitz earned a B.A. at Hunter College, City University of New York (1962), a M.A. at Teachers College, Columbia University (1964) and an Ed.D. from New York University (1970). The American Educational Research Association awarded Popkewitz the Division B (Curriculum Studies) Lifetime Achievement Award (2008) and the University of Wisconsin–Madison School of Education gave him its Distinguished Faculty Award (2008). Popkewitz was elected as Fellow to the American Educational Research Association (2014). He has also been awarded a fellowship as guest researcher professor at the French Ministère de L’Éducation Nationale, De L’Ensigeignement Supérieur et De La Recherche, Institut National de Recherche Pédagogique (2010), distinguished overseas professor at East China Normal University (2014–2016), guest professor at Luxembourg (2012–2014), Doctor Honoris Causa at the Universidad de Granada in Spain (2014), and lifetime honorary professor at the Nanjing Normal University. He was elected to the Laureate Chapter of Kappa Delta Pi, International Honor Society in Education in 2016.

Popkewitz began his career at the University of Wisconsin-Madison in 1970, where he holds the position of professor. In 1978 Popkewitz was selected by the US State Department to organize an American delegation on teaching and learning for joint Soviet/American seminar at USSR Academy of Pedagogical Sciences Presidium, marking the beginning of a career that has been particularly defined by its international focus. In 1981, he was named a Fulbright Fellow, allowing him to spend the year at the USSR Academy of Pedagogical Sciences as a senior researcher. In the Fall of 1988, he was a Fellow at the Swedish Collegium for Advanced Study in the Social Sciences in Uppsala and from 1994 to 1999 acted as a visiting professor at Umeå University in Sweden. His international work has also included an award (1988) as W. F. Wilson Fellow from the Oppenheimer Foundation 1999–2000, in 1999–2000 a Senior Fulbright Fellow award at the University of Helsinki, and in 2004 a Finnish Academy of Science Fellow award.

== Curriculum Studies ==
From the 1940s through the Cold War, curricular thinking was dominated by Ralph W. Tyler and his idea of teaching. In the post-Sputnik years, this procedural and instrumental mentality was recast as the development of scientifically oriented and efficient teaching methods (Pinar, et al.[4]). In the 1960s a variety of social and academic movements recognized the role of the politics of knowledge, cultural differences and the limits of objectivity-based theories. In this context, Pinar and colleagues (1995) consider that Popkewitz summarized the key elements of the new era already in 1988:

Understanding research…requires thought about the intersection of biography, history, and social structure. While we are immersed in our personal histories, our practices are not simply products of our intent and will. We take part in the routines of daily life, we use language that is socially created to make camaraderie with others possible, and we develop affiliation with the roles and institutions that give form to our identities.

Green and Cormack (2009) credit Popkewitz with having founded "The Popkewitz School of Research", or alternatively called "the Popkewitz Tradition", that investigates the social epistemology of the school. Green and Cormack (2009) note that the most interesting and conceptually rich work in curriculum has increasingly addressed itself to questions of textuality, language and discourse, noting further that previously there had been little explicit recognition or acknowledgment in the field as a whole of the importance of language in and for schooling, as well as for knowledge, identity and power. They argue that “here what might be appropriately if somewhat provocatively called the Popkewitz school” was a central site of embracing the linguistic turn (2009, p. 224).

Clearly, his research introduced the construct of social epistemology to Curriculum Studies. It considers language and knowledge as cultural practices having significant material consequences, from a theoretical viewpoint far different from Marxist or Neo-Marxist critiques of functionalism and instrumentalism (Pereyra & Franklin, 2014). Popkewits’ publications on social epistemology are: Cosmopolitanism and the age of school reform: Science, education and making society by making the child (2007), translated into Spanish, Swedish, and forthcoming in Chinese and Italian; A political sociology of educational reform: Power/Knowledge in teaching, teacher education, and research (1991), translated into Spanish, Portuguese, and Russian, and forthcoming in Chinese. He co-authored Educational knowledge: Changing relationships between the state, civil society, and the educational community (2000) and Foucault's challenge: Discourse, knowledge, and power in education (1998).In 2015, The Center for Thomas Popkewitz Studies was opened within the Beijing Normal University Department of Curriculum and Instruction to develop this research tradition within China.

== Foucaultian Approaches to Curriculum Studies ==
Popkewitz draws on the work of philosopher Michel Foucault already in 1988 (Foucault Challenge). In his works, the knowledge of education is an issue of power as productive, as shaping, and in circulation rather than a simplistic concept of power envisioned as negative, juridical, sovereign, and static.

The Political Sociology of Educational Reform takes the sociology of knowledge into dialogue with Foucault and other continental philosophical work. Thus, Popkewitz historicizes knowledge and analyses the way school transforms it into a “psychologized” type in the K-12 curricula. His analysis problematizes reductionist, dualistic and what he calls “administrative conceptions” of being, agency, and change – a social epistemology of knowledge-production as non-monolithic and contingent. Key in Popkewitz's approach is the inherent reflexivity, which enables him to questions the “systems of reason”. In Cosmopolitanism and the Age of School Reform (2008), “the cosmopolitan” is approached through historicizing its epistemological principles. The analysis demonstrates the assemblages of systems of reason and illustrates the shifts within different moments and under different cultural, statist, and global pressures. Popkewitz's research shifts the question in education research from “Whose knowledge is of most worth?” to “What gets to count as knowledge in the first place?” His redefinition attempts to challenge a set of traditional binaries often found in educational research.

== Studies of Social Inclusion, Exclusion and Abjection ==
Popkewitz engages in fundamental questions about social exclusion in national school reform efforts. Popkewitz explores historically and sociologically how a comparative style of thought enters into school reform to recognize difference. In his view, difference produces distinctions and differentiations that leads to exclusion and abjection.

Struggling for the Soul (1998) combines Foucauldian power-knowledge nexus with ethnographic research of teachers in urban and rural schools. The study offers a way of thinking about how differences such as national/international, advanced/left behind are produced through the commonsense reasoning on teaching. The book's focus on urban education is significant as reforming urban education has been a major social policy and research effort since WWII. The volume's thesis is that different ideological positions about school reform and concepts of equity and justice often maintain the same principles of ordering, classifying and dividing, keeping problematic and restricted notions of identity still in play.

== Development of New Theoretical Approaches and Constructs ==
The social epistemology of Popkewitz engages with what he calls “systems of reason.” His research maps “reason” as the historical logic and underlying cultural principles that inform the practices of teacher education, educational reform, and the education sciences. Systems of reason are arbitrary, historical, and culturally constituted. In each chronotope, systems of reason influence the construction of the line between truth and falsity, knowledge and opinion, fact and belief. Popkewitz examines how the rules and standards of reason in various disciplinary fields are translated and transformed within the practices of schooling; how historically formed systems of ideas construct our sense of identity; and, how these systems of reason are part of institutional standards and power relations. Through ethnographic,[7] textual and historical studies,[8] he has "made visible" the principles that order and shape how teachers organize, observe, supervise, and evaluate students and has illuminated the ways these systems produce norms that serve to exclude students who are poor or of color.

Popkewitz has developed a number of new constructs to engage in empirical research related to education: double gestures, traveling libraries and the indigenous foreigner, cosmopolitanism as a cultural thesis, the alchemy of school subjects, and salvific themes in secular objects. Through the construct of “traveling libraries,” Popkewitz challenges comparative education scholarship in that he focuses on how ideas travel and intersect with other “authors" to produce particular cultural ways of “seeing” and acting. “Traveling libraries” is linked to an “indigenous foreigner” concept, that implies an ironic understanding how ideas are nationalized and naturalized. This mode of analysis produces a notion of Dewey (2005) as “an indigenous foreigner,” whose ideas connect significantly with other ideas and cultural principles (“traveling libraries”) in different times and geographical spaces that have little to do with pragmatism's historical and cultural origins.

Popkewitz plainly demonstrates that the traveling of discourses is neither purely from a center to a periphery, or from fixed point to fixed point, but rather, it is mediated by sociohistorically specific discursive frames that redefine “the national interest”. What appears to be a unidirectional spread or diffusion of discourses is a far more complex appropriation of available tools enmeshed with localized systems of reason (2009). Highly visible and popular worldwide trends in education are reinterpreted and redefined such as inclusive schooling, best practices, and “Education for All”.

Finally, through his examination of what he calls salvific themes in secular objects, Popkewitz challenges the secularization thesis of modernity as it relates to the school.[10] He articulates how particular strains of American Protestant reformism are inscribed in what are widely viewed as secular education practices; to demonstrate how these discourses have shaped dominant education logics; and to document how they have informed dominant conceptualizations in education sciences of children's learning, problem solving, action, and community.

Popkewitz's approach goes beyond intersectionality studies, systems theory, and the qualitative/quantitative divide. He proposes a radical critique of how the European and American enlightenments helped to constitute what count as good knowledge, good method, good care, and good education through the formation of the very academic disciplines. Through integrating a variety of postfoundationalist literatures, cultural histories, and accounts of American exceptionalism, Popkewitz has demonstrated how narratives that emerged through a particular Protestant reformism shaped dominant education discourse. He is the first scholar in curriculum studies in the US to reference how religious discourses about salvation and redemption were inscribed in educational practices and research.

A variety of “mixed methods” approaches that involve historical, policy, statistical, and ethnographic study illustrate a further innovation in the field. His major contributions in this area include The study of schooling: Field methodologies in educational research and evaluation (1981), Teacher education: A critical examination of its folklore, theory, and practice (1987), The formation of the school subject-matter: The struggle for creating an American institution (1987), Critical theories in education: Changing terrains of knowledge and politics (1997), Cultural history and education: Critical studies on knowledge and schooling (2001), Governing children, families, and education: Restructuring the welfare state (2003), and Education research and policy: Steering the knowledge-based economy (2006).

Popkewitz's international recognition is evident from the translation of his major books, such as, The myth of educational reform: School responses to planned change (1982, into Spanish), Paradigm and ideology in educational research: Social functions of the intellectual (1984, Spanish), Teacher education: A critical examination of its folklore, theory, and practice (1989, Spanish), A political sociology of educational reform: Power/Knowledge and power in teaching, teacher education, and research (1991, Spanish Portuguese, Russian, and Traditional Chinese), Struggling for the Soul: The politics of education and the construction of the teacher (1998, Spanish, Portuguese, and Chinese), Foucault's challenge: Discourse, knowledge, and power in education (2000, with M. Brennan, Spanish), Reformas Educativas e Formacao de Professores Novoa, A., & Popkewitz, T. S. (Eds.), (1992), Cosmopolitanism and the age of school reform: Science, education and making society by making the child (2008, Spanish).

== Selected books ==
- Zhao, W., Popkewitz, T S & Autio, T.Eds. (2022). Epistemic Colonialism and the Transfer of Curriculum Knowledge across Borders: Applying a Historical Lens to Contest Unilateral Logics. Routledge.
- Popkewitz, T., Pettersson, D., & Hsiao, K. (Eds.). (2021). The International Emergence of Educational Sciences in the Post-World War Two Years: Quantification, Visualization, and Making Kinds of People. Routledge.
- Popkewitz, T. (2020). The Impracticality of Practical Research: A History of Sciences of Change that Conserve. The University of Michigan Press. (Also translated into Chinese and Spanish.)
- Fan, G., & Popkewitz, T. (Eds.). (2020). Handbook of education policy studies. Values, Governance, Globalization and Methodology, Volume 1 . =Springer (English) and Educational Publishing House (Chinese).
- Fan, G., & Popkewitz, T. (Eds.). (2020). Handbook of education policy studies. School/University, Curriculum, and Assessment, Volume 2. Springer (English) and Educational Publishing House (Chinese).
- Popkewitz, T., Diaz, J & Kirchgasler, eds. (2017). A Political Sociology of Educational Knowledge: Studies of Exclusions and Difference. Routledge/MacMillan.
- Popkewitz, T. ed. (2015). The "Reason" of Schooling: Historicizing Curriculum Studies, Pedagogy, and Teacher Education. Routledge.
- Popkewitz, T. (ed.) (2013). Rethinking the history of education: An intercontinental perspective on the questions, methods and knowledge of schools. Palgrave MacMillan.
- Popkewitz T., & Rizvi, F. (eds.). (2009). Globalization and the study of education (108 Yearbook. Vol 2). National Society for the Study of Education.
- Popkewitz, T. (2008). Cosmopolitanism and the age of school reform: Science, education and making society by making the child. Routledge. (This book has been translated into Portuguese and Swedish and translated and published in Spanish [Morata]).
- Popkewitz, T., Olsson, U., Petersson, K. & Kowalczyk, J. eds. (2006) ’The future is not what it appears to be’ Pedagogy, Genealogy and Political Epistemology in Honor and in Memorial to Kenneth Hultqvist. Stockholm Institute of Education Press.
- Popkewitz, T. (Ed.) (2005). Inventing the modern self and John Dewey: Modernities and the traveling of pragmatism in education. Palgrave Macmillan Press.
- Popkewitz, T. (Ed.) (2000). Educational knowledge: Changing relationships between the state, civil society, and the educational community. State University of New York Press.
- Popkewitz, T. & Fendler, L. (Eds.) (1999). Critical theories in education: Changing terrains of knowledge and politics. Routledge.
- Popkewitz, T. (1998). Struggling for the soul: The politics of schooling and the construction of the teacher. Teachers College Press.
- Popkewitz, T. & Brennan, M. (Eds.) (1998). Foucault's Challenge: Discourse, knowledge, and power in education. Teachers College Press. (Translated and published in Spain)
- Popkewitz, T. (1991). A political sociology of educational reform: Power/knowledge in teaching, teacher education and research. Teachers College Press.
- Popkewitz, Thomas S. (1984). Paradigm and ideology in educational research: Social functions of the intellectual. Falmer Press. (Paradigma e ideología en investigación educative. A. Ballesteros, trans. Madrid: Mondadori, 1984).

== Selected articles ==
- Popkewitz, T. S. (2022). Comparative Reasoning, Fabrication, and International Education Assessments: Desires about Nations, Society, and Populations. International Journal of Educational Research 1120 (https://doi.org/10.1016/j.ijer.2022.101940
- Popkewitz, T. (2020). The Paradoxes of Practical Research: The Good Intentions of Inclusion that Exclude and Abject. The European Educational Research Journal. https://doi.org/10.1177/1474904120915391
- Popkewitz, T (2018). What is “really” taught as the content of school subjects? Teaching school subjects as an alchemy. The High School Journal, 101(2), 77–89.
- Popkewitz, T. (2015). Educational planning, sciences, and the conservation of the present as the problem of change: Should we take seriously the cautions of Foucault and Rancière? European Journal of Curriculum Studies, 2(1), 191–205.
- Popkewitz, T. S. (2013). The sociology of education as the history of the present: Fabrication, difference and abjection. Discourse: Studies in the cultural politics of education, 34(3), 439–456.
- Popkewitz, T. S. (2010). The limits of teacher education reforms: School subjects, alchemies, and an alternative possibility. Journal of Teacher Education, 61(5), 413–421.
- Popkewitz, T., Olsson, U., and Petersson, K. (2006). The learning society, the unfinished cosmopolitan, and governing education, public health, and crime prevention at the beginning of the twenty-first century. Educational Philosophy and Theory37/4, 431–449.
- Popkewitz, T. (2004). The alchemy of the mathematics curriculum: Inscriptions and the fabrication of the child. American Educational Journal41/4:3-34.
- Popkewitz, T. (2004) Is the National Research Council Committee's Report on Scientific Research in Education Scientific? On Trusting the Manifesto. Qualitative Inquiry, 10 (1), 62–78.
- Popkewitz, T. (2002). How the alchemy makes inquiry, evidence, and exclusion. Journal of Teacher Education 53/3, 262–267.
- Popkewitz, T. (2000). The denial of change in the process of change: Systems of ideas and the construction of national evaluations. The Educational Researcher 29/1, 17–30.
- Popkewitz, T. and Lindblad, S. (2000) Educational Governance and Social Inclusion and Exclusion: Some conceptual difficulties and problematics in policy and research. Discourse: Studies in the Cultural Politics of Education. 21(1), 5-44.
- Popkewitz, T. (1998) Dewey, Vygotsky, and the Social Administration of the Individual: Constructivist Pedagogy as Systems of Ideas in Historical Spaces. American Educational Research Journal 35(4), 535–570.
- Popkewitz, T. (1998). The culture of redemption and the administration of freedom in educational research. The Review of Educational Research 68/1, 1-34.
- Popkewitz, T. (1997). A changing terrain of knowledge and power: A social epistemology of educational research. The Educational Researcher 26/9, 18–29.
- Popkewitz, T. (1997) The production of reason and power: Curriculum history and intellectual traditions. Journal of Curriculum Studies 29(2), 131–164.
- Popkewitz, T. and Brennan, M. (1997) Restructuring of Social and Political Theory in Education: Foucault and a Social Epistemology of School Practices. Educational Theory 47(3), 287–313.
- Popkewitz, T. (1996) Rethinking decentralization and state/civil society distinctions: the state as a problematic of governing. Journal of Education Policy 11(1), 27–51.
- Popkewitz, T. (1994). Professionalization in teaching and teacher education: Some notes on its history, ideology, and potential. International Journal of Teaching & Teacher Education 10/1.
- Popkewitz, T. (1988). Educational reform: Rhetoric, ritual, and social interest. Educational Theory 38(1), 77–94.
- Hoyle, E. & Popkewitz, T. (1985). Paradigm and ideology in educational research: The social functions of the intellectual. British Journal of Educational Studies 33(3).
- Popkewitz, T. (1985). Ideology and social formation in teacher education. Journal of Teaching and Teacher Education 1(2), 91–107.
- Popkewitz, Thomas S. (1983). The sociological basis for individual differences: The relation of the solitude and the crowd. In J. Goodlad & G. Fenstermacher (Eds.), Individual difference in school (NSSE Yearbook) 82(1), 44–74.
