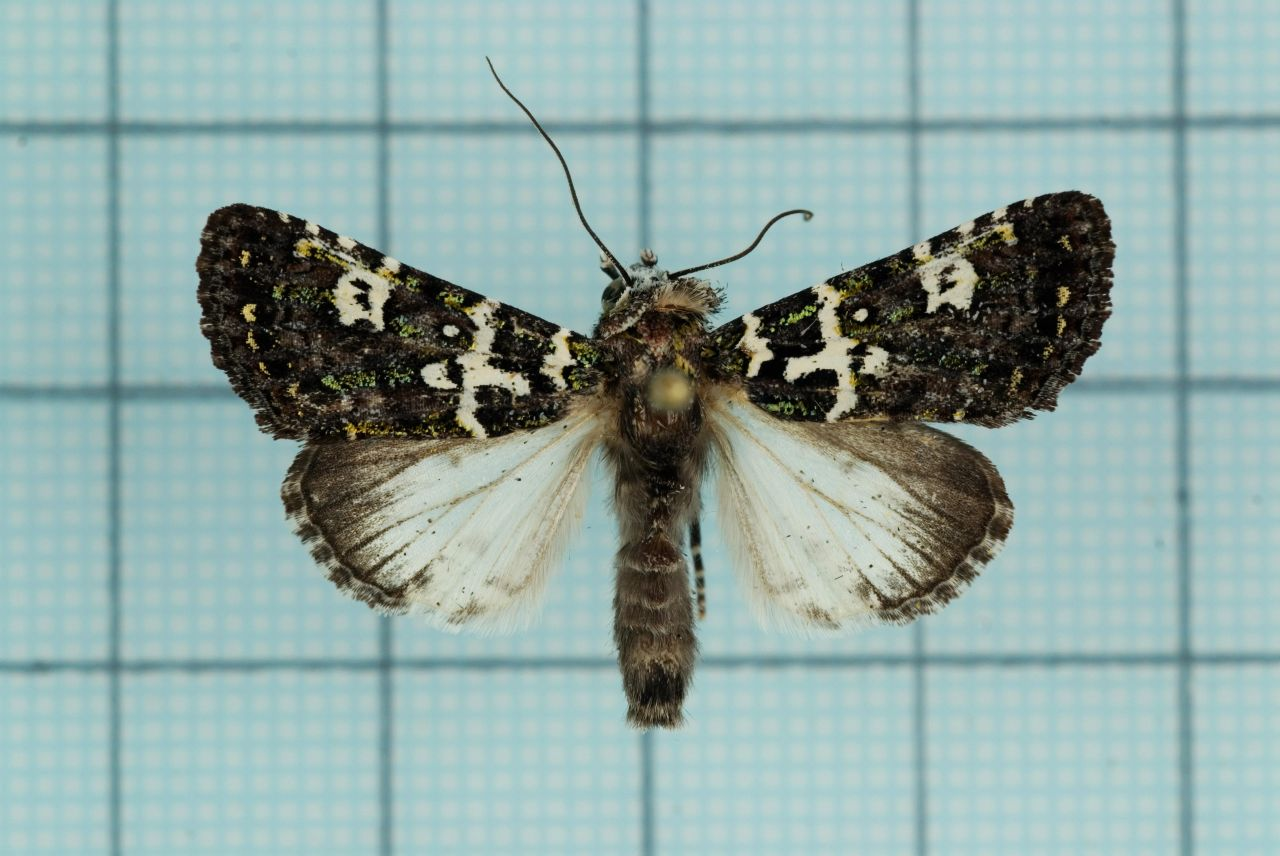

Scientific classification
- Kingdom: Animalia
- Phylum: Arthropoda
- Class: Insecta
- Order: Lepidoptera
- Superfamily: Noctuoidea
- Family: Noctuidae
- Genus: Karana
- Species: K. gemmifera

Binomial name
- Karana gemmifera (Walker, 1858)

Synonyms
- Plusia gemmifera Walker, 1858; Karana similis Moore, 1888

= Karana gemmifera =

Species of moth

Karana gemmifera is a species of moth of the family Noctuidae. It is found in India and Taiwan.
