= Julee =

Julee is a given name. Notable people with the name include:

- Julee Cerda (born 1978), American actress
- Julee Cruise (1956–2022), American singer and songwriter
- Julee Rosso, American cook and food writer

== See also ==
- Julie (given name)
