= Louis Makepeace =

British chef

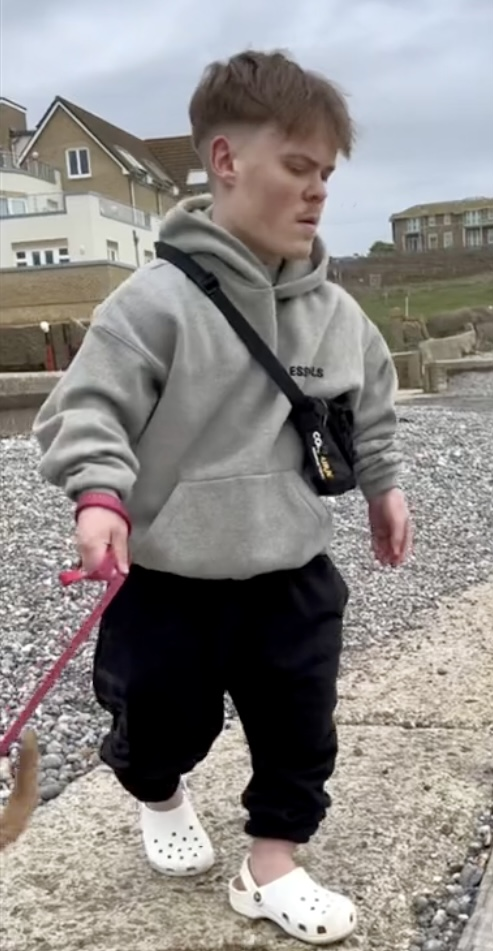
- Makepeace in the Isle of Wight, 2023
- Born: Louis Roger W Makepeace; April 2, 2000 (age 26); Worcester, Worcestershire, United Kingdom
- Education: Heart of Worcestershire College "(performing arts)"

TikTok information
- Page: Louis Makepeace
- Years active: 2022–present
- Followers: 117,000
- Last updated: March 2026

Louis Roger W Makepeace (born 2 April 2000) is a British internet personality with achondroplasia. Makepeace first gained attention in 2018 at the age of 18 when he hit national headlines after being refused a place on a cooking course at the Heart of Worcestershire College due to his height.

== Life ==
=== Early years ===
Makepeace was born on 2 April 2000 and has achondroplasia, a type of dwarfism affecting his limbs. He is 3 ft 10 in (1.17 m) in height.

=== "Health and safety risk" due to height ===
Makepeace gained national attention in 2018 after sharing that the Heart of Worcestershire College had refused him a place on a cooking course due to his condition and had claimed that he was a "health and safety hazard" and that he would cause "disruption" to the other fourteen students undertaking the course. Makepeace's mother, Pauline, reported that the college had told Louis that there was "no point in him doing the course as he would never be allowed to work in a commercial kitchen" due to his short stature.

Makepeace had branded the incident involving him and the college as "highly humiliating", saying that the rejection from the college had highlighted his differences amongst his peers and had "embarrassed" him for being short, along with making him question his future aspirations to become a chef. He claimed the college had told him that he would pose a risk to the other students in case he "got under their feet" and "in their way" which Makepeace described as "really humiliating".

After the controversy Makepeace claimed that his confidence was badly damaged. He felt that people "just stared and laughed" at him. He also noted that some people treated him as they would a small child, disparaging him by doing things like pushing in front of him in queues. Makepeace stated that all he wanted was to be able to "do normal stuff" without being laughed at because of his height.

In response, the college rejected the claims made by Makepeace and his mother Pauline and claimed that they had not discriminated against Makepeace because of his short stature. A spokesperson for the college said that Makepeace, after discussing the incident, had declined the college's new acceptance offer and had expressed that he no longer wished to study there.

=== Recognition following height controversy ===
Following national publication of the controversy between Makepeace and the college due to his height, Makepeace received attention from celebrity chefs such as Gordon Ramsay, who offered Makepeace an apprenticeship. Ramsay said the way that Makepeace had been treated by the college was "disgusting" and that he would "offer him an apprenticeship any day"

=== Cookery ===
On 13 September 2018 Makepeace began working as a chef in the Michelin star restaurant Pied à Terre, working alongside head chef Asimakis Chaniotis. In 2022 Makepeace appeared in the BBC Three cooking competition Hungry For It.

== Personal life ==
Makepeace is 3 ft 10 in tall. In a video posted to his TikTok account in April 2025, Makepeace states that his shoe size is a Junior Size 4. However, a video dating from 2023 shows a new pair of Crocs labelled Junior Size 3. This could be attributed to different brands having different shoe sizes.

== Filmography ==
- Hungry For It (Contestant, 2022)
