= School of Education (University of Wisconsin–Madison) =

University of Wisconsin–Madison School of Education
- Type: State university
- Established: 1930
- Dean: Marcelle Haddix
- Total staff: 1,067 (Fall 2021)
- Students: 2,788 (Fall 2021)
- Undergraduates: 1,619 (Fall 2021)
- Postgraduates: 1,164 (Fall 2021)
- Location: Madison, Wisconsin, USA; 43.0757167°N 89.4023°W
- Campus: Urban
- Website: education.wisc.edu

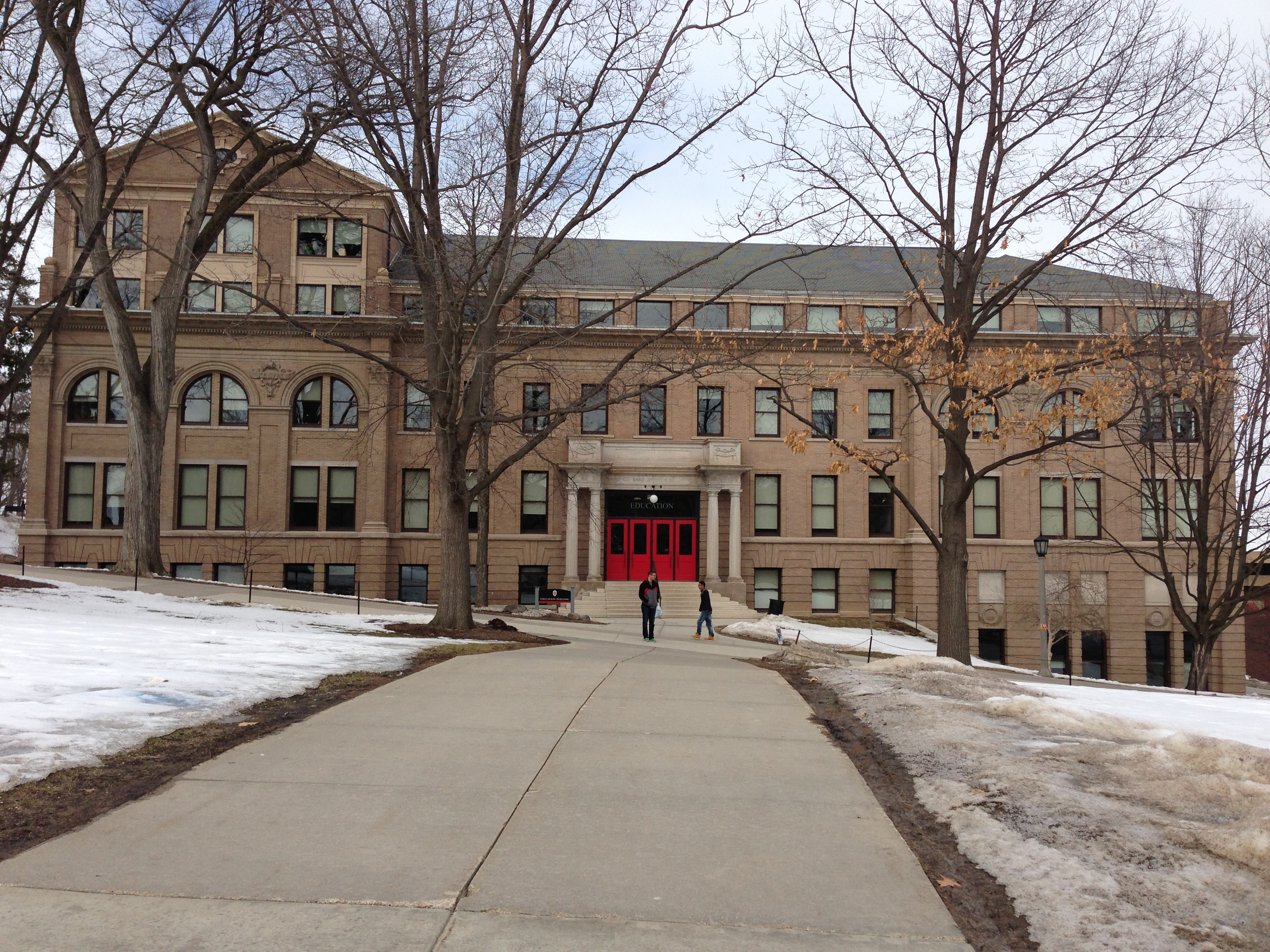
Education Building on Bascom Hill

The University of Wisconsin–Madison School of Education is a school within the University of Wisconsin–Madison. Although teacher education was offered at the university's founding in 1848, the School was officially started in 1930 and today is composed of 10 academic departments. U.S. News & World Report in its 2024 Best Education Graduate School rankings rated UW-Madison's School of Education No. 1 among public institutions. For the past 11 years, it has been ranked in the top five schools of education in the country. For 24 of U.S. News’ past 25 rankings, it has been in the top 10. UW–Madison is tied for the top spot with Teachers College, Columbia University. In addition to its No. 1 overall ranking, 10 graduate programs housed within the UW–Madison School of Education were highly-rated by U.S. News. That includes a No. 1 ranking for the Educational Psychology program.

Dean Marcelle Haddix became the school's tenth dean in August 2024, succeeding Diana Hess who served from 2015 to 2024.

== History ==
Before 1924, the UW School of Education was a small department within the College of Letters and Science. Public universities, including Madison, had been facing issues surrounding underclassmen attrition and education quality. While many parties asserted opinions, the leading voice for change was the University Board of Visitors, a university oversight board of prominent alumni that reported to the regents. The Board's composition during the twenties, led by Bart McCormick, lent towards alliance with professional educators. Their progressive priorities included increased educational efficiency through managerial reforms derived from scientific educational psychology research.

The Board studied national and statewide teacher education for a year, which culminated in their 1924 annual report's recommendation for the education department's independence. They felt that the department suffered from a lack of autonomy, and that its split would raise the standing of education training to that of other professions with independence (engineering, law, agriculture, and medicine). Professional educators and university administrators had previously disagreed on whether the structural change was necessary, though the annual report claimed widespread support and cited the precedents in Illinois, Michigan, and Minnesota. UW President Edward Birge did not act on the report.

In November 1927, new UW President Glenn Frank began plans for the School of Education. Its first director, psychology professor V. A. C. Henmon, had departed for Yale in June 1926 (Note: Henmon was wooed back to Wisconsin in 1927 as part of a new UW Bureau of Educational Records and Guidance, and with word that the study of psychology would leave the philosophy department's jurisdiction.) and had been against the School of Education's split. Henmon was replaced by acting director Willis L. Uhl, but Frank found Uhl's leadership inadequate for the impending changes and in April 1928 encouraged his departure. Uhl left for the University of Washington's education deanship in June 1928. Frank appointed an associate professor with whom he had been collaborating, Charles J. Anderson, to the directorship. In November 1928, a group from the Board of Visitors called for immediate progress towards a College of Education, and Anderson presented a plan to Frank and the Board of Regents on January 1, 1929. He presented a vision of Wisconsin teacher education where those trained at the existing nine teachers colleges return to the university after some experience to continue their education, and that the School of Education's independence would allow for the system's tighter integration. The five points of his argument were as follows:

#Education is now recognized as a profession.

1. Teachers trained wholly in liberal arts colleges are academic rather than professional in view point.
2. Public education sorely needs professional leadership.
3. Other professions have found it necessary to establish independent colleges in order to create a craft spirit.
4. Education needs the same opportunity.

— Charles J. Anderson, Memoranda re the School of Education to President Frank, January 1, 1929

His presentation was successful, which left Frank with the task of convincing the practice-driven education professionals and the scholarship-driven College of Letters and Science that Anderson's proposal struck the proper balance of theory and practice. Anderson suggested joint-appointments for professors in related major academic fields, and Frank suggested using a single budget line and staying within the College of Letters and Science, but neither was suitable. Their efforts were temporarily halted when College of Letters and Science Dean George Sellery publicly criticized Frank's pet project, the Experimental College. By the end of 1929, the three worked together towards a solution, and Sellery suggested bypassing the faculty balance concern by instead including all faculty who taught courses within the education major program. The "coordinate" school proposal circulated on January 31, 1930, as Letters and Science Document 44, and was unanimously approved by the college faculty in February and by the university faculty in April. The regents approved the proposal later in April, and the School opened for the 1930 academic year with Anderson as dean.

Historians E. David Cronon and John W. Jenkins wrote in their 1994 history of the university that the School gained esteem apace and remained close with the College of Letters and Science. They added that those relationships had endured to the time of print, and that the School's closeness with other faculty was idiosyncratic as compared to other American institutions of higher education.

=== Since 1930 ===
Julie Underwood served as the school's eighth dean for a decade before returning to the faculty in 2015 and eventually retiring in 2021. She was succeeded by Diana Hess who has served as the ninth dean of the School of Education since August 1, 2015.

== Departments ==
The School of Education offers a broad array of undergraduate programs that reflect the wide range of disciplines housed in the school. Although undergraduate majors are not offered in all departments, all ten departments do offer courses to undergraduate students. The school's departments include: Art, Counseling Psychology, Curriculum and Instruction, Dance, Educational Leadership and Policy Analysis, Educational Policy Studies, Educational Psychology, Kinesiology, Rehabilitation Psychology and Special Education, and Theatre and Drama.

Departments in the School of Education before its 1931 reorganization included: Educational Organization and Administration, Educational Measurements and Scientific Techniques, Educational Psychology, Educational Supervision and Methods, Elementary Education, History of Education, Secondary Education, Men's Physical Education and Athletic Coaching, Women's Physical Education, Professional Training of Teachers, Rural Education, Curriculum Construction, and Vocational Guidance and Vocational Education. The latter four were established in 1926, as was the undergraduate dance major (under women's physical education). A physical education master's degree program began for both sexes in 1927. After the 1931 reorganization through 1945, departments included Educational Organizations and Administration, Measurements, Statistics, and Scientific Techniques, Educational Psychology, Educational Supervision, Educational Methods, Elementary Education, History of Education, Philosophy of Education, Physical Education for Men, Women's Physical Education for Women, Instructional Procedures, Educational Sociology, Educational Curricula and Objectives, Guidance and Welfare, Special Fields (e.g., Home Economics Teaching), and Industrial Education. Art Education left Letters and Science to join the School in 1940.

== Facilities ==
Because of its wide range of departments, the School of Education is housed in many buildings throughout the UW–Madison campus. The Education Building, located in the heart of campus on Bascom Hill and built in 1900, originally housed the College of Mechanics and Engineering, but now mainly hosts education-centered curriculum; the Dean’s office; the Office of Equity, Diversity, and Inclusion; Student Services; Business Services; the Career Center; the Teacher Education Center; and the Global Education Office. The building was completely renovated by the end of 2010. The George Mosse Humanities Building is home to the Art Department, which has additional studio and gallery space in the Art Lofts. Kinesiology was formerly housed primarily in the Natatorium until its demolition in 2020, and will have a new home in the Bakke Recreation & Wellbeing Center (completed in 2023), and its Occupational Therapy program is located in the Medical Sciences Building and the Waisman Center. Dance is located in Lathrop Hall; Curriculum & Instruction is in the Teacher Education Building, which is also the home of Media, Education Resources, and Information Technology (MERIT), Professional Learning and Community Education (PLACE), and the Cooperative Children’s Book Center (CCBC); the Educational Sciences Building is home to the Wisconsin Center for Education Research (WCER) and a shared clinic area for Rehabilitation Psychology & Special Education, Educational Psychology, and Counseling Psychology.

== Journals and publications ==
Twice a year, the School's Office of Communications and Advancement publishes Learning Connections, a magazine for alumni and friends of the UW–Madison School of Education. The magazine features some of the great things happening within the School of Education and also provides alumni updates. Editions are available in online and printed versions.

== Notable faculty, past and present ==
- Charles Herman Allen, founder of the education department at the University of Wisconsin
- Michael Apple, educational theorist
- Gloria Ladson-Billings, educational theorist
- Harvey Littleton, founder of the American studio glass movement
- Thomas S. Popkewitz, educational theorist
- Lynda Barry, cartoonist and author
- Michelle Grabner, artist and 2014 Whitney Biennial curator
- Lisa Gralnick, metals sculptor
- Helen Lee, artist, glassblower, designer, and educator
- Diana Hess, Dean, University of Wisconsin–Madison School of Education
- Faisal Abdu‘Allah, artist, barber, educator

== Notable alumni ==
- Jane Kaczmarek, actress, Malcolm in the Middle
- Mark Tauscher, football player, Green Bay Packers
- Dale Chihuly, glass artist
- Linda Montano, performance artist
- Bruce Nauman, multimedia artist
- Iris Apfel, artist
- J. Shimon & J. Lindemann, photographers
- Truman Lowe
- Sherrie Levine
- Jane Hammond
- Chris McIntosh, former professional football player, athletic director at University of Wisconsin–Madison
- Jim Leonhard, former professional football player, interim head coach at University of Wisconsin–Madison
