= Murder of Julie Van Espen =

2019 homicide in Antwerp, Belgium

- Date: 4 May 2019
- Location: Antwerp, Belgium
- Cause: Strangling
- Perpetrator: Steve Bakelmans

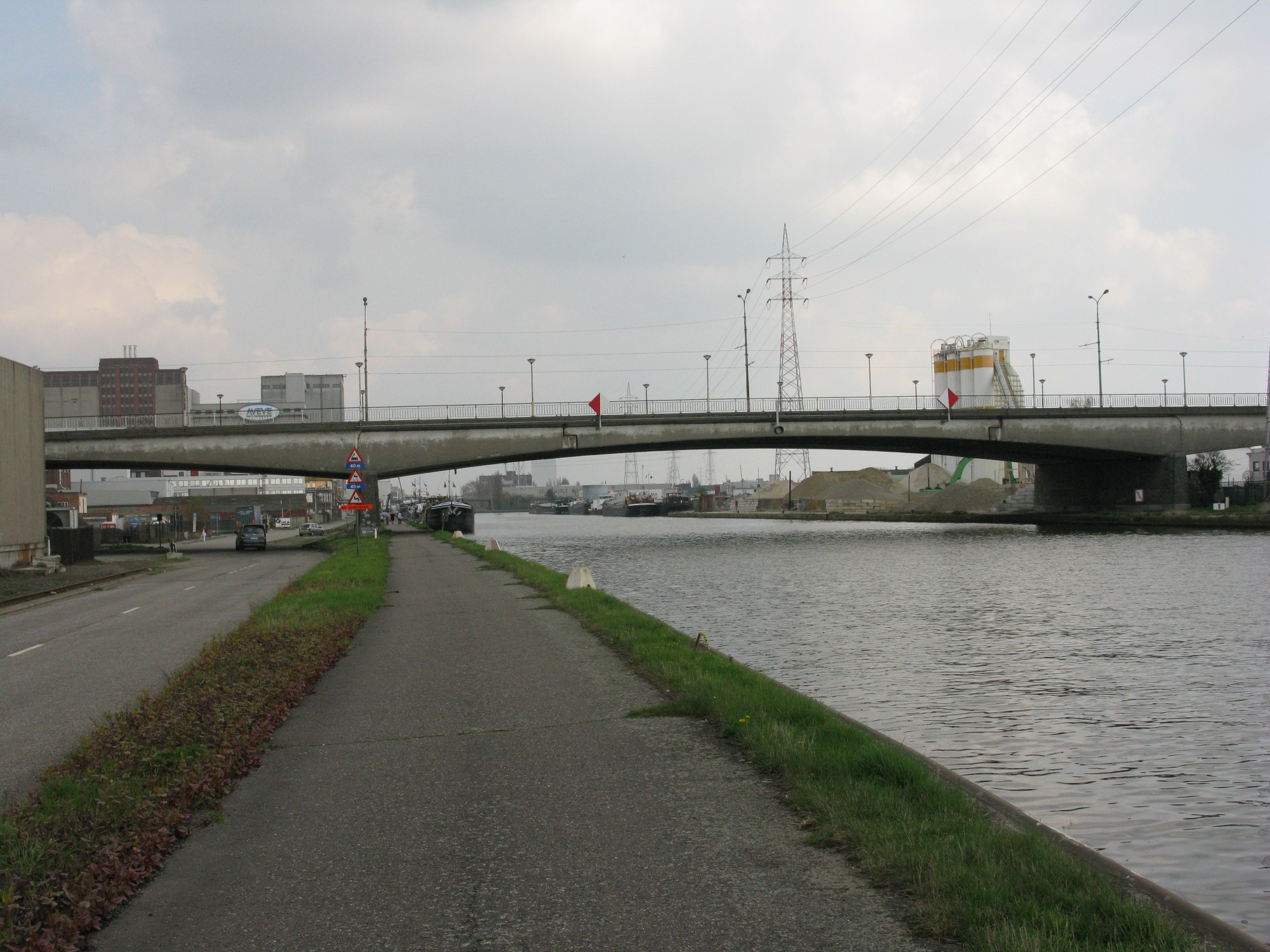
Gabriël Theunisbrug, under which the murder took place

On 6 May 2019, the body of Julie Van Espen (27 February 1996 – 4 May 2019), a 23-year-old Belgian woman, was found in the Albert Canal, Antwerp, Belgium. That same day, police arrested 39-year-old Steve Bakelmans on suspicion of her murder; in custody, he confessed he had killed her after attempting to rape her. The case has led to political protests against sexual violence.

== Events ==
On 4 May 2019, in Antwerp, Belgium, according to reports, 39-year-old Steve Bakelmans, wanting to rape a random person, saw 23-year-old Julie Van Espen riding her bicycle. He pulled her off the bicycle and tried to rape her. When she fought back, he beat her until she stopped moving and strangled her. Leaving her body on the side of the road, he took her bicycle basket with him and walked to the training center of the Antwerp Giants. He was captured on CCTV; this footage was later used to trace him. Bakelmans dumped Van Espen's travel pass in one of the bins of the complex. Because her bicycle basket did not fit into the bin, he hid it in an alley. Later that night, he dumped her body in the Albert Canal along with her bicycle and her mobile phone. The body was found in the canal on 6 May. Some of Van Espen's clothing was found in the grass.

On the day Van Espen's body was found, Bakelmans was arrested by police in Leuven after the CCTV images were published in a public appeal as part of the investigation into Van Espen's death. In custody, he confessed to having killed her. He had previously served four-and-a-half years in prison for a series of offences, including rape, and, in 2016, he had been remanded again on suspicion of theft and rape, later being sentenced to four years' imprisonment. He had appealed and the case had been indefinitely postponed in November 2018. After he was arrested on suspicion of having killed Van Espen, police and prosecutors announced that they intended to use Bakelmans's DNA in order to see if they could link him to cold cases.

== Aftermath ==
The day after his arrest, Bakelmans' Facebook account was deleted due to hundreds of people sending him hateful messages. Minister of Justice Koen Geens cancelled the Midsummer party planned in Leuven "out of respect and compassion for the parents, family and social network of Julie" on 8 May. Social media users, including singer Belle Pérez and psychologist Goedele Liekens, condemned the assault on Van Espen, with hashtags such as "#enough", "#MeToo" and "#JulieVanEspen" being used to command attention to the case, to raise awareness on sexual violence, and to address that Bakelmans had been walking free while being convicted of rape twice before. Over 15,000 people walked in a silent march in Antwerp for Van Espen on 12 May. The "Partij voor de Poëzie" (transl. Party for Poetry) hung posters in locations around Belgium where women felt sexually intimidated, to denounce sexual violence.

On 18 May 2019 at Schilde, over 2000 people attended Van Espen's funeral: seven hundred relatives, friends and acquaintances inside the church, and around 1600 people following the service outside. During the church ceremony, relatives of Van Espen made a public request to change the name of the bridge near which her body was found to "Zonnebrug" (transl. Sunbridge) in her memory.

== Outcomes ==
On 21 December 2021 the jury of the Assize Court of Antwerp sentenced Bakelmans to life imprisonment, a release to the sentencing court of 15 years and a period of 20 years security.

In 2023 the family of Van Espen lodged a wrongful death claim against the Belgium state for systematic failures that could have led to their daughter's death. In December 2024, the state was found responsible.

=== Societal changes ===
The murder of Van Espen accelerated efforts in Belgium to prevent and address sexual violence at multiple levels of society. Key developments included:

- Judicial reforms: All magistrates are now required to receive training on domestic and sexual violence. Belgian rape legislation was amended to explicitly incorporate the principle of consent. Judges were also granted broader powers to order immediate detention when there is a risk of reoffending.
- Child sexual abuse: Certain forms of child sexual abuse were made not subject to statutory limitations, allowing prosecution regardless of how much time has passed.
- Support for victims: More than 200 lawyers received specialized training to assist victims of sexual violence.
- Recognition of femicide: Women's organizations called for formal recognition of femicide. In June 2023, the Belgian Parliament approved legislation defining femicide and enabling the collection of official statistics.
- Expansion of Sexual Assault Care Centres: Belgium increased the number of Sexual Assault Care Centres from three in 2019 to ten in 2023. These centres provide services such as reporting crimes, forensic examinations, and psychological support in a single location.
- Self-defence and resilience training: More courses for women and girls became available. Van Espen's family and friends helped establish the non-profit organization Pioen, which provides such training.
- Victim support organizations: New organizations, such as Punt vzw, were created to support survivors of sexual violence through peer support and counselling.
- Government coordination: An Interministerial Conference on Women's Rights was established to coordinate policy measures on issues including sexual violence.
- Criminal law reforms: Belgium revised its sexual offences legislation, increased penalties for rape, strengthened victim support mechanisms, improved risk assessment procedures, and created separate waiting areas in courts so victims and suspects do not have to wait together.
- Action plans and prevention: Flemish authorities adopted a comprehensive action plan focusing on prevention, support for victims and perpetrators, and improved training for professionals such as teachers and general practitioners.
- Judicial reform campaign: Van Espen's family launched Mission Julie/Mission Justice, advocating for far-reaching reforms of the Belgian justice system and greater accountability within the judiciary.

Overall, the case became a catalyst for major legal, institutional, and societal changes in Belgium concerning sexual violence, victim protection, and justice reform.

== Commemorations ==
Van Espen's murder triggered a profound public reaction across Belgium. Thousands of people participated in silent vigils, memorial gatherings, and marches in cities including Antwerp, Bruges, Kortrijk, Hasselt, Leopoldsburg, and Brasschaat. On 12 May 2019, approximately 15,000 people joined a silent march in Antwerp. The event was widely compared to the White March of 1996, which followed the Dutroux case. Numerous sporting events, university ceremonies, climate marches, and public gatherings observed moments of silence in her memory. Football supporters, basketball fans, students, and local communities held tributes, often marking the 23rd minute of events because Van Espen was 23 years old.

2019

- Her football club permanently retired her number 3 shirt.
- Poems about sexual violence inspired by her case appeared across Belgium.
- Memorial ceremonies took place throughout the year.
- A photography and fashion exhibition addressing sexual violence was organized in Hasselt.
- A commemorative artwork was unveiled in Antwerp.
- To honour Van Espen's memory, her family and best friend organized an open commemorative gathering in her beloved park, Rivierenhof.

2020

- Her parents created an Instagram page dedicated to her memory.
- Due to the COVID-19 pandemic, the campaign "Bloom for Change" replaced large public marches.
- Singer Olivia Trappeniers released the song Home, inspired by the emotions surrounding Van Espen's death.
- Television program Telefacts broadcast a special documentary on the case.
- Dutch author Ellen De Vriend published Blond op Bonaire, dedicated to Van Espen and other victims of sexual violence.
- Street art and murals commemorating Van Espen were created near the location where she was killed.
- The theatre production #ENOUGH, targeting secondary school students, used Van Espen as inspiration for its main character.

2021

- During the trial concerning the murder of Sofie Muylle, lawyers and family members wore masks bearing Van Espen's image in honour of all victims of sexual violence.
- A three-part podcast series about the case was released.
- Poet Maud Vanhauwaert wrote a poem inspired by Van Espen.
- A newly constructed bridge replacing the original bridge included a peony (Van Espen's favourite flower) cast into one of its concrete pillars.

2022

- Author Diane Broeckhoven, working with Van Espen's mother, published Je fluistert in mijn oor ("You Whisper in My Ear"), a book dedicated to Van Espen's memory. Proceeds from the book were donated to organizations supporting victims of sexual violence.
- The murder became a case study referenced in Belgian legal literature.
- Memorial events continued under the name "Shine a Light."

2023

- Several Belgian politicians took part in self-defence and resilience training activities held in Van Espen's memory.
- Annual commemorations continued in Antwerp's Rivierenhof park.

2024

- Van Espen's 28th birthday was commemorated by family and friends at her grave.
- A star in the restored Rubens Chapel of Antwerp's Saint James' Church was dedicated to Van Espen and all victims of femicide.
- The annual Shine a Light memorial event continued.

2025

- On the sixth anniversary of Van Espen's death, her family called for 4 May to become a national "Day of Justice."
- The annual Shine a Light commemoration was held once again.

== See also ==
- Lists of solved missing person cases
