= The Political Classroom =

2014 book

- First edition
- Authors: Diana Hess, Paula McAvoy
- Publisher: Routledge
- Publication date: 2014
- Pages: 246
- ISBN: 9780415880992

The Political Classroom: Evidence and Ethics in Democratic Education is a 2014 book by Diana Hess and Paula McAvoy on the role of politics in American classrooms, both in teaching controversial issues and teachers sharing their own views. It is based on a study of 1000 students across 35 schools and 21 teachers between 2005 and 2009.
