= Julie Seitter =

American actress

Julie Seitter (née Julie Stinneford) is a professional voice actress who can be heard as "Julie". It is the interactive voice response agent for Amtrak's automated information and reservation telephone system. Julie's voice personality, described as "spunky", "perky", "unshakably courteous", and "reassuring"—has been cited as one of the reasons for the success of the Amtrak system. Upon the automated system's confirmation of a caller's spoken instruction, Seitter's recorded voice would intone, "Great!" or "Got it!". A speech recognition failure might prompt the message, "I'm sorry, I'm having trouble understanding you..."

On Valentine's Day in 2002, Seitter's voice was featured, in character, in a humorous National Public Radio story, and Seitter's Amtrak persona was parodied in a recurring Saturday Night Live sketch in 2005–2006, with Rachel Dratch as "Julie". Seitter made a one-time appearance on Jeopardy! as a contestant on February 28, 2006. As of 2008, Seitter resided in Littleton, Massachusetts with her husband and two children.

== Amtrak agent ==
The speech recognition-based Amtrak system using recordings of Julie's voice as an automated reservation agent was premiered in April 2001. Soon garnered a caller approval rating of over 90% while saving the railway system an estimated more than $13 million. Seitter recorded herself for the "Julie" system (which the rail network named for her) working out of a basement studio in her Massachusetts home. She later moved, and now works out of a room in the attic of a new house.
