= Yulie (given name) =

Yulie (alternatively spelled Yuli) is a given name in multiple languages, including Spanish and Hebrew.

In Hebrew, Yulie (יולי) is a gender-neutral name that translates to "July." In 2015, it was the 99th most popular feminine name in Israel.

== People ==
- Yulie Cohen (born 1956), Israeli filmmaker
- Yuli Edelstein (born 1958), Israeli politician
- Yuli Ofer (1924-2011), Israeli businessman
- Yuli Tamir (born 1954), Israeli politician
