= Julie Tremble =

Canadian artist

Julie Tremble is a French-Canadian artist living in Montreal, Quebec. She has held coordinating positions in a variety of cultural organisations in Quebec and Ontario. Since 2015, she has headed Vidéographe, the Montreal-based artist-run centre focused on moving images.

== Art ==
Tremble primarily works as an animator and in experimental video, with a particular interest in narration. Her work bridges the gap between abstraction and the reality of every day objects. It is part of a movement that includes Stéphane La Rue, Alana Riley and Pierre Ayot. As a professional artist, she has been represented by the Joyce Yahouda Gallery.

Tremble's work has been exhibited across Canada and internationally, and she is the 2013 recipient of Conseil des arts et des lettres du Québec (CALQ) award for best work in art and experimentation presented as part of the Rendez-vous du cinéma québécois. In 2014, her work was part of an exhibition at L'Occurrence Gallery, with the exhibition themed around friendship. She had a 2015 show called La colonne bleue. Tremble was also one of several artists featured in the Push and Pull exhibition, which ran in October and November 2016. Another one of her works was La capacité du télescope à choisir parmi les modèles de l'univers. The work was on display at the Galerie B-312 during a one night event featuring contemporary art in Belgo.

Her work was featured in the show Dead Web, which ran until early 2017. Her short 3D film titled BMP 37093 was part of the show. The filmed showed the death of a star and its subsequent transformation.

At the Magog River, one of her video works was also displayed. This work was created with Philippe Hamelin for Espace [IM]Média. The installation came about as a result of her work at the La colonne bleue show, where people inquired if she would be interested in doing outdoor installations.

== Professional activities ==
Tremble has held coordinating positions in a variety of cultural organisations in Quebec and Ontario. In 2009, she was the director at Le Laboratoire D'art. Since 2015, she has headed Vidéographe, the Montreal-based artist-run centre focused on moving images. Vidéographe is an artist run non-profit. As a representative of the organization, she was part of a CBC News discussing Dominic Gagnon's film of the north. The roundtable at Concordia University in March 2016 discussed the racist aspects of the film. With Vidéographe serving as the film's distributor, Tremble apologized for the offense caused by the film and said it had been removed from their archives. According to Tremble, this was done at the request of the artist and was not a form of censorship as a result.

La Revue HB, a Quebec-based, internationally circulated, print magazine specializing in drawing, was co-founded by Tremble and Jonathan Demers in 2013. The magazine is co-published by six Canadian artist-run centres. The magazine publishes original illustrations by international artists. HB No 6 (Hors Page) was accompanied by an exhibition at Centre Clark.

Since the fall of 2015, Tremble has held the position of Director at Vidéographe in Montréal. Her appointment was based on her work as coordinator of Montreal's open-access art centre articule and as director of Le Labo, the French-language art centre in Toronto. She has also gained experience through her work for Ontario's Media Arts Network.

== Background ==
Tremble is a French-Canadian living in Montreal, Quebec. She has a Master's in Film Studies from the Université de Montréal.

== Related reading ==
- Bachand, Nathalie; Isabelle Lelarge; Isabelle Lelarge (2016). "Lumière naturelle et image de synthèse. Laurent Lévesque, Julie Tremble et Philippe Hamelin". Etc Media (107): 34–41. ISSN 2368-030X.
- Tremble, Julie; Galerie du Nouvel-Ontario (2013). Julie Tremlbe: l'horizon des événements. ISBN 978-2-923024-58-5.
- Sans titre, in Catalogue Traduit, projet de l’artiste Carla Zaccagnini, Art Gallery of York University (AGYU), Toronto, Ontario, 2008
- L'Art, à toute fin pratique, (Mémoire de maîtrise), Université de Montréal, Montréal, Québec 2005
