= Jula (name) =

Jula may refer to the following people

Given name

- Jula (singer) (Julita Fabiszewska, born 1991), Polish singer and songwriter
- Jula De Palma (born 1931), Italian singer

Surname

- Emil Jula (1980–2020), Romanian football player
- Vasile Jula (born 1974), Romanian football player

== See also ==
- Yula (name)
