= Malvern Hills Arts and Community College =

Malvern Hills Arts and Community College / Malvern School of Art
- Worcestershire; England, United Kingdom

Information
- School type: General Further Education
- Founded: April 2021
- Gender: mixed
- Age: 16+
- Communities served: Malvern District

Malvern Hills Arts and Community College is a non-profit company set up in April 2021 to manage the bid to save the site of the former Malvern Hills College / Malvern School of Art from being sold to developers by its current owners who received the site for free as part of a merger in 2016. Known for a short while from 2009 to 2016 as South Worcestershire College (Malvern Campus), in August 2016 the college merged with Warwickshire College Group (WCG) and reverted to its historical name. The school was closed down in 2020 by WCG and a campaign, 'Save Malvern Hills College' was set up by arts students, staff, business leaders, councillors, community representatives and educators to try to save the important site and provision. The campaign gained the support of The Bransford Trust who pledged a large sum of money to the project and was followed by grants totaling £800,000.00 by local authorities. As yet no deal has been reached as WCG are keen to get a protective educational covenant overturned, against the community and local authority wishes, in order to maximise sale value. No date has been set for this court date yet.

== History ==
The college has its beginnings when it was first constructed as Malvern Technical College and School of Art in 1928 to provide a home for Malvern School of Art which was formed in 1886. It was purpose-built for such a type of provision and included specialist art studios, printmaking studio, jewellery & silver-smithing workshops, ceramics and sculpture workshops, an historic arts library, catering course facilities and a textile department amongst others. It provided some full and part-time vocational education for students aged 14–18 but was predominantly an adult education college focussed on arts and skills education. The college was a lifeline to the community from Malvern and beyond enabling arts & skills learning benefitting the students in so many ways from improved mental health, giving confidence to re-enter the jobs market, launch new careers and help social isolation. The total number of enrolled students for the Evesham and Malvern campuses of the former South Worcestershire College, together with the outreach locations, was about 7,000 of which about 10% were students aged 16–18 pursuing full-time education. In addition to the large majority of courses which were financed by the students themselves, the college was independently financed by the Worcestershire Local Authority which in turn was partly funded by a grant from the European Social Fund (ESF) to provide level 1 recognised national qualifications in Hairdressing, Motor Vehicle Maintenance and Repair, Engineering, Animal Care and Construction. The college had an Acquired Brain Injury Centre and also offered students NVQs and BTEC First, National and Higher National diplomas and certificates. and access to higher education programmes. ESOL courses are provided for Migrant workers and students needing English language support. The main provision at the college has always been arts education, predominantly funded by the students themselves. The facilities provided at the site are a rare example A 2006 Ofsted report accorded the school, under its former name of Evesham and Malvern Hills College, a Grade 2 (good), while a 2007 follow up report disclosed the college's firm intention to purchase the Malvern site and extend the facilities. Many of the suggestions in the 2006 report had also been addressed. The Evesham campus, now returned to its former name of Evesham College following the 2016 merger with the Warwickshire College Group and is located in Davies Road, Evesham.

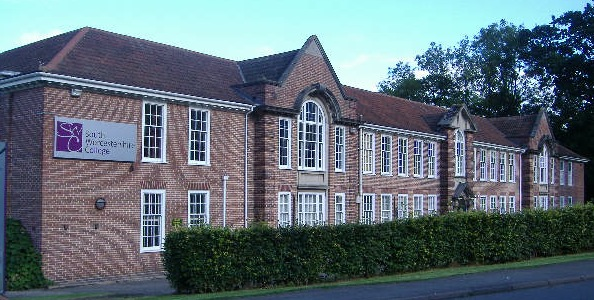
Malvern Hills College main building. Built 1928

The Malvern campus, which returned to its former name, is located in Albert Road North, Malvern and has been known as Malvern College of Further Education, (around 1965) then Malvern Hills College, until merging with Evesham College in September 2000 to become the Malvern campus for Evesham and Malvern Hills College in 2000, renamed South Worcestershire College in 2009. The college was operated by the Wyvern Trust, which was formed 1982 to manage and maintain the existence of Malvern Hills College when the site was purchased by Malvern Hills District Council following an unsuccessful attempt by the council of the former Hereford and Worcester county to sell the land and buildings. The trust was dissolved on the merger with Evesham College. The complex contains special teaching facilities and salons for hair and beauty therapy, art and crafts studios, workshops and the Malvern Community Learning Centre for adults.

== Closure ==
In November 2020 it was announced that Malvern Hills College would close down in the summer of 2021. A covenant on the buildings requires the site to be used for educational purposes, despite a bid from the community to save the college and Malvern Town Council appointing the college as an asset of community value, WCG continued with the closure.

WCG launched Malvern Hills Centre for Digital & Cyber Technology, on the Malvern Hills Science Park specialising in a limited offer of IT courses for adults. The centre opened in September 2021 but failed to recruit and closed.

In November 2021, following a protest and rally held in Priory Park, Malvern Hills District Council reaffirmed it commitment to uphold the covenant to continue education facilities at the Albert Road site.

Following a campaign 'Save Malvern Hills College' run by former students, staff, business leaders, councillors, educators & community representatives to save the school, a new non-profit company, Malvern Hills Arts & Community College Limited, was formed to take a bid forward to WCG . In addition to the money previously pledged by The Bransford Trust A grant of £400,000.00 from Malvern Hills District Council, was matched by a further grant of the same amount by Worcester County council. Together, the three funding partners are working with the newly created non-profit Malvern Hills Arts & Community College to try reach a deal with Warwickshire College Group to buy the site so that the community in Malvern & beyond can benefit from the college.

== Further use ==
Following a ruling in favour of Warwickshire Colleges Group by a High Court judge on 14 June 2023, Malvern Hills District Council was forced to back down on the covenant which insists that the Malvern Hills College campus always be used for an educational purpose, effectively opening the possibility for the site to be sold for housing development.
