= Telefacts =

- Title screen
- Genre: Current affairs
- Presented by: Birgit Van Mol, Freek Braeckman
- Theme music composer: Peter Meyvaert
- Country of origin: Belgium
- Original language: Dutch

Production
- Producer: Medialaan
- Production location: Vilvoorde

Original release
- Network: VTM
- Release: 1 February 1990

Telefacts is a Belgian current affairs programme that has been broadcast weekly on the Belgian television channel VTM since 1 February 1990. It shows documentaries about a wide variety of issues, most of them being widely known recent events. The programme is made in collaboration with VTM Nieuws and sometimes gives in-depth analysis to certain current events.

Reports purchased from foreign broadcasters are sometimes broadcast as part of Telefacts; between 2010 and 2015 a spin-off programme dedicated to these reports was broadcast, allowing the main programme to focus on domestically produced content.

The name Telefacts is a play on words, referring to the telefax, which was still a widely used means of communication when the programme began in 1990, and the programme's factual subject matter (facts), broadcast on television (tele).
