= Julie Tristan =

American journalist

Julie Tristan is an American radio & television personality from St. Louis, Missouri.

== Career ==
Tristan is the host of "Julie & Friends" on 102.5 KEZK-FM. She is also the midday host on KYKY-FM. She's also an MMJ Reporter, Anchor, Producer for HEC Media's "Spotlight STL" airing on KPLR 11 Sundays at 9:30am. She also runs a production company 8 Dogs Video where she is a freelance videographer/editor/host.

Previously Tristan was the host of "The Wake Up with Bret & Julie" on Y98. She was also the afternoon on-air talent on 102.5 KEZK. She was the interim night DJ on Y98 from 7pm-Midnight. Tristan hosted "Billy & Julie in the Morning" on 103.3 KLOU. She was also the host of "Show Me St. Louis" at KSDK-TV, the NBC affiliate in St. Louis, Missouri. She is also a radio host on the weekends for WARH 106.5 The Arch. Tristan previously was a reporter & weekend anchor at KOMU-TV, the NBC affiliate in Columbia, Missouri. Tristan, a St. Louis native, also worked at Clear Channel Radio-Total Traffic as a traffic reporter and voice-over talent for Oldies 103.3 KLOU-FM, KMJM-FM Magic 104.9 & KATZ-AM Gospel 1600. She then was the executive producer and co-host for the nationally syndicated Steve and DC Morning Show. She has also been an on-air talent for WVRV-FM 101.1 The River (Bonneville Radio).

=== Awards ===
Julie Tristan has won 4 Mid-America Emmy Awards

-In 2023 & 2024 she won in the "Magazine Program" category for "Spotlight STL".

-In 2022 Tristan was nominated for 3 Mid-America Emmy Awards, 2 in the "Magazine Program" category for "Spotlight STL" from HEC Media & 1 for "Societal Concerns-Short Form Content" for her MMJ story about the “Second Chance Ranch”.

-In 2021 Tristan won 1 Mid-America Emmy Awards in the "Magazine Program" category for being a producer/host/MMJ for "Spotlight STL" with HEC Media.

-In 2020 Tristan won 2 Mid-America Emmy Awards, 1 in the "Magazine Program" category for "Spotlight STL" and 1 in "Public/Current/Community Affairs" for her MMJ story about "The Onion House" with HEC Media

In 2012 Tristan was nominated for a Mid-America Emmy Awards in the “On-Camera Talent: Performer/Host” category.

-Audacy STL Star of the Quarter for excellence in creativity, community & communication

-”Best Social Integration” iHeartRadio Influencers Awards

-"Philanthropist Of The Year", Gateway Pet Guardians Animal Rescue

-“Spirit of Hope Award”, along with co-workers American Cancer Society

-$50,000 Grant winner, Petco

-iHeartMedia Leader in the Workplace

-KSDK-TV “Star of the Week”

== Education ==
Tristan grew up in Creve Coeur and attended Pattonville High School. After realized she "didn’t want to study to be a surgeon at SLU after I took biology and had to dissect a frog; she earned her Bachelor of Journalism degree from University of Missouri.
