= Yula (moth) =

Scientific classification
- Kingdom: Animalia
- Phylum: Arthropoda
- Class: Insecta
- Order: Lepidoptera
- Superfamily: Noctuoidea
- Family: Noctuidae
- Genus: Yula; Bethune-Baker, 1906

Genus of moths

Yula is a genus of moths of the family Noctuidae.

== Taxonomy ==
Yula is treated as a valid genus or a synonym of Karana.

== Species ==
- Yula argyrospila (Warren, 1912)
- Yula moneta (Warren, 1912)
- Yula muscosa (Hampson, 1891)
- Yula novaeguineae Bethune-Baker, 1906
- Yula submarginata (Warren, 1912)
- Yula tenuilinea (Warren, 1912)
