= Jula Deh =

Jula Deh جولاده
- Village
- Location within Iran
- Coordinates: 36°30′17″N 50°08′12″E
- Country: Iran
- Province: Qazvin
- County: Qazvin
- Bakhsh: Alamut-e Gharbi
- Rural District: Rudbar-e Shahrestan

Population (2006)
  - Total: 67
- Time zone: UTC+3:30 (IRST)
  - Summer (DST): UTC+4:30 (IRDT)

Jula Deh (Persian: جولاده, also Romanized as Jūlā Deh; also known as Jolfā Deh) is a village in Rudbar-e Shahrestan Rural District, Alamut-e Gharbi District, Qazvin County, Qazvin Province, Iran. At the 2006 census, its population was 67, in 24 families.
