= Julie Stevens =

Julia or Julie Stevens may refer to:

- Julie Stevens (American actress, born 1916) (1916–1984), American performer on Broadway and on radio
- Julie Stevens (English actress) (1936–2024), British actress, singer and television presenter
- Julie Stevens (American actress and singer) (born 1967), started as child performer in 1979's Annie
- Julia Ruth Stevens (1916–2019), adopted daughter of American baseball player Babe Ruth
- Julia Stevens, Canadian politician in 1995 New Brunswick general election#Southeastern New Brunswick
