= Julie Kenny =

British businesswoman (1957–2025)

Dame Julie Kenny DBE DL
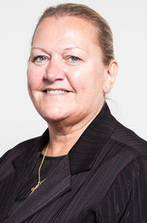
- Born: 19 August 1957; Sheffield, South Yorkshire, England
- Died: 21 February 2025 (aged 67); Doncaster, South Yorkshire, England
- Occupation: Businesswoman

Dame Julie Ann Kenny (19 August 1957 – 21 February 2025) was an English businesswoman who was the interim chair of the UK Commission for Employment and Skills and Chair of Trustees of the Wentworth Woodhouse Preservation Trust.

== Life and career ==
Kenny was born in Sheffield on 19 August 1957.

Kenny was appointed a Commander of the Order of the British Empire (CBE) in the 2002 New Year Honours for services to industry in Yorkshire and Humberside . Kenny also served as a Deputy Lieutenant for South Yorkshire from 2005. In 2006, she was awarded an Honorary Doctorate from Sheffield Hallam University.

In 2014, Kenny was announced as the Private Businesswoman of the Year.

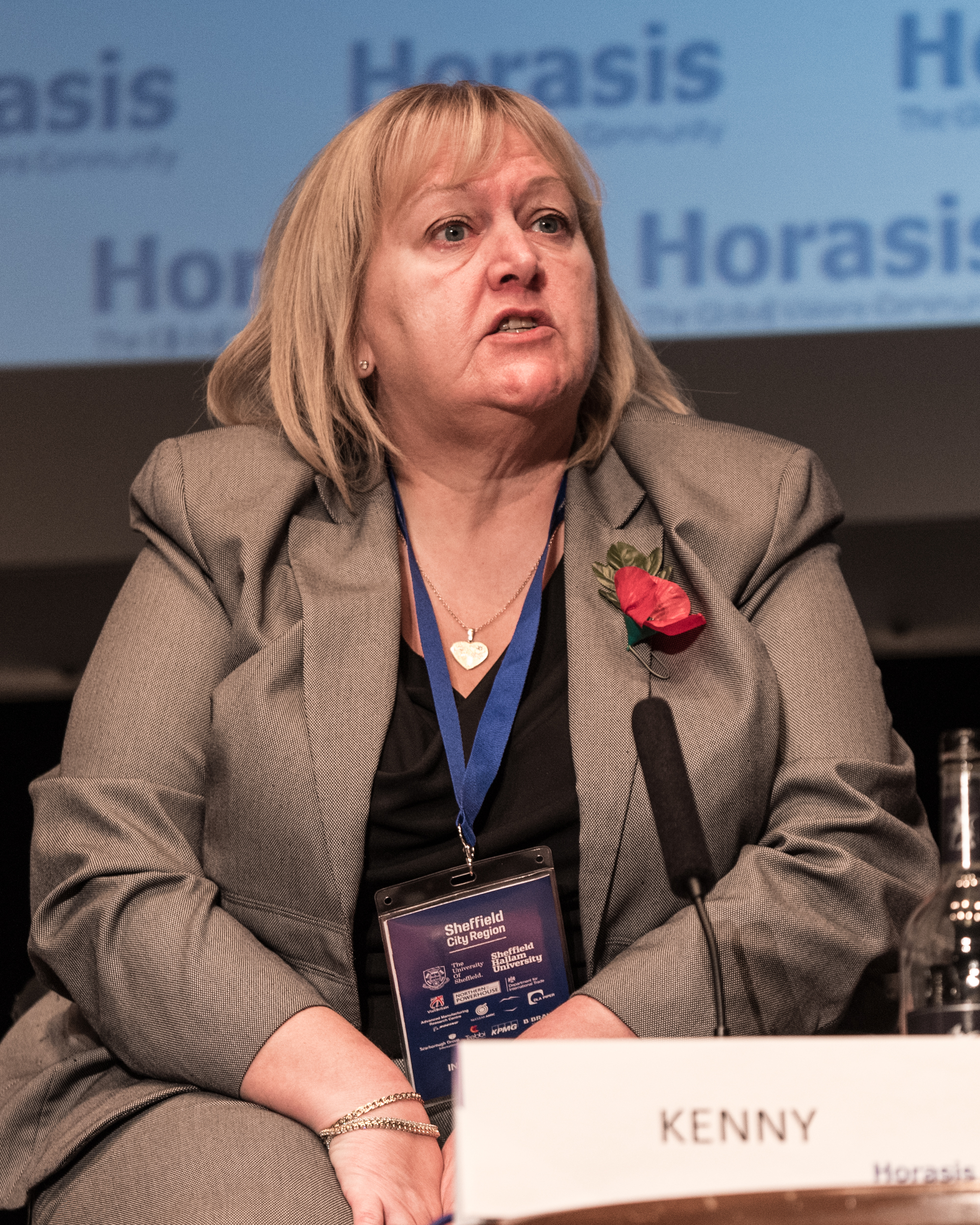
Kenny in 2017

Kenny was appointed a Dame Commander of the Order of the British Empire (DBE) in the 2019 Birthday Honours for services to heritage.

Kenny was appointed a commissioner of Historic England by the Secretary of State for Culture Media and Sport in February 2023.

Kenny died after a short illness at Doncaster Royal Infirmary, on 21 February 2025, at the age of 67.
