= WCG (college) =

Further education college based in England

Location
- Warwick New Road; Leamington Spa, Warwickshire, CV32 5JE; England; 52°17′17″N 1°32′56″W

Information
- Type: General Further Education College
- Established: 1996
- Department for Education URN: 130835 Tables
- Ofsted: Reports
- Gender: Mixed
- Age: 14 to 99
- Enrolment: approx. 15,000 students (full and part-time)
- Website: wcg.ac.uk

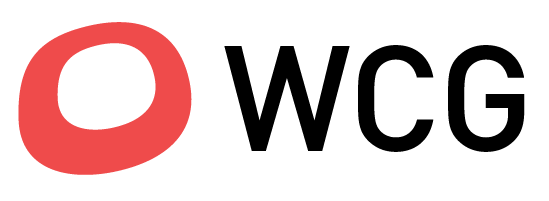
WCG logo 2016

WCG (formerly Warwickshire College Group and Warwickshire College) is the managing body that administers several colleges of further education in the English West Midlands, namely in the counties of Warwickshire and Worcestershire. Its most recent acquisition concerned its August 2016 merger with South Worcestershire College of which the two campuses then reverted to their historical names of Evesham College in Evesham and Malvern Hills College in Great Malvern. The merger makes it the largest group of further and adult education institutions in the country, and one of the five colleges in the UK empowered by the Privy Council with the authority to award foundation degrees.

As of June 2018 the group manages seven colleges with a faculty of around 1,500 staff for approximately 15,000 students. The group offers more than 1,000 courses over 20 areas of discipline with an A-Level pass rate of 98%.

== Colleges ==
Royal Leamington Spa College
Moreton Morrell College
Rugby College
Pershore College
Warwick Trident College
Evesham College
Malvern Hills College

The group provides National Curriculum courses and vocational education in a broad range of subjects to students aged 16 and over. It was formed in 1996 with the merger of Mid-Warwickshire College in Leamington Spa and Warwickshire College for Agriculture, Horticulture, Equine & Related Studies (formerly Warwickshire College of Agriculture) in Moreton Morrell and became Warwickshire College. In a further expansion, the college merged with Rugby College in 2003, followed shortly by a new campus opening in Warwick called the Trident Centre. It then merged with a fifth site at Henley-in-Arden. In August 2007, WCG merged with Pershore College, Centre of Horticultural Excellence, in Worcestershire, spreading Warwickshire College across the two counties. In 2014, each college was given an individual identity in that Warwickshire College Royal Leamington Spa Centre became Royal Leamington Spa College, part of Warwickshire College Group.

In 2016 a merger between WCG and South Worcestershire College took place, adding two further campus' in Worcestershire at Evesham and Malvern. At this point, it was decided that the college would trade as WCG to avoid conflicts between Warwickshire in the name, and three campus being in Worcestershire.

The college has Centre of Vocational Excellence (CoVE) awards in engineering, equine, farriery, maintenance and construction, and leadership and management. Following a March 2015 inspection, an Ofsted report accorded the college an overall Grade 2 (Good) for its performance. The college is a member of the Collab Group of high performing schools.

== Locations ==
=== Henley-in-Arden College ===
The Henley-in-Arden centre focused on sports-related studies, health and beauty, fashion and textiles and offered courses from further education right through to postgraduate qualifications. After a reassessment of the college's resources and the students demographic and locality, Henley-in-Arden College courses are now run at Moreton Morrell College and Royal Leamington Spa College in 2016, but gymnasium facilities still exist. On 23 October 2019 both WCG and Wasps RFC jointly announced that the centre would be sold to Wasps for use as a new training ground as it did not own one since moving into the region in December 2014.

=== Royal Leamington Spa College ===
The main campus for WCG is located in Leamington Spa. It lies to the west of the town centre, in the Milverton area of town. It offers courses including A Levels, business, health care, hair and beauty, construction, travel and tourism and supported learning programmes. The centre has a range of facilities, including a learning centre and library, a lecture theatre, hair and beauty salon, sports hall and gym, a travel centre, college shop and a children's nursery. The Leamington Spa centre is also the current home to Warwickshire School of Arts. The school of arts offers foundation diploma in art and design and extended/national diploma in fashion and clothing.

=== Moreton Morrell College ===
Located in the Warwickshire countryside, the Moreton Morrell centre offers courses in equine, farriery and blacksmithing, agriculture, countryside, arboriculture, environment, horticulture, construction, floristry, animal welfare and veterinary nursing. The resources include a 345-hectare commercial farm with a large dairy herd, beef and sheep, wildlife habitats including woodlands, grasslands and wetlands. The college also has equine facilities, with stabling for over 100 horses, an indoor school, a covered school and large outdoor riding arenas. There are three forges, purpose-built centres for horticulture and veterinary nursing, as well as a large animal welfare centre housing a wide range of animals and facilities.

=== Pershore College ===
Pershore College is situated on a 60-hectare (150-acre) site near Evesham, Worcestershire (though close to the Warwickshire border) and offers courses in Horticulture, Arboriculture, Animal Welfare, Veterinary Nursing, Agritech, Health & Social Care, Counselling and Sport. The resources include a commercial plant nursery, retail garden centre, fruit unit with fruit juice and cider production, amenity grounds, commercial glasshouses and vertical farm/agri-tech facilities. The college also manages 2 Plant Heritage National Collections in the popular and much visited College gardens. The college was home to the Royal Horticultural Society Regional Centre until 2019, and the site currently is the headquarters of the Alpine Garden Society. There is also a specialist animal unit.

Pershore College was originally an independent institution founded in 1954 to train horticultural workers in the Vale of Evesham. It began offering higher education courses in 1993 and was merged into WCG in August 2007.

=== Rugby College ===
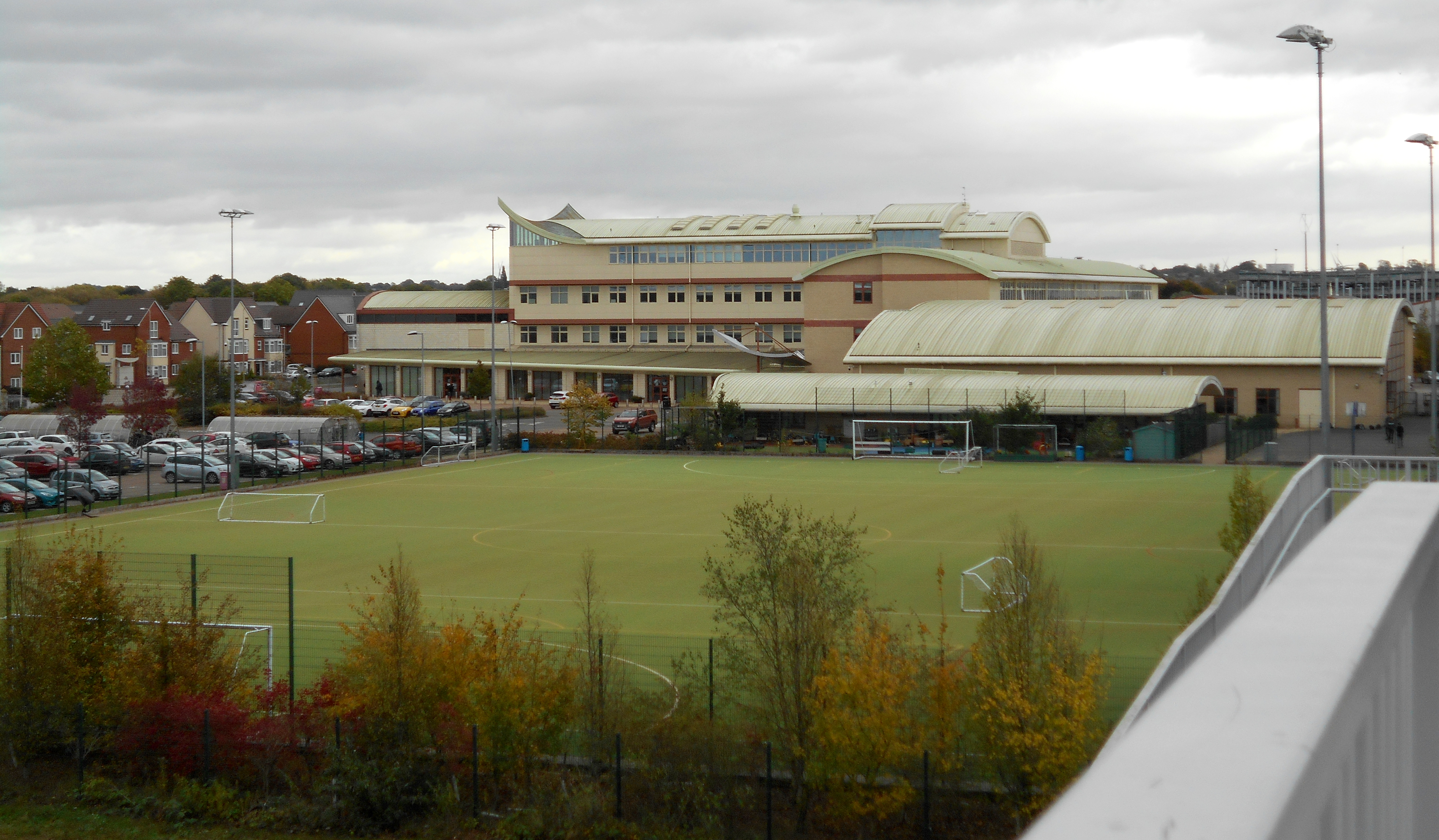
Rugby College

Rugby College of Further Education operated until 31 July 2003. It was dissolved by statutory instrument on 1 August 2003.

The Rugby centre's new building opened in 2010. It houses the Power Academy, to train people in power generation manufacture. The centre also includes a Learning Resource Centre, sports hall and gym, astroturf pitch, meeting and conference facilities, purpose-built art, design and craft workshops, hair and beauty salons, theatre and college nursery.

=== Warwick Trident College ===
The Trident Business and Technology Centre in Warwick was opened in 2003. It houses a canteen, classrooms, a workshop area, conference rooms and Learning Resource Centre. The Learning Resource Centre has an open learning area and internet enabled PC's. Many of the classrooms have computers for students to use. Multiple companies, including Alstom, Cable and Wireless, Jaguar Land Rover, Rolls-Royce and Telent, send their apprentices to Trident. There is a large workshop area for the Motor Vehicle courses with vehicles donated by manufacturers for use by the college and students to repair and maintain. There is a traditional engineering workshop, equipped with lathes, milling machines and grinding machines. There is also a materials lab along with electrical/electronic and pneumatics labs. The courses studied here are mainly engineering and motor vehicle based. There is also a 3D design area which has facilities for model making.

In 2015, Trident 2 opened, a specialist engineering building with workshops and labs tailored to the high demands of the colleges customers.

=== Evesham College ===
The Evesham campus has facilities including motor vehicle workshops, a hair & beauty training salon and energy training centre. It merged with Warwickshire College Group in August 2016 whilst part of South Worcestershire College and is now known as Evesham College, part of WCG.

=== Malvern Hills College ===
Malvern Hills College began as Malvern School of Art in 1886 and has continued this tradition since, being at the present site at the foot of the Malvern Hills in Great Malvern since the 1900s. Other facilities include the Malvern Community Learning Centre and dedicated hair and beauty salons. It merged with WCG in August 2016 whilst part of South Worcestershire College and is now known as Malvern Hills College, part of WCG. In 2020, WCG announced Malvern College would close in spring 2021 saying the campus had not been financially viable for a number of years, and blamed reduced adult education funding and shrinking student numbers. A local campaign to save the college has been formed, including civic leaders, local businesses and academics.

== Alumni ==
- Broadcaster Chris Beardshaw, garden designer, author and broadcaster, attended Pershore College
- David Domony, TV gardener and broadcaster, attended Pershore College
- Michael Burston (Würzel), guitarist of the group Motörhead, attended Pershore College in the mid-1990s
- Hussein Chalayan and Luella Bartley both studied for a National Diploma in Fashion and Clothing at WCG. Both went on to study at Central Saint Martins, and both have won British Fashion Designer of the year.
- Trina Gulliver, ten-time World Professional Darts champion, taught carpentry and joinery at the college until 2005
- Julie White, British businesswoman
- Kaleb Cooper, celebrity farmer
