= Julie Sanders =

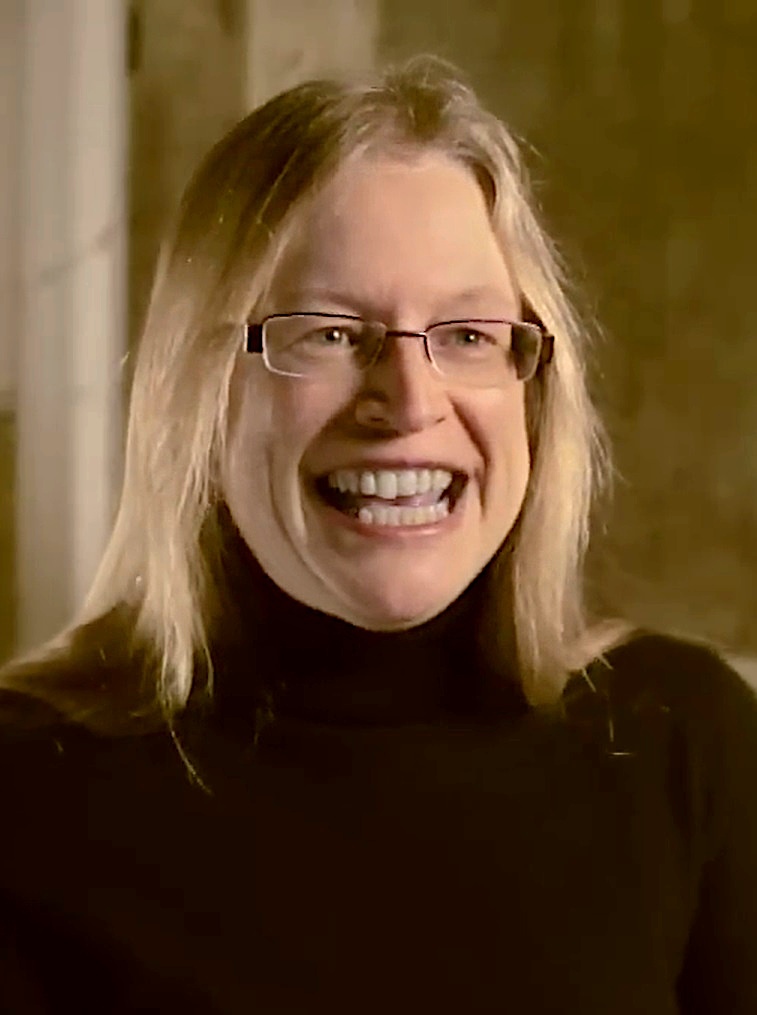
Julie Sanders - ShaLT 2013

Julie Sanders DL is the Principal of Royal Holloway, University of London.

== Career ==
Sanders gained her doctorate at the University of Warwick, and studied at Ca' Foscari University of Venice and at University of California, Berkeley. In 1995 she took a lectureship at Keele University and in 2004 joined the University of Nottingham as Chair of English Literature and Drama. She was Head of the School of English from 2010 to 2013 and was subsequently seconded for two years to the Ningbo, China, joint venture campus as Vice Provost, launching the Arts and Humanities Research Council's first centre in China for Digital Copyright and IT research. In 2015, Sanders was appointed Pro-Vice Chancellor for the Faculty of Humanities and Social Sciences at Newcastle University, and at the same institution she served as Deputy Vice-Chancellor from 2017 to 2022. Sanders was awarded the Rose Mary Crawshay Prize by the British Academy for international women's scholarship.

Sanders has been a member of the expert panel on BBC Radio 4's In Our Time for "The Anatomy of Melancholy", "The History of Metaphor", "Elizabethan Revenge Tragedy – theatre of blood", "The Metaphysical Poets – sex and death in the 17th century" and "Pastoral Literature – the romantic idealisation of the countryside".

She was appointed a Deputy Lieutenant of Surrey in June 2025.

== Selected publications ==
- Adaptation and Appropriation. The new critical idom. Milton Park, Abingdon, Oxon. 2016. ISBN 978-1315737942.
- The Cultural Geography of Early Modern Drama, 1620–1650. Cambridge University Press. 2014. ISBN 978-1107463349.
- Ben Jonson in Context. Literature in context. Cambridge University Press. 2014. ISBN 978-1107637092.
- The Cambridge Introduction to Early Modern Drama, 1576–1642. Cambridge Introductions to Literature. Cambridge, England. 2014. ISBN 978-1139004930.
- Novel Shakespeares: Twentieth-century women novelists and appropriation. New York. 2002. ISBN 9780719058158.
- Caroline Drama: The Plays of Massinger, Ford, Shirley, and Brome. Writers and their work. Northcote House, in association with the British Council. 1999. ISBN 9780746308776.
