= Yula (name) =

Yula is a given name and surname. Notable people with the name include:

- Özen Yula (born 1965), Turkish writer and playwright
- Selçuk Yula (1959–2013), Turkish footballer

== See also ==
- Jula (name)
