= Julie V. Lund =

American judge (born c. 1959)

Julie V. Lund (born c. 1959) is a juvenile court judge for Utah's Third District Juvenile Court; she serves Salt Lake, Summit, and Tooele Counties. She was appointed to the position by Governor Gary Herbert on November 9, 2010 to replace Judge Sharon P. McCully, who retired in September of that year.

== Education ==
Judge Lund attended Colorado public schools until her graduation from Basalt High School in 1977. She attended the University of Colorado at Boulder as an undergraduate. In 1981, Judge Lund graduated with a Bachelor of Arts in Political Science from CU-Boulder and then moved to Salt Lake City, Utah while her husband attended law school at the University of Utah. At her husband's urging she decided to go to law school and in 1983 she applied to and was accepted by the University of Utah's College of Law (subsequently renamed the S.J. Quinney College of Law). She graduated with her juris doctor in May 1986 and was admitted to practice law in the state of Utah on October 7, 1986. She is President-elect of the University of Utah S. J. Quinney College of Law Alumni Board (2003–present). During her teenage years, Judge Lund aspired to be a teacher and has been able to further her lifelong interest in children both during her career at the Utah Attorney General's office and now as a juvenile court judge.

== Legal career ==
After first practicing law in private practice at Green & Berry in Salt Lake City, in 1995 Lund joined the Child Protection Division of the Utah Attorney General's Office, where she stayed until she was appointed to the juvenile court bench. In 2000, she was instrumental in initiating the Family Dependency Drug Court for the Third District Juvenile Court. In 2001 she was promoted to Section Chief and in 2007 she became the Division Chief where she supervised the largest division in the AG's office. In 2003, Attorney General Mark Shurtleff named her Attorney of the Year, stating, "She works tirelessly to help reunite families affected by drug abuse. She is simply an outstanding attorney." During her tenure as Division Chief of the Child Protection Division she served on many committees that addressed important issues relating to children, including but not limited to the Standing Committee on Child and Family Law, the Child Welfare Parental Defense Oversight Committee, the Safety Model Task Force, and the USAAV Drug Exposed Newborns Committee. Judge Lund is a member of the Utah State Bar and throughout her several years' membership in that organization she served on several committees, including the Judicial Performance Evaluation Committee (1998–2005). She is also a member of the Salt Lake County Bar Association and serves on its executive committee. She has been a member of the Utah State Court's Court Improvement Program since 2007, serving on the Dual Adjudication and the Table of 6 Management Committees.

== Senate confirmation ==
On December 8, 2010 she was confirmed by the Utah Senate Confirmation Committee. At the confirmation hearings, she noted that she has been entrusted with the lives of the children of Utah and that the judicial decisions she makes will have lasting, long-term consequences not only for those that appear before her but for their family members, friends, and the community as a whole. She believes it is important that she remain open minded to hear and understand all sides of the issue so that she can make the best decision based on all information before her. During the confirmation interview, she spoke of an early experience at the Attorney General's Office that showed her how she could make a difference in children's lives. She also discussed her general philosophy on parental rights (she wants to keep families together and believes children do better when placed with family/extended family, but at the same time she believes that if parents are given opportunities to remedy the situation that brought them into court yet continue to fail to remedy the situation, then children deserve to move onto more permanent placement); her general philosophy on delays in court processes (we need to be considerate of people and respectful of their time ‒ attorneys and others that appear before her need to be ready to proceed on matters that have been set so they don't waste time and cause undue delay); and her belief that the Children's Justice Center provides a safe environment for children and also facilitates important training for professionals that interview children. At the conclusion of the confirmation interview, the committee gave unanimous consent for her appointment to the bench. and on December 14, 2010, the full Senate confirmed her appointment as a Juvenile Court Judge.

== Community involvement ==
Judge Lund is an active member of the community, lending her organizational and people skills to many organizations dedicated to advancing the lives of children and others in the community. She is a past-president of the Madeleine Choir School/Home & School Association, is a former Trustee of The Children's Center (1997–2003), was a member of the Utah Children's Justice Center Advisory Board (2004–2010), and for several years was a member of the Junior League of Salt Lake City (1994–2000). She is a former member of the Salt Lake Area Safe at Home Coalition (2003–2007) and volunteered for many school committees during her sons' school years.
