= Julie White (businesswoman) =

British businesswoman and entrepreneur (born 1967)

- Born: 1967 (age 58–59); Coventry, Warwickshire, England
- Education: Warwickshire College
- Occupations: Businesswoman, entrepreneur

Julie White (born 1967) is a British businesswoman and entrepreneur, who has risen to prominence after becoming the managing director of a multimillion-pound diamond drilling company. At the time she took control of Coventry-based D-Drill in 2008, she was the only woman to run a business of its type. White and her company have won several awards, both from her industry and the wider business community.

== Life and career ==
Born in Coventry, Warwickshire, she was raised in the city, and attended Warwickshire College where she studied business management. After graduating with moderate grades she went travelling around the world, working in a number of jobs in the process, including selling pizza on a beach and being the skipper of a yacht. On returning to the UK she studied NVQ qualifications in business, and started her first business in 2001. The company, Superfloor UK Ltd, introduced a new techniques for specialist floor preparation to the UK, and helped to establish her as a businesswoman in the Midlands. In 2008 she completed a management buy-out of D-Drill, a business her father had founded during the 1960s, at the time becoming the only woman to run a company of its type. Her father subsequently asked her to take over D-Drill from him. She felt she could only do so, however, if she bought the company. D-Drill's turnover fell by 40% during the first six months of her tenure, and she undertook a programme of restructuring and modernisation.

Under her stewardship, White has invested heavily in training and apprenticeships, continuing a strategy first implemented by her father, and underwent some training herself to better understand her business. According to a 2012 article by the BBC, D-Drill's spending on training was five times the industry average, while some 45 percent of the company's workforce was in the process of training, or had completed their apprenticeships with D-Drill. White wrote of her belief in the importance of apprenticeship training in an article for the Huffington Post in March 2013. "We have a responsibility to invest in our own company's future and, indeed, the future of our industry because we can all have the best policies, procedures and practices, without people none of that matters." In 2013 White won government support for her suggestion of a national database of apprentices, an idea she put forward to the Department for Business, Innovation and Skills after learning it was not possible for her company to obtain the contact details of recently qualified, but unemployed trainees, with a view to offering them career opportunities at D-Drill.

As of 2012 the firm was the UK's largest branch network in its industry, and has won contracts for work at London's The Shard, and the Vostok Tower in Moscow. Their work involved boring into the earth as part of preparations for the deep-rooted foundations required for the skyscrapers. D-Drill has sponsored the manager of Coventry City Football Club since 1983. White is a board member of the Drilling and Sawing Association, and is the first woman to be appointed to a professional body for the industry.

In late 2011 White took part in an eleven-day trek through the Himalayas to Mount Everest Base Camp to raise funds for Coventry-based explorer Mark Wood, who was planning to walk solo to both the South and North Poles. She appeared as a guest on the edition of 5 February 2012 of BBC Radio 5 Live's On the Money with Declan Curry, and on 21 June 2012 she was a panellist on the BBC political debate programme Question Time alongside guests including Justice Secretary Kenneth Clarke and Shadow Health Secretary Andy Burnham. The programme was recorded in West Bromwich. She appeared on BBC Breakfast earlier the same day talking about ways the government could help boost businesses. In January 2013 White was a guest on BBC Radio 4's The Bottom Line, where she talked about how she reshaped D-Drill.

== Awards ==
Since White took control of the company in 2008, D-Drill has won several industry awards for their work, including the prestigious Diamond Award from the International Association of Concrete Drillers and Sawers in February 2011. The firm picked up the award for its work in preserving a priceless 100-year piece of Royal Doulton tile art in Newcastle. In October 2011 she was also chosen as the Vitalise Businesswoman of the Year, previous recipients of which have included Karren Brady and Hilary Devey. She was shortlisted for the 2012 First Women Awards.

D-Drill was also the recipient of a Coventry Telegraph Business Award for its commitment to training and development. in April 2012 the company was honoured at the Specialist Awards, run by industry publication Construction News, while in April 2012 D-Drill became the first in its field to receive a platinum award in the Construction Standards Certification Scheme.
