= Jula Kamar =

Jula Kamar جولاكمر
- Village
- Location within Iran
- Coordinates: 33°42′57″N 48°26′17″E
- Country: Iran
- Province: Lorestan
- County: Khorramabad
- Bakhsh: Bayravand
- Rural District: Beyranvand-e Shomali

Population (2006)
  - Total: 73
- Time zone: UTC+3:30 (IRST)
  - Summer (DST): UTC+4:30 (IRDT)

Jula Kamar (Persian: جولاكمر, also Romanized as Jūlā Kamar, Chūlā Kamar, Jilu Kamar, and Jūlākamar) is a village in Beyranvand-e Shomali Rural District, Bayravand District, Khorramabad County, Lorestan Province, Iran. At the 2006 census, its population was 73, in 19 families.
