= Julie Robinson =

Julie Robinson may refer to:

- Julie Robinson (curator), Senior Curator of Prints, Drawings & Photographs at the Art Gallery of South Australia
- Julie A. Robinson (born 1957), U.S. federal judge
- Julie A. Robinson (biologist), NASA scientist
- Julie Anne Robinson, film and TV director
- Julie Martin (Neighbours) née Robinson (1964–1994), fictional character from the Australian soap opera Neighbours
