= Julie Choffel =

American poet

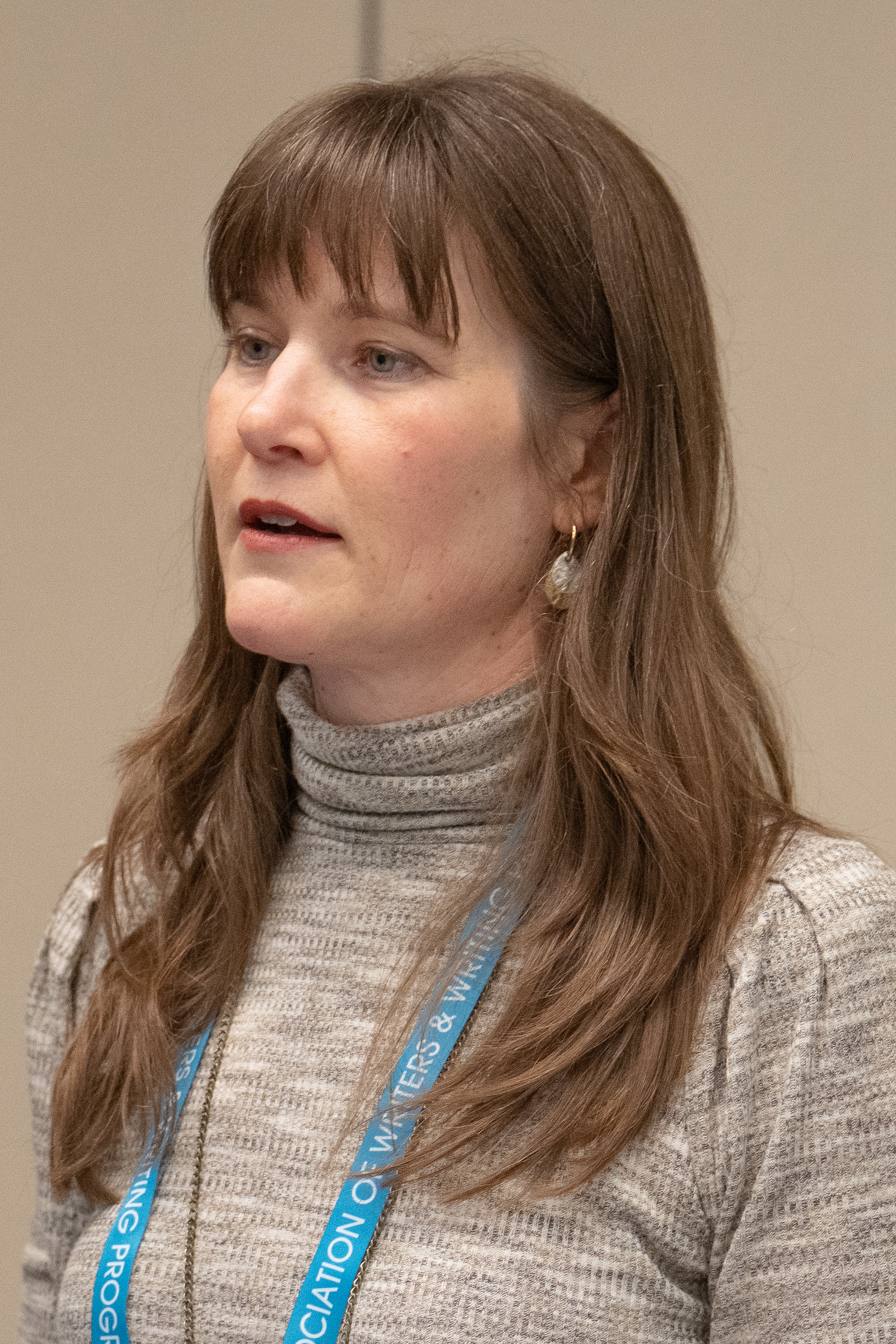
Choffel at AWP 2026

Julie Choffel is an American poet.

She was born and raised in Austin, studied geography at Texas State, and graduated from the MFA Program for Poets and Writers at the University of Massachusetts–Amherst. She teaches creative writing at the University of Connecticut and lives in Connecticut with her husband and their daughter.

== Selected works ==
Her first collection of poems, The Hello Delay (2012, Fordham University Press), was selected by Mei-mei Berssenbrugge for the 2011 Poets Out Loud Prize. Her poems have been published in Denver Quarterly, Fairy Tale Review, Make/shift, American Letters & Commentary, and elsewhere; and she is also the author of Figures in a Surplus (2011, Achiote Press), a chapbook.
