= Julie Buring =

American epidemiologist

Julie Elizabeth Buring is an American epidemiologist and professor at the Harvard T.H. Chan School of Public Health.

== Biography ==
Buring works with Harvard Medical School and Brigham and Women's Hospital. She is a professor in the epidemiology department at Harvard and also a professor at the Boston University School of Public Health. She is the chair of the Institutional Review Board of Harvard Medical School. She graduated from Pomona College (BA), University of Washington (MS), and the Harvard School of Public Health (ScD).

=== Research ===
The focus of Buring's research is the prevention of cardiovascular disease and cancers in women. She connects risk factors such as stroke and blood pressure into her investigation of cardiology. Two of her most well-known clinical trials are a randomized trial of low-dose aspirin and vitamin E in the primary prevention of cardiovascular disease and cancer, along with the use of vitamin D in the prevention of cardiovascular disease and cancer.

=== Awards ===
Buring received an honorary doctorate from Pomona College. She received the John Snow Award in Epidemiology from the American Public Health Association.
