= Julie Underwood =

Julie K. Underwood
- Education: B.A. in Political Science, DePauw University Ph.D. in Educational Leadership, University of Florida J.D., Indiana University Bloomington
- Occupations: Professor; dean; attorney
- Known for: Former Dean of the University of Wisconsin School of Education; Former General Counsel for the National School Board Association

Julie K. Underwood is a former dean of the University of Wisconsin School of Education and is the first woman to lead UW's School of Education as dean. She served in her role as dean of UW's School of Education from August 2005 to July 2015.

== Biography ==
Underwood received her bachelor's degree in Political Science from DePauw University in 1976, her law degree from Indiana University School of Law in 1979, and her Ph.D. in Educational Leadership from the University of Florida in 1984. Early in her career as an attorney, she worked at the Wisconsin Department of Public Instruction (DPI) in a number of positions, including State Hearing Officer, State Reviewing Officer, and Interim General Counsel.

Underwood served on the faculty of the Department of Educational Administration (now Educational Leadership and Policy Analysis) at University of Wisconsin–Madison from 1986 to 1995. There in 1994, she received the Emil H. Steiger Award for Excellence in Teaching. She then left Madison, Wisconsin to serve as dean of Miami University's School of Education and Allied Professions (now School of Education, Health & Society) from 1995 to 1998 and then as Associate Executive Director and General Counsel for the National School Boards Association (NSBA) in Washington, DC and Alexandria, Virginia from 1998 to 2005.

At the NSBA, she led a legal advocacy program on behalf of the nation's public school boards, a responsibility that included presenting friend-of-the-court briefs and legal strategies before the U.S. Supreme Court and lower courts. She also was responsible for the 3,000-member Council of School Attorneys.

At University of Wisconsin–Madison, Underwood has served as chair of the Department of Educational Administration (1993–94), where she became the first woman to earn tenure in that department; Associate Dean of the School of Education (1994–95); Co-Director of the Wisconsin Center for Education Policy at the Robert M. La Follette Institute of Public Affairs (1990–93) and eventually the first woman to be the Dean of the School of Education. She served in this role for a decade, from 2005 to 2015. She then returned to her faculty position as a tenured professor at UW-Madison in both the School of Education and the Law School. She served as interim provost at the university from January 2009 to July 2009.

From 2017 to 2019 Underwood served on the Blue Ribbon Commission for School Funding, a bi-partisan legislative and expert commission that was taking a comprehensive look at the Wisconsin public school funding formula.

Underwood is also the Board President for the Wisconsin Alliance for Excellent Schools, the financial arm of the Wisconsin Public Education Network. The Network received the prestigious "Friend of Education Award" from DPI in 2018.

She co-authored several books, including School Law for Teachers (Prentice Hall, 2006), Legal Aspects of Special Education and Pupil Services (Boston: Allyn & Bacon, 1995), and The Principal’s Legal Handbook (Education Law Association, 1993). She also writes a monthly column for Phi Delta Kappan, a professional magazine that publishes articles and editorials in the field of education, and has several other publications in Educational Horizons and The Nation, among many others.

== Amicus briefs in U.S. Supreme Court cases ==
Underwood has also written amici briefs to the U.S. Supreme Court and argued before the Court in several hallmark cases, including:

- Garcetti v. Ceballos, 547 U.S. 410 (2006);
- Schaffer v. Weast, 546 U.S. 49 (2005);
- Jackson v. Birmingham Board of Education, 544 U.S. 167 (2005);
- American Civil Liberties Union of Kentucky v. McCreary County, Kentucky, 545 U.S. 844 (2005);
- Elk Grove Unified School District v. Newdow, 542 U.S. 1 (2004) (also on oral argument team);
- Locke v. Davey, 540 U.S. 712 (2004);
- Gratz v. Bollinger, 539 U.S. 244 (2003) (coordinator for K-12 amicus parties);
- Grutter v. Bollinger, 539 U.S. 306 (2003) (coordinator for K-12 amicus parties);
- United States v. American Library Association, 539 U.S. 194 (2003);
- Gonzaga University v. Doe, 536 U.S. 273 (2002);
- Board of Education of Independent School District No. 92 of Pottawatomie County v. Earls, 536 U.S. 822 (2002) (also on oral argument team);
- Zelman v. Simmons-Harris, 536 U.S. 639 (2002) (also on oral argument team);
- Owasso Independent School Dist. No. I-011 v. Falvo, 534 U.S. 426 (2002) (also on oral argument team);
- Good News Club v. Milford Central School, 533 U.S. 98 (2001) (also on oral argument team);
- Mitchell v. Helms, 530 U.S. 1296 (2000) (also on oral argument team);
- Davis v. Monroe County Bd. of Educ., 526 U.S. 629 (1999) (also on oral argument team).

== Articles ==
Some of Underwood's recent intellectual contributions include:

- Underwood, J. K. (2019).UNDER THE LAW: Segregation and secession. Phi Delta Kappan.
- Underwood, J. K. (2018). UNDER THE LAW: Every vote counts -- and one vote can make an historic difference. Phi Delta Kappan.
- Underwood, J. K. (2018). UNDER THE LAW: Looking back on the 2017-18 Supreme Court term. Phi Delta Kappan.
- Underwood, J. K. (2018).UNDER THE LAW: School uniforms, dress codes, and free expression: What's the balance? Phi Delta Kappan.
- Underwood, J. K. (2017). Under the Law: Kneeling during the national anthem: At schools, it’s protected speech. Phi Delta Kappan.
- Underwood, J. K. (2017). Under the Law: Mixing guns and schools. Phi Delta Kappan.
- Underwood, J. K. (2017). Under the Law: The privacy of a student’s backpack. Phi Delta Kappan.
- Underwood, J. K. (2016). Under the Law: Expanded Support for Homeless Students. Phi Delta Kappan.
- Underwood, J. K. (May 2016). "Under the Law: Modern student speech and t-shirt jurisprudence". Phi Delta Kappan. 97 (8). Archived from the original on 2017-10-11 – via Questia.
- Underwood, J. K. (2016). Under the Law: Student online speech rights on and off campus. Phi Delta Kappan.
- Mead, Julie F., & Underwood, J. (2012, March). A smart ALEC threatens public education. Phi Delta Kappan, 93(6), pages 51–55.
- Underwood, J. K. (2011). ALEC Exposed: Starving Public Schools. The Nation.

== Media mentions ==
- National News Mentions
  - Video
    - https://www.npr.org/sections/ed/2017/07/20/537958123/betsy-devos-latest-speech-draws-protests-even-before-she-speaks
    - https://www.pbs.org/newshour/show/school-concerns-spur-passions-in-wisconsin-governors-race
  - Written
    - https://aacte.org/7-jte-faqs/27-how-do-i-advertise-in-jte.html
- Local News Mentions
  - Video
    - Wisconsin Public Television
      - https://video.wpt.org/video/university-place-wisconsins-education-challenges-ep-568/ (2011)
      - Here and Now Appearances (2019)
        - https://www.youtube.com/watch?v=KM1LQZyzxx0
        - https://www.facebook.com/WisconsinPublicTelevision/videos/noon-wednesday-with-guest-julie-underwood/1159265300919815/
    - https://wiseye.org/2013/04/15/newsmakers-changes-to-vouchers-charter-schools/
    - https://wiseye.org/2011/10/22/alecs-impact-on-legislation-part-2-of-4/
    - https://wiseye.org/2009/11/17/wiscape-wi-idea-forum-innovative-ideas-for-need-based-financial-aid-in-wisconsin-part-2-of-3/
    - Wisconsin Science Festival Testimonial, https://www.youtube.com/watch?v=YEr8MG7zGfY
    - Art, Sciences, Action, https://www.youtube.com/watch?v=YEr8MG7zGfY
    - School of Education TV (UW Madison) Interview with Julie Underwood, https://www.youtube.com/watch?v=YEr8MG7zGfY
  - Audio
    - https://wiseye.org/podcast/newsmakers-changes-to-vouchers-charter-schools/
  - Written
    - https://www.supportuw.org/stories/feature/dr-julie-underwood-former-dean-of-school-of-education-makes-estate-gift/
    - https://www.uwhealth.org/transplant/2018-transplant-and-organ-donation-calendar-bill-mckenzie-and-julie-underwood/51491
    - https://www.depauw.edu/news-media/latest-news/category/76/details/29567/
    - https://madison.com/ct/news/local/writers/pat_schneider/uw-madison-s-julie-underwood-says-controversial-teacher-education-rankings/article_1ac1fcba-f7ee-11e3-ac1f-001a4bcf887a.html
- Press Conferences
  - https://wiseye.org/2018/06/04/news-conference-wisconsin-public-education-network-partners-call-for-action/
- Serving on Panels
  - Panel at Wisconsin Public Education Network Annual Summer Summit (2018) with Wisconsin State Rep. Joel Kitchens, moderated by Dr. Julie Mead
    - https://wiseye.org/2018/08/01/-public-education-network-4th-annual-summit-part-1-4/
  - Debate on School Choice in Wisconsin- Dr. Julie Underwood v. Scott Jensen of the American Federation of Children, moderated by Alan Borsuk (2016)
  - Video of Panel- https://wiseye.org/2016/11/30/lessons-from-a-quarter-century-of-school-vouchers-one-conversation-two-points-of-view/
    - News Coverage of the Panel
      - https://www.wuwm.com/post/milwaukee-educators-debate-vouchers-school-choice-reappears-national-stage#stream/0
      - https://www.jsonline.com/story/news/education/2016/11/30/94629846/
      - https://law.marquette.edu/facultyblog/2016/12/01/two-views-one-conversation-light-shed-on-school-vouchers-at-law-school-program/
      - https://www.marquette.edu/news-center/2016/jensen-underwood-to-discuss-school-vouchers-in-conversation-at-marquette-law-school.php
      - https://www.wiscnews.com/youtube_6cbd6735-5c65-5ee3-850a-7bbc1c8bbcd2.html
- Serving on the Blue Ribbon Commission- Footage courtesy of Wisconsin Eye
  - https://wiseye.org/2018/06/04/blue-ribbon-commission-on-school-funding-public-hearing-4/
  - https://wiseye.org/2018/06/04/news-conference-wisconsin-public-education-network-partners-call-for-action/
  - https://wiseye.org/2018/05/21/blue-ribbon-commission-on-school-funding-public-hearing-3/
  - https://wiseye.org/2018/05/07/blue-ribbon-commission-on-school-funding-public-hearing-2/
  - https://wiseye.org/2018/04/23/blue-ribbon-commission-on-school-funding-public-hearing/
  - https://wiseye.org/2018/04/09/blue-ribbon-commission-public-hearing/
  - https://wiseye.org/2018/03/26/blue-ribbon-commission-on-school-funding/
  - https://wiseye.org/2018/02/02/blue-ribbon-commission-on-school-funding-part-1-2/
  - https://wiseye.org/2018/02/02/blue-ribbon-commission-on-school-funding-part-2-2/
  - https://wiseye.org/2017/12/14/blue-ribbon-commission-on-school-funding-part-1/
  - https://wiseye.org/2017/12/14/blue-ribbon-commission-on-school-funding-part-2/
  - https://wiseye.org/2018/12/19/blue-ribbon-commission-on-school-funding-informational-hearing/
