= Teacher =

Person who helps others learn

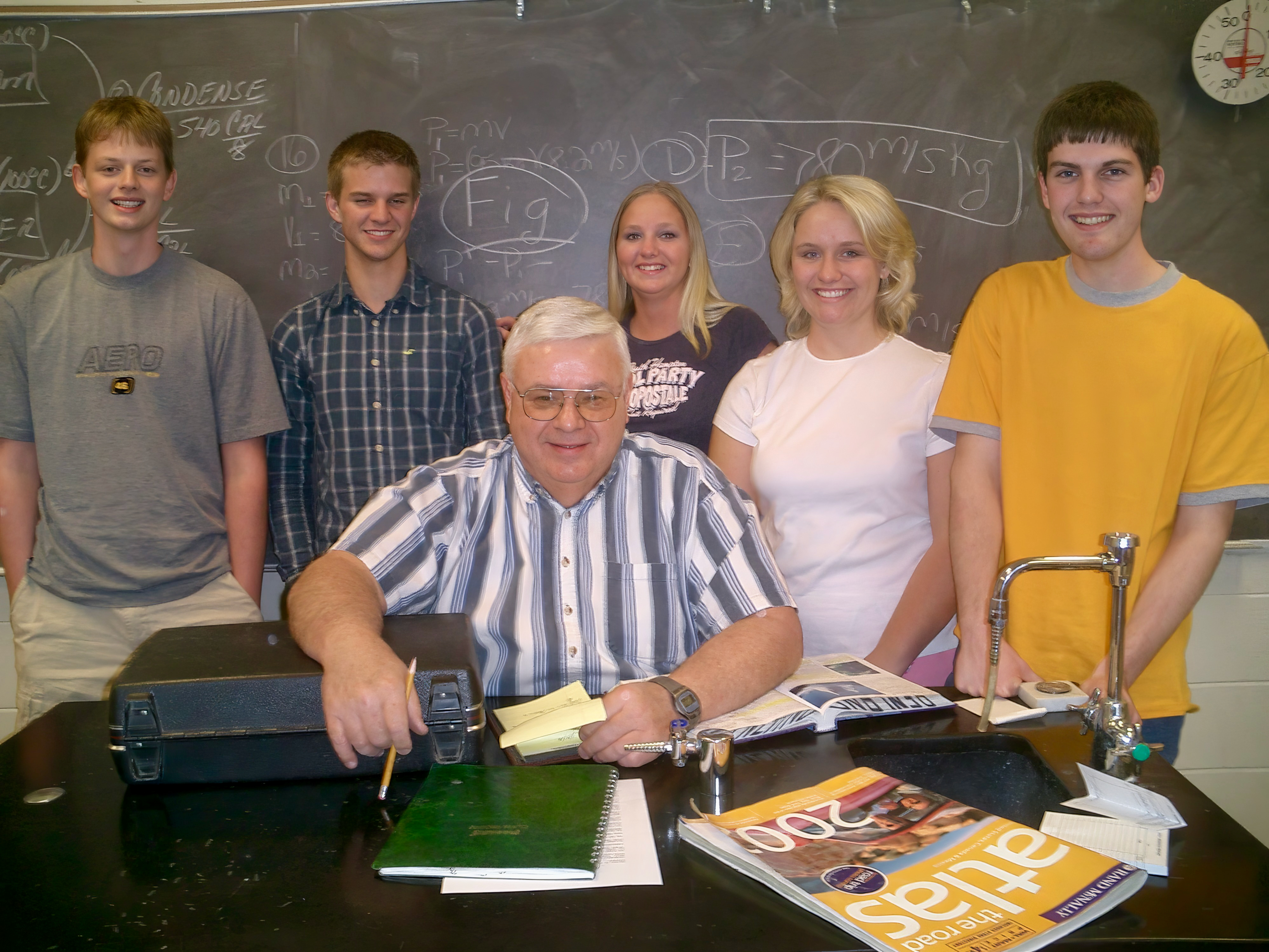
- A teacher surrounded by students in a classroom at a public high school in North Carolina

Occupation
- Names: Teacher, educator, schoolteacher
- Occupation type: Profession
- Activity sectors: Education

Description
- Competencies: Pedagogy, subject knowledge; competence in teaching the subject, in curriculum, in learner assessment; psychology; planning; leadership.
- Education required: (varies by country) Teaching certification
- Fields of employment: Schools
- Related jobs: Professor, academic, lecturer, tutor

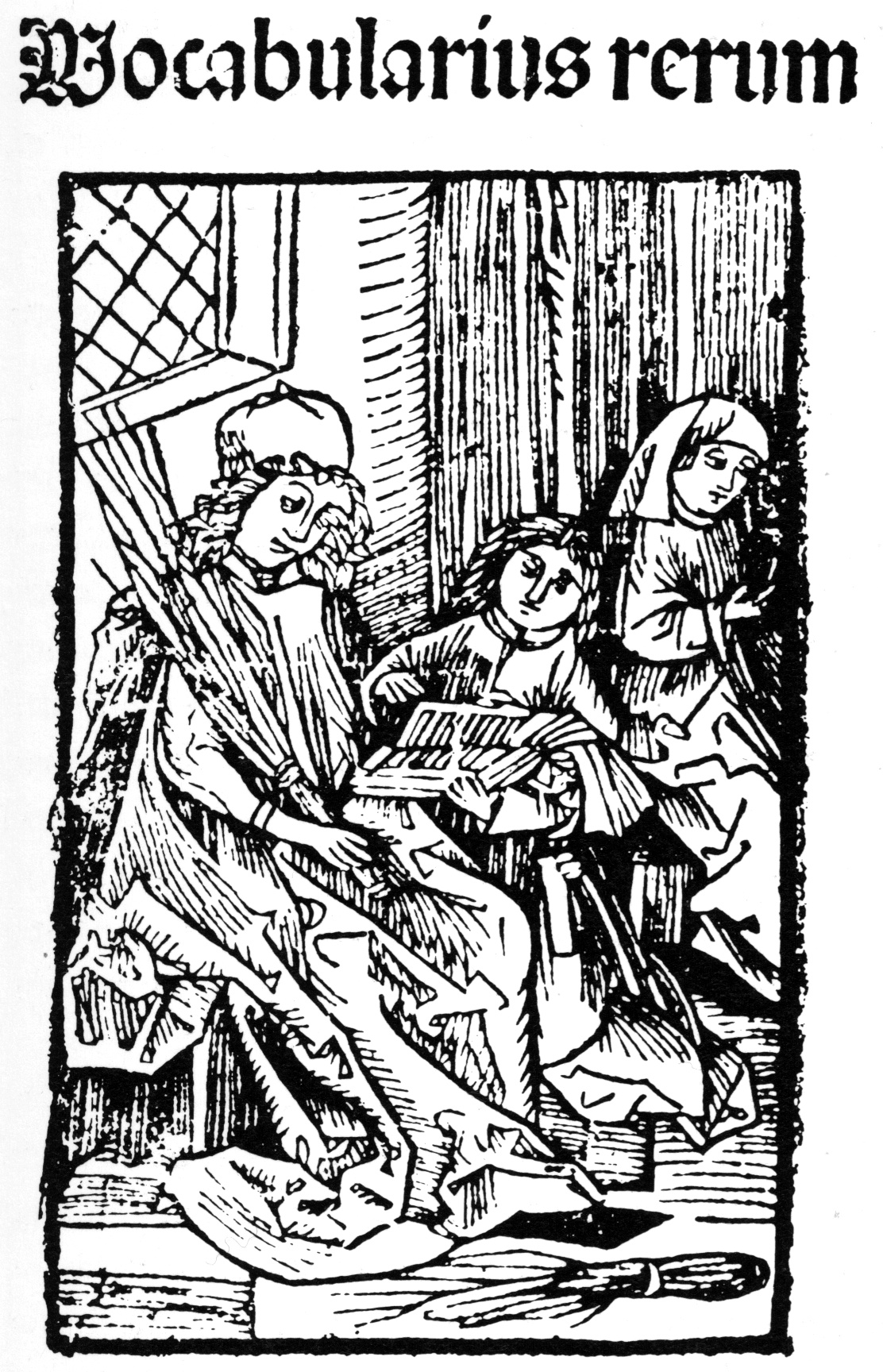
A teacher of a Latin school and two students, 1487

A teacher, also called a schoolteacher or formally an educator, is a person who helps students to acquire knowledge, competence, or virtue, via the practice of teaching.

Informally the role of teacher may be taken on by anyone (e.g. when showing a colleague how to perform a specific task). In some countries, teaching young people of school age may be carried out in an informal setting, such as within the family (homeschooling), rather than in a formal setting such as a school or college. Some other professions may involve a significant amount of teaching (e.g. youth worker, pastor).

In most countries, formal teaching of students is usually carried out by paid professional teachers. This article focuses on those who are employed, as their main role, to teach others in a formal education context, such as at a school or other place of initial formal education or training.

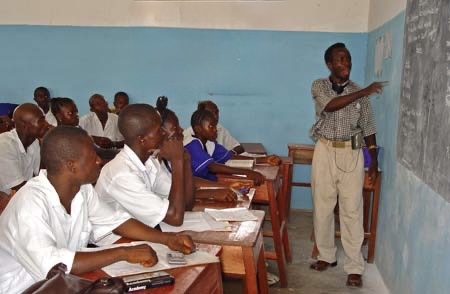
A teacher in a classroom at a secondary school in Pendembu, Sierra Leone

== Duties and functions ==
A teacher's role may vary among cultures.

Teachers may provide instruction in literacy and numeracy, craftsmanship or vocational training, the arts, religion, civics, community roles, or life skills.

Formal teaching tasks include preparing lessons according to agreed curricula, giving lessons, and assessing pupil progress.

A teacher's professional duties may extend beyond formal teaching. Outside of the classroom teachers may accompany students on field trips, supervise study halls, help with the organization of school functions, and serve as supervisors for extracurricular activities. They also have the legal duty to protect students from harm, such as that which may result from bullying, sexual harassment, racism or abuse. In some education systems, teachers may be responsible for student discipline.

== Competences and qualities required by teachers ==
Teaching is a highly complex activity. This is partially because teaching is a social practice, that takes place in a specific context (time, place, culture, socioeconomic situation etc.) and therefore is shaped by the values of that specific context. Factors that influence what is expected (or required) of teachers include history and tradition, social views about the purpose of education, accepted theories about learning, etc.

=== Competences ===
The competences required by a teacher are affected by the different ways in which the role is understood around the world. Broadly, there seem to be four models:

the teacher as manager of instruction;
the teacher as caring person;
the teacher as expert learner; and
the teacher as cultural and civic person.

The Organisation for Economic Co-operation and Development has argued that it is necessary to develop a shared definition of the skills and knowledge required by teachers, in order to guide teachers' career-long education and professional development. Some evidence-based international discussions have tried to reach such a common understanding. For example, the European Union has identified three broad areas of competences that teachers require:

Working with others
Working with knowledge, technology, and information, and
Working in and with society.

Scholarly consensus is emerging that what is required of teachers can be grouped under three headings:

knowledge (such as: the subject matter itself and knowledge about how to teach it, curricular knowledge, knowledge about the educational sciences, psychology, assessment etc.)
craft skills (such as lesson planning, using teaching technologies, managing students and groups, monitoring and assessing learning etc.) and
dispositions (such as essential values and attitudes, beliefs and commitment).

=== Qualities ===
==== Enthusiasm ====
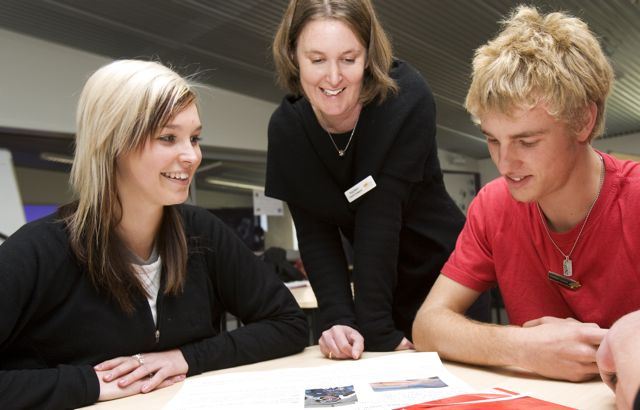
A teacher interacts with older students at a school in New Zealand.

It has been found that teachers who showed enthusiasm towards the course materials and students can create a positive learning experience. These teachers do not teach by rote but attempt to invigorate their teaching of the course materials every day. Teachers who cover the same curriculum repeatedly may find it challenging to maintain their enthusiasm, lest their boredom with the content bore their students in turn. Enthusiastic teachers are rated higher by their students than teachers who did not show much enthusiasm for the course materials.

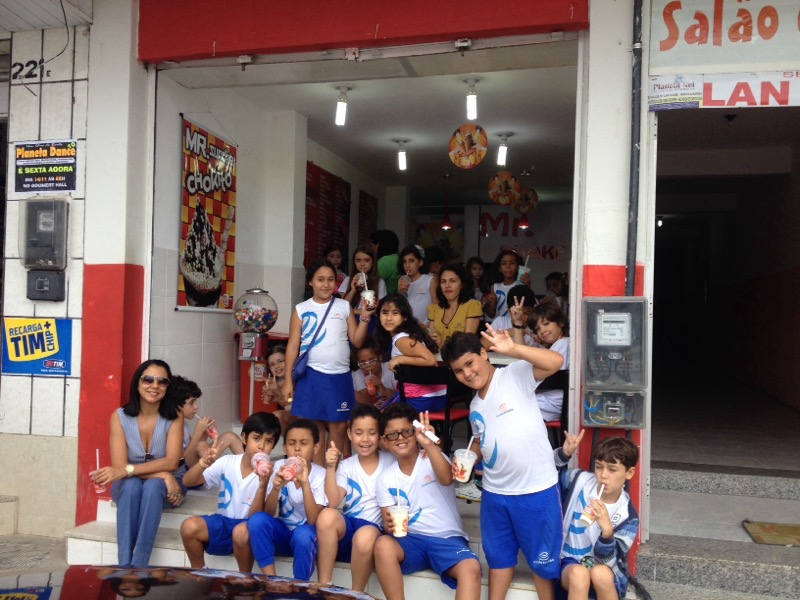
A primary school teacher on a picnic with her students, Colombia, 2014

Teachers that exhibit enthusiasm are more likely to have engaged, interested and energetic students who are curious about learning the subject matter. Recent research has found a correlation between teacher enthusiasm and students' intrinsic motivation to learn and vitality in the classroom. Controlled, experimental studies exploring intrinsic motivation of college students has shown that nonverbal expressions of enthusiasm, such as demonstrative gesturing, dramatic movements which are varied, and emotional facial expressions, result in college students reporting higher levels of intrinsic motivation to learn. But even while a teacher's enthusiasm has been shown to improve motivation and increase task engagement, it does not necessarily improve learning outcomes or memory for the material.

There are various mechanisms by which teacher enthusiasm may facilitate higher levels of intrinsic motivation. Teacher enthusiasm may contribute to a classroom atmosphere of energy and enthusiasm which feeds student interest and excitement in learning the subject matter. Enthusiastic teachers may also lead to students becoming more self-determined in their own learning process. The concept of mere exposure indicates that the teacher's enthusiasm may contribute to the student's expectations about intrinsic motivation in the context of learning. Also, enthusiasm may act as a "motivational embellishment", increasing a student's interest by the variety, novelty, and surprise of the enthusiastic teacher's presentation of the material. Finally, the concept of emotional contagion may also apply: students may become more intrinsically motivated by catching onto the enthusiasm and energy of the teacher.

==== Interaction with learners ====
Research shows that student motivation and attitudes towards school are closely linked to student-teacher relationships. Enthusiastic teachers are particularly good at creating beneficial relations with their students. Their ability to create effective learning environments that foster student achievement depends on the kind of relationship they build with their students. Useful teacher-to-student interactions are crucial in linking academic success with personal achievement. Here, personal success is a student's internal goal of improving themselves, whereas academic success includes the goals they receive from their superior. A teacher must guide their student in aligning their personal goals with their academic goals. Students who receive this positive influence show stronger self-confidence and greater personal and academic success than those without these teacher interactions.

Students are likely to build stronger relations with teachers who are friendly and supportive and will show more interest in courses taught by these teachers. Teachers that spend more time interacting and working directly with students are perceived as supportive and effective teachers. Effective teachers have been shown to invite student participation and decision making, allow humor into their classroom, and demonstrate a willingness to play.

==== Neutrality ====
Teachers are generally expected to teach controversial issues with a neutral or impartial pedagogical approach. Bias by teachers can result in an hidden curriculum. Discrimination by teachers can contribute to sex differences in education. In some countries teachers show a political bias in political party preference compared to the voters.

== Teaching qualifications ==
In many countries, a person who wishes to become a teacher must first obtain specified professional qualifications or credentials from a university or college. These professional qualifications may include the study of pedagogy, the science of teaching. Teachers, like other professionals, may have to, or choose to, continue their education after they qualify, a process known as continuing professional development.

The issue of teacher qualifications is linked to the status of the profession. In some societies, teachers enjoy a status on a par with physicians, lawyers, engineers, and accountants, in others, the status of the profession is low. In the twentieth century, many intelligent women were unable to get jobs in corporations or governments so many chose teaching as a default profession. As women become more welcomed into corporations and governments today, it may be more difficult to attract qualified teachers in the future.

Teachers are often required to undergo a course of initial education at a College of Education to ensure that they possess the necessary knowledge, competences and adhere to relevant codes of ethics.

There are a variety of bodies designed to instill, preserve and update the knowledge and professional standing of teachers. Around the world many teachers' colleges exist; they may be controlled by government or by the teaching profession itself.

They are generally established to serve and protect the public interest through certifying, governing, quality controlling, and enforcing standards of practice for the teaching profession.

=== Professional standards ===
The functions of the teachers' colleges may include setting out clear standards of practice, providing for the ongoing education of teachers, investigating complaints involving members, conducting hearings into allegations of professional misconduct and taking appropriate disciplinary action and accrediting teacher education programs. In many situations teachers in publicly funded schools must be members in good standing with the college, and private schools may also require their teachers to be college members. In other areas these roles may belong to the State Board of Education, the Superintendent of Public Instruction, the State Education Agency or other governmental bodies. In still other areas Teaching Unions may be responsible for some or all of these duties.

== Professional misconduct ==
Misconduct by teachers, especially sexual misconduct, has been getting increased scrutiny from the media and the courts. A study by the American Association of University Women reported that 9.6% of students in the United States claim to have received unwanted sexual attention from an adult associated with education; be they a volunteer, bus driver, teacher, administrator or other adult; sometime during their educational career.

A study in England showed a 0.3% prevalence of sexual abuse by any professional, a group that included priests, religious leaders, and case workers as well as teachers. This British study is the only one of its kind and consisted of "a random ... probability sample of 2,869 young people between the ages of 18 and 24 in a computer-assisted study" and that the questions referred to "sexual abuse with a professional," not necessarily a teacher. It is therefore logical to conclude that information on the percentage of abuses by teachers in the United Kingdom is not explicitly available and therefore not necessarily reliable. The AAUW study, however, posed questions about fourteen types of sexual harassment and various degrees of frequency and included only abuses by teachers. "The sample was drawn from a list of 80,000 schools to create a stratified two-stage sample design of 2,065 8th to 11th grade students". Its reliability was gauged at 95% with a 4% margin of error.

In the United States especially, several high-profile cases such as Debra LaFave, Pamela Rogers Turner, and Mary Kay Letourneau have caused increased scrutiny on teacher misconduct.

Chris Keates, the general secretary of National Association of Schoolmasters Union of Women Teachers, said that teachers who have sex with pupils over the age of consent should not be placed on the sex offenders register and that prosecution for statutory rape "is a real anomaly in the law that we are concerned about." This has led to outrage from child protection and parental rights groups. Fears of being labelled a pedophile or hebephile has led to several men who enjoy teaching avoiding the profession. This has in some jurisdictions reportedly led to a shortage of male teachers.

== Pedagogy and teaching ==
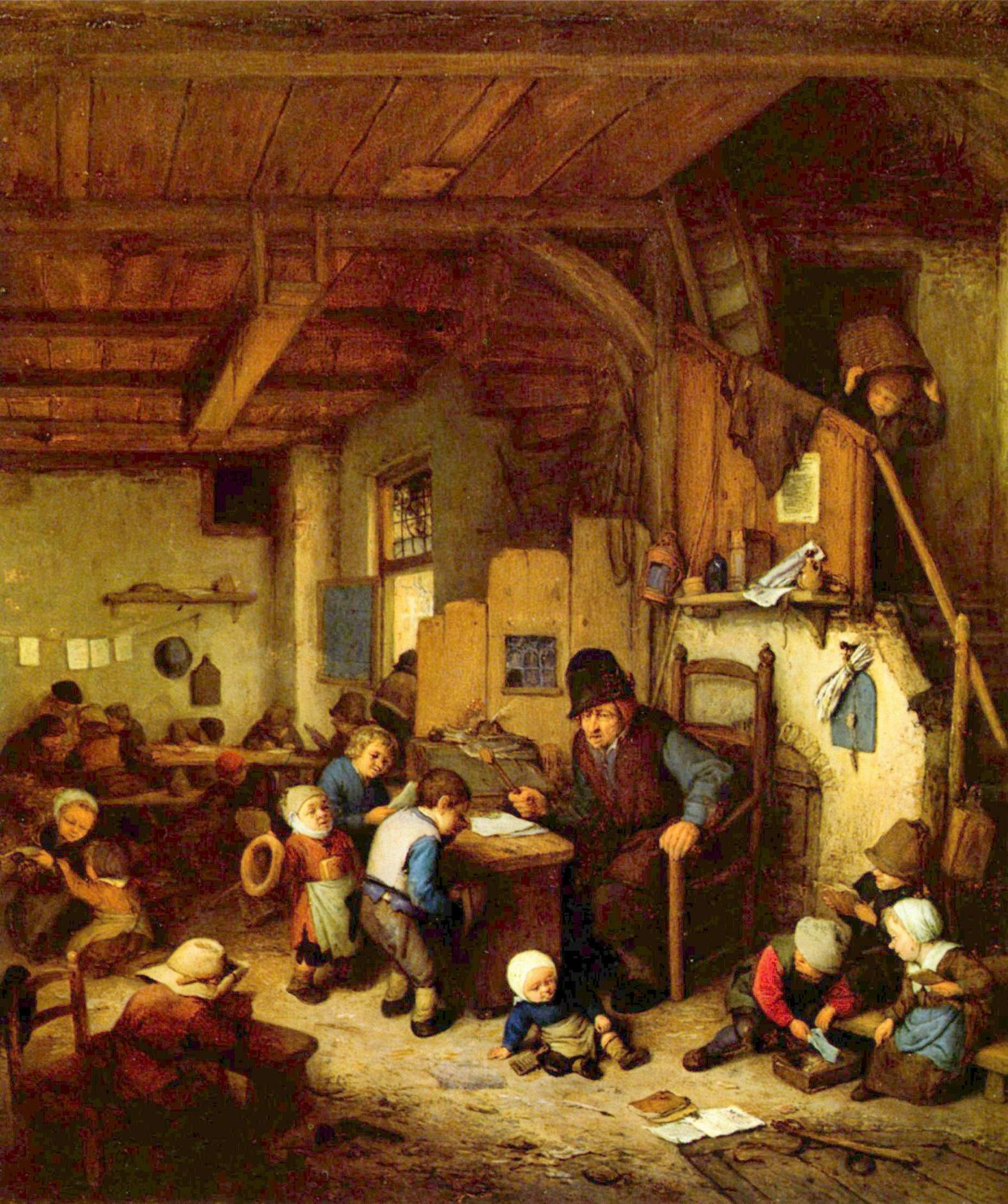
Dutch schoolmaster and children, 1662

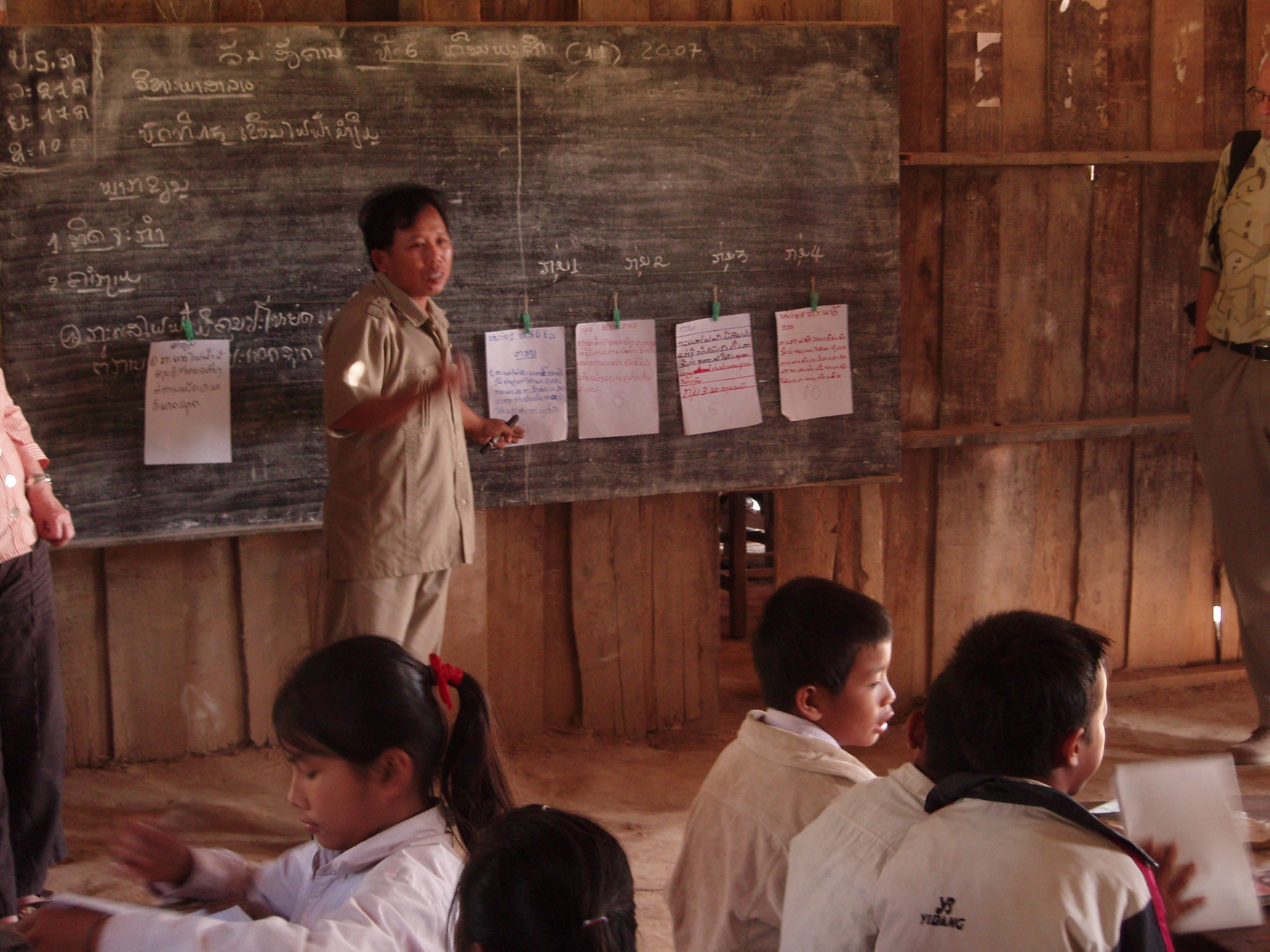
A primary school teacher in northern Laos

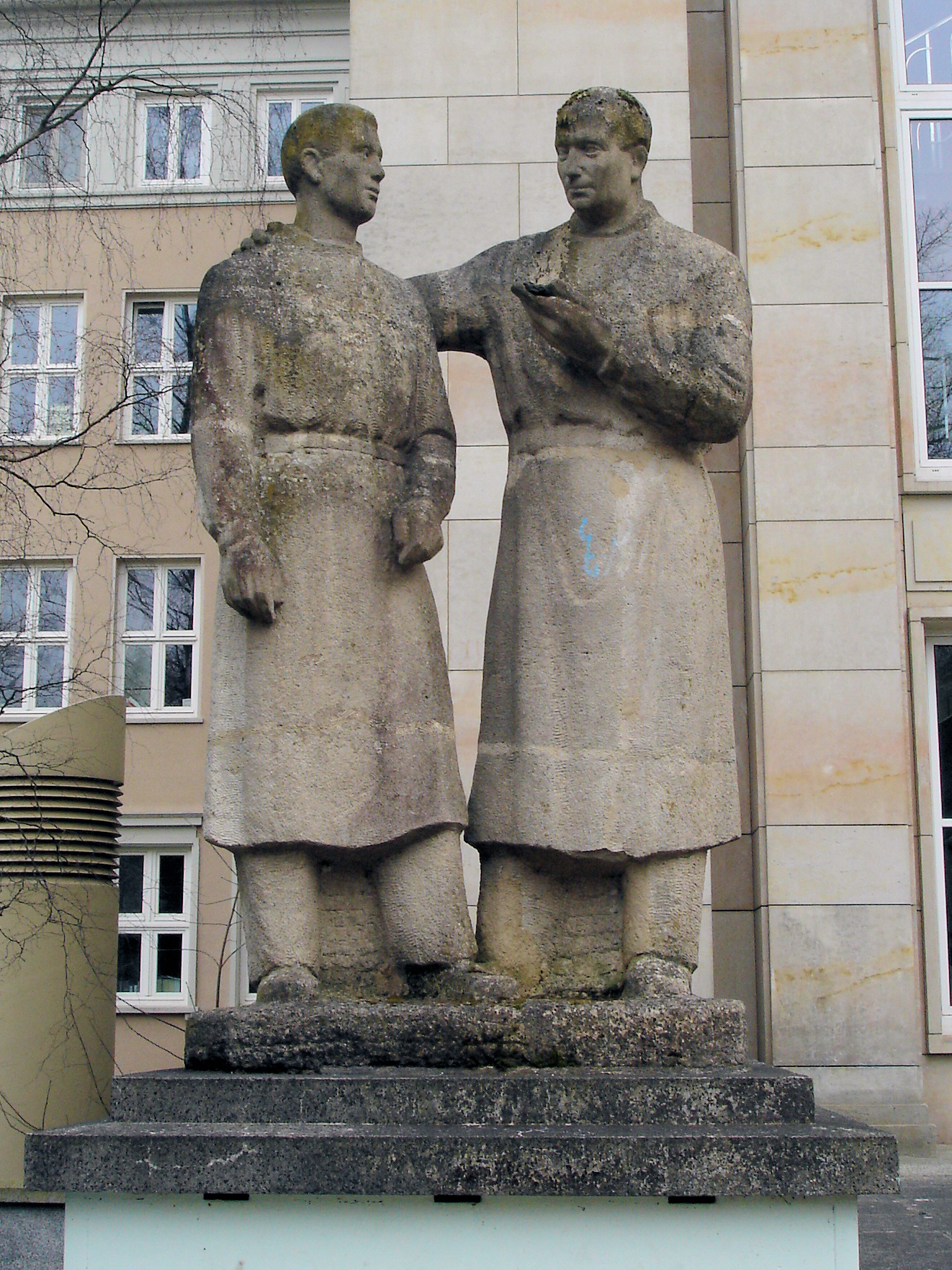
The teacher-student-monument in Rostock, Germany, honors teachers.

Teachers facilitate student learning, often in a school or academy or perhaps in another environment such as outdoors.

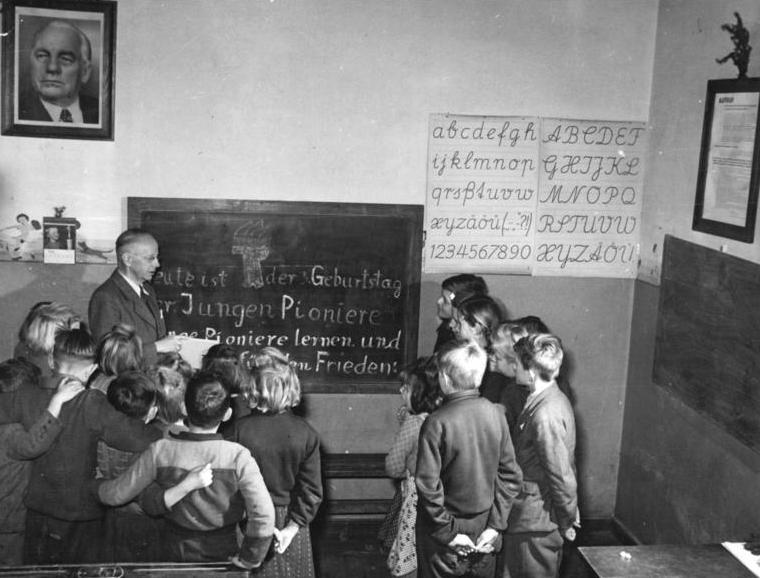
GDR "village teacher", a teacher teaching students of all age groups in one class in 1951

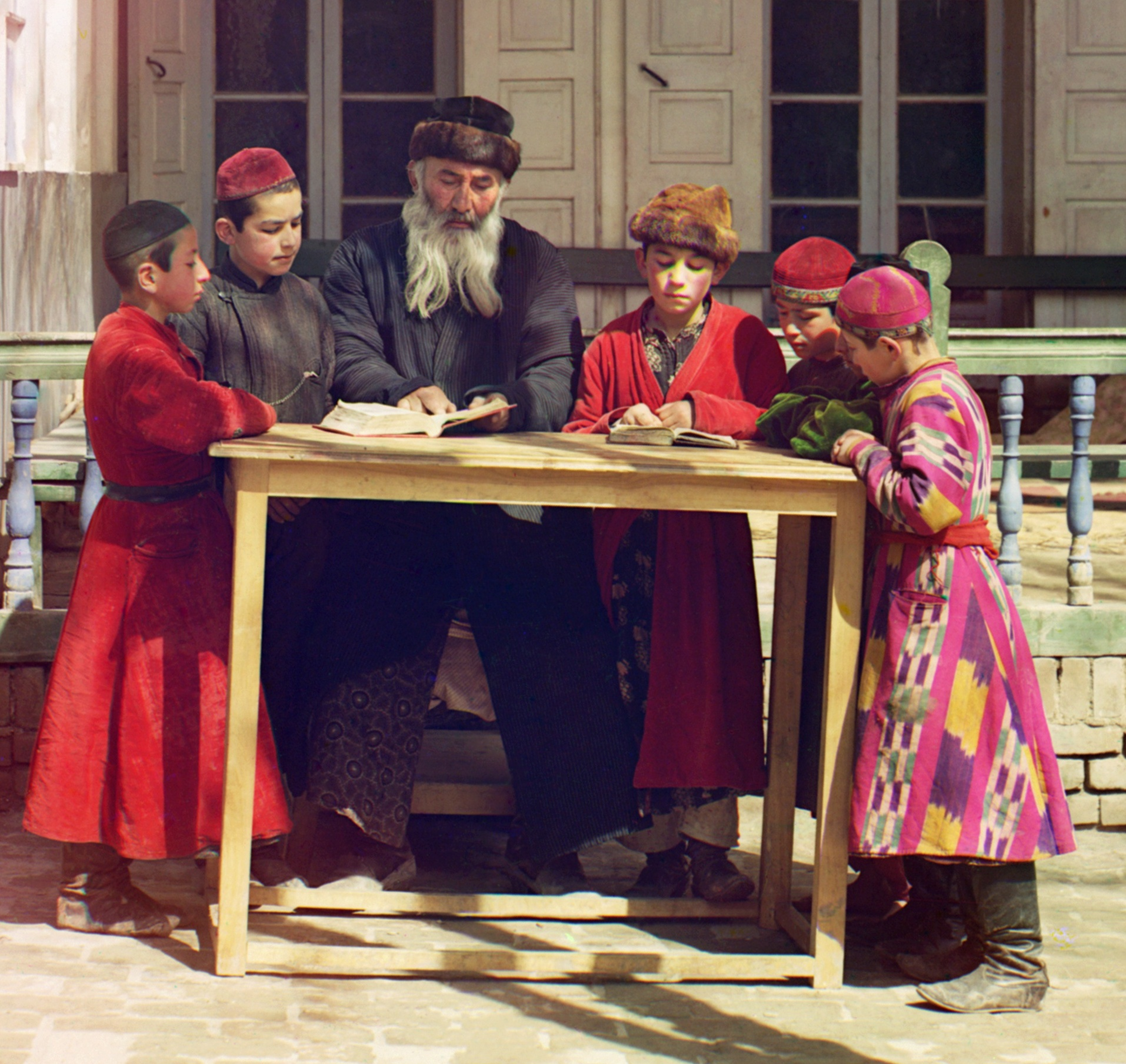
Jewish children with their teacher in Samarkand, the beginning of the 20th century

The objective is typically accomplished through either an informal or formal approach to learning, including a course of study and lesson plan that teaches skills, knowledge or thinking skills. Different ways to teach are often referred to as pedagogy. When deciding what teaching method to use teachers consider students' background knowledge, environment, and their learning goals as well as standardized curricula as determined by the relevant authority. Many times, teachers assist in learning outside of the classroom by accompanying students on field trips. The increasing use of technology, specifically the rise of the internet over the past decade, has begun to shape the way teachers approach their roles in the classroom.

The objective is typically a course of study, lesson plan, or a practical skill. A teacher may follow standardized curricula as determined by the relevant authority. The teacher may interact with students of different ages, from infants to adults, students with different abilities and students with learning disabilities.

Teaching using pedagogy also involve assessing the educational levels of the students on particular skills. Understanding the pedagogy of the students in a classroom involves using differentiated instruction as well as supervision to meet the needs of all students in the classroom. Pedagogy can be thought of in two manners. Teaching itself can be taught in many different ways, hence, using a pedagogy of teaching methods. For example, an experienced teacher and parent described the place of a teacher in learning as follows: "The real bulk of learning takes place in self-study and problem solving with a lot of feedback around that loop. The function of the teacher is to pressure the lazy, inspire the bored, deflate the cocky, encourage the timid, detect and correct individual flaws, and broaden the viewpoint of all. This function looks like that of a coach using the whole gamut of psychology to get each new class of rookies off the bench and into the game."

Perhaps the most significant difference between primary school and secondary school teaching is the relationship between teachers and children. In primary schools each class has a teacher who stays with them for most of the week and will teach them the whole curriculum. In secondary schools they will be taught by different subject specialists each session during the week and may have ten or more different teachers. The relationship between children and their teachers tends to be closer in the primary school where they act as form tutor, specialist teacher and surrogate parent during the course of the day.

This is true throughout most of the United States as well. However, alternative approaches for primary education do exist. One of these, sometimes referred to as a "platoon" system, involves placing a group of students together in one class that moves from one specialist to another for every subject. The advantage here is that students learn from teachers who specialize in one subject and who tend to be more knowledgeable in that one area than a teacher who teaches many subjects. Students still derive a strong sense of security by staying with the same group of peers for all classes.

Co-teaching has also become a new trend amongst educational institutions. Co-teaching is defined as two or more teachers working harmoniously to fulfill the needs of every student in the classroom. Co-teaching focuses the student on learning by providing a social networking support that allows them to reach their full cognitive potential. Co-teachers work in sync with one another to create a climate of learning.

=== Classroom management ===
==== Teachers and school discipline ====
Throughout the history of education the most common form of school discipline was corporal punishment. While a child was in school, a teacher was expected to act as a substitute parent, with all the normal forms of parental discipline open to them.

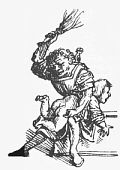
Medieval schoolboy birched on the bare buttocks

In past times, corporal punishment (spanking or paddling or caning or strapping or birching the student in order to cause physical pain) was one of the most common forms of school discipline throughout much of the world. Most Western countries, and some others, have now banned it, but it remains lawful in the United States following a US Supreme Court decision in 1977 which held that paddling did not violate the US Constitution.

30 US states have banned corporal punishment, the others (mostly in the South) have not. It is still used to a significant (though declining) degree in some public schools in Alabama, Arkansas, Georgia, Louisiana, Mississippi, Oklahoma, Tennessee and Texas. Private schools in these and most other states may also use it. Corporal punishment in American schools is administered to the seat of the student's trousers or skirt with a specially made wooden paddle. This often used to take place in the classroom or hallway, but nowadays the punishment is usually given privately in the principal's office.

Official corporal punishment, often by caning, remains commonplace in schools in some Asian, African and Caribbean countries.

Currently detention is one of the most common punishments in schools in the United States, the UK, Ireland, Singapore and other countries. It requires the pupil to remain in school at a given time in the school day (such as lunch, recess or after school); or even to attend school on a non-school day, e.g. "Saturday detention" held at some schools. During detention, students normally have to sit in a classroom and do work, write lines or a punishment essay, or sit quietly.

A modern example of school discipline in North America and Western Europe relies upon the idea of an assertive teacher who is prepared to impose their will upon a class. Positive reinforcement is balanced with immediate and fair punishment for misbehavior and firm, clear boundaries define what is appropriate and inappropriate behavior. Teachers are expected to respect their students; sarcasm and attempts to humiliate pupils are seen as falling outside of what constitutes reasonable discipline.

Whilst this is the consensus viewpoint amongst the majority of academics, some teachers and parents advocate a more assertive and confrontational style of discipline (refer to Canter Model of Discipline). Such individuals claim that many problems with modern schooling stem from the weakness in school discipline and if teachers exercised firm control over the classroom they would be able to teach more efficiently. This viewpoint is supported by the educational attainment of countries—in East Asia for instance—that combine strict discipline with high standards of education.

It's not clear, however that this stereotypical view reflects the reality of East Asian classrooms or that the educational goals in these countries are commensurable with those in Western countries. In Japan, for example, although average attainment on standardized tests may exceed those in Western countries, classroom discipline and behavior is highly problematic. Although, officially, schools have extremely rigid codes of behavior, in practice many teachers find the students unmanageable and do not enforce discipline at all.

Where school class sizes are typically 40 to 50 students, maintaining order in the classroom can divert the teacher from instruction, leaving little opportunity for concentration and focus on what is being taught. In response, teachers may concentrate their attention on motivated students, ignoring attention-seeking and disruptive students. The result of this is that motivated students, facing demanding university entrance examinations, receive disproportionate resources. Given the emphasis on attainment of university places, administrators and governors may regard this policy as appropriate.

==== Obligation to honor students' rights ====
Sudbury-model democratic schools claim that popularly based authority can maintain order more effectively than dictatorial authority for governments and schools alike. They also claim that in these schools the preservation of public order is easier and more efficient than anywhere else. Primarily because rules and regulations are made by the community as a whole, thence the school atmosphere is one of persuasion and negotiation, rather than confrontation since there is no one to confront. Sudbury model democratic schools' proponents argue that a school that has good, clear laws, fairly and democratically passed by the entire school community, and a good judicial system for enforcing these laws, is a school in which community discipline prevails, and in which an increasingly sophisticated concept of law and order develops, against other schools today, where rules are arbitrary, authority is absolute, punishment is capricious, and due process of law is unknown.

== Occupational hazards ==
Teachers face several occupational hazards in their line of work, including occupational stress, which can negatively impact teachers' mental and physical health, productivity, and students' performance. Stress can be caused by organizational change, relationships with students, fellow teachers, and administrative personnel, working environment, expectations to substitute, long hours with a heavy workload, and inspections. Teachers are also at high risk for occupational burnout.

A 2000 study found that 42% of UK teachers experienced occupational stress, twice the figure for the average profession. A 2012 study found that teachers experienced double the rate of anxiety, depression, and stress than average workers.

There are several ways to mitigate the occupational hazards of teaching. Organizational interventions, like changing teachers' schedules, providing support networks and mentoring, changing the work environment, and offering promotions and bonuses, may be effective in helping to reduce occupational stress among teachers. Individual-level interventions, including stress-management training and counseling, are also used to relieve occupational stress among teachers.

Apart from this, teachers are often not given sufficient opportunities for professional growth or promotions. This leads to some stagnancy, as there is not sufficient interests to enter the profession. An organisation in India called Center for Teacher Accreditation (CENTA) is working to reduce this hazard, by trying to open opportunities for teachers in India.

== Teaching around the world ==
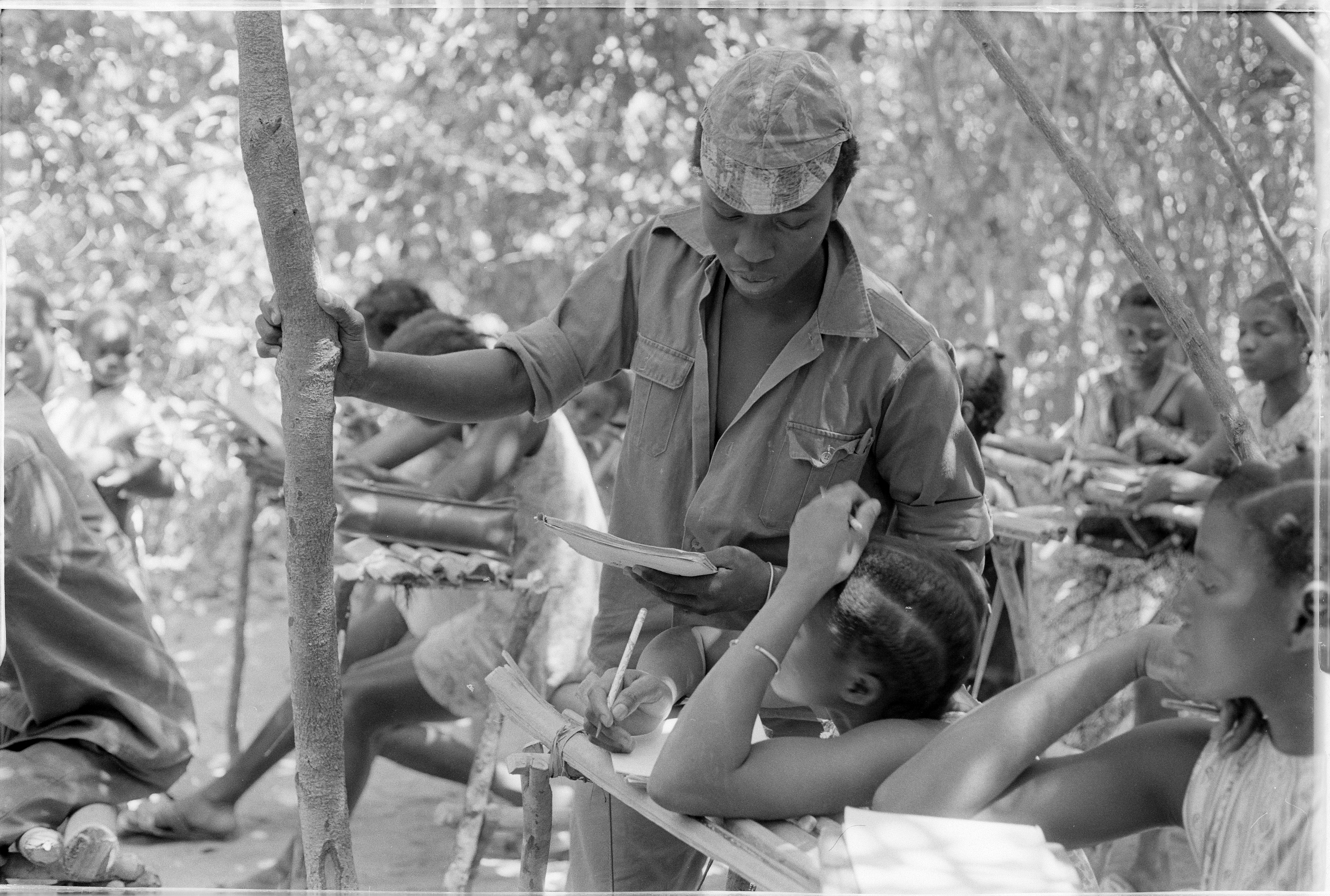
Teacher and pupils in liberated Guinea-Bissau, 1974

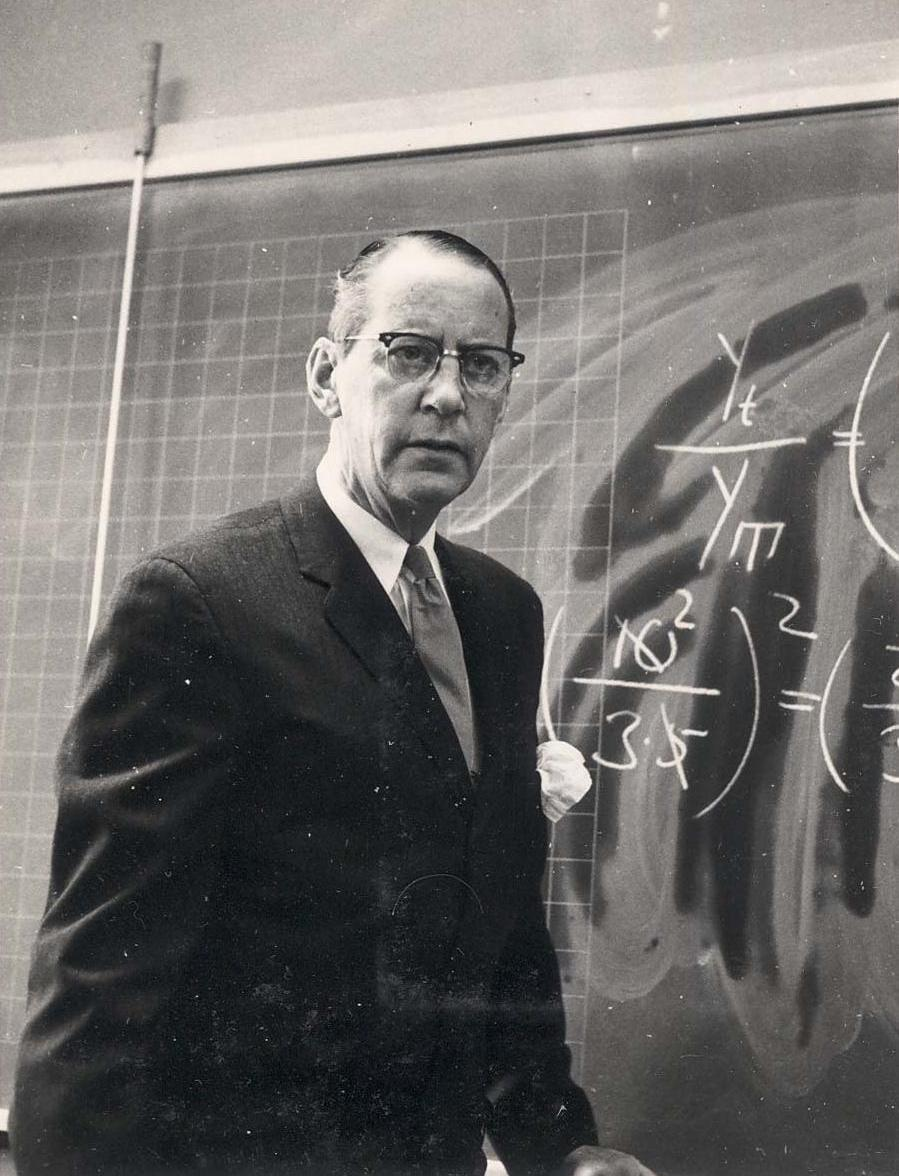
Math and physics teacher at a junior college in Sweden, in the 1960s

There are many similarities and differences among teachers around the world. In almost all countries teachers are educated in a university or college. Governments may require certification by a recognized body before they can teach in a school. In many countries, elementary school education certificate is earned after completion of high school. The high school student follows an education specialty track, obtain the prerequisite "student-teaching" time, and receive a special diploma to begin teaching after graduation. In addition to certification, many educational institutions especially within the US, require that prospective teachers pass a background check and psychiatric evaluation to be able to teach in classroom. This is not always the case with adult further learning institutions but is fast becoming the norm in many countries as security concerns grow.

In most countries women are overrepresented among teachers at primary schools and secondary schools. International schools generally follow an English-speaking, Western curriculum and are aimed at expatriate communities.

=== Australia ===
Education in Australia is primarily the responsibility of the individual states and territories. Generally, education in Australia follows the three-tier model which includes primary education (primary schools), followed by secondary education (secondary schools/high schools) and tertiary education (universities or TAFE colleges).

=== Canada ===
Teaching in Canada requires a post-secondary degree Bachelor's Degree. In most provinces a second Bachelor's Degree such as a Bachelor of Education is required to become a qualified teacher. Salary ranges from $40,000/year to $90,000/yr. Teachers have the option to teach for a public school which is funded by the provincial government or teaching in a private school which is funded by the private sector, businesses and sponsors.

=== France ===
In France, teachers, or professors, are mainly civil servants, recruited by competitive examination.

=== Germany ===
In Germany, teachers are mainly civil servants recruited in special university classes, called Lehramtstudien (Teaching Education Studies). There are many differences between the teachers for elementary schools (Grundschule), lower secondary schools (Hauptschule), middle level secondary schools (Realschule) and higher level secondary schools (Gymnasium). Salaries for teachers depend on the civil servants' salary index scale (Bundesbesoldungsordnung).

=== India ===
In ancient India, the most common form of education was gurukula based on the guru-shishya tradition (teacher-disciple tradition) which involved the disciple and guru living in the same (or a nearby) residence. These gurukulam was supported by public donations and the guru would not accept any fees from the shishya. This organized system stayed the most prominent form of education in the Indian subcontinent until the British invasion. Through strong efforts in 1886 and 1948, the gurukula system was revived in India.

The role and success of a teacher in the modern Indian education system is clearly defined. CENTA Standards define the competencies that a good teacher should possess. Schools look for competent teachers across grades. Teachers are appointed directly by schools in private sector, and through eligibility tests in government schools.

=== Ireland ===
Salaries for primary teachers in Ireland depend mainly on seniority (i.e. holding the position of principal, deputy principal or assistant principal), experience and qualifications. Extra pay is also given for teaching through the Irish language, in a Gaeltacht area or on an island. The basic pay for a starting teacher is €27,814 p.a., rising incrementally to €53,423 for a teacher with 25 years service. A principal of a large school with many years experience and several qualifications (M.A., H.Dip., etc.) could earn over €90,000.

Teachers are required to be registered with the Teaching Council; under Section 30 of the Teaching Council Act 2001, a person employed in any capacity in a recognised teaching post - who is not registered with the Teaching Council - may not be paid from Oireachtas funds.

From 2006 Garda vetting has been introduced for new entrants to the teaching profession. These procedures apply to teaching and also to non-teaching posts and those who refuse vetting "cannot be appointed or engaged by the school in any capacity including in a voluntary role". Existing staff will be vetted on a phased basis.

=== Philippines ===
To become a teacher in the Philippines, one must have a bachelor's degree in education. Other degrees are also allowed as long they are able to get 18 units of professional education subjects (10 units for arts and sciences degrees). A board exam must be taken to become a professional teacher in the Philippines. Upon passing the board exam, the Professional Regulatory Commission will issue a teaching licence.

=== United Kingdom ===
Schoolmarm, a figurine by Royal Doulton

Education in the United Kingdom is a devolved matter with each of the countries of the United Kingdom having separate systems.

==== England ====
Salaries for nursery, primary and secondary school teachers ranged from £20,133 to £41,004 in September 2007, although some salaries can go much higher depending on experience and extra responsibilities. Preschool teachers may earn an average salary of £19,543 annually. Teachers in state schools must have at least a bachelor's degree, complete an approved teacher education program, and be licensed.

Many counties offer alternative licensing programs to attract people into teaching, especially for hard-to-fill positions. Excellent job opportunities are expected as retirements, especially among secondary school teachers, outweigh slowing enrollment growth; opportunities will vary by geographic area and subject taught.

==== Scotland ====
In Scotland, anyone wishing to teach must be registered with the General Teaching Council for Scotland (GTCS). Teaching in Scotland is an all graduate profession and the normal route for graduates wishing to teach is to complete a programme of Initial Teacher Education (ITE) at one of the seven Scottish Universities who offer these courses. Once successfully completed, "Provisional Registration" is given by the GTCS which is raised to "Full Registration" status after a year if there is sufficient evidence to show that the "Standard for Full Registration" has been met.

For the salary year beginning April 2008, unpromoted teachers in Scotland earned from £20,427 for a Probationer, up to £32,583 after 6 years teaching, but could then go on to earn up to £39,942 as they complete the modules to earn Chartered Teacher Status (requiring at least 6 years at up to two modules per year.) Promotion to Principal Teacher positions attracts a salary of between £34,566 and £44,616; Deputy Head, and Head teachers earn from £40,290 to £78,642. Teachers in Scotland can be registered members of trade unions with the main ones being the Educational Institute of Scotland and the Scottish Secondary Teachers' Association.

==== Wales ====
Education in Wales differs in certain respects from education elsewhere in the United Kingdom. For example, a significant number of students all over Wales are educated either wholly or largely through the medium of Welsh: in 2008/09, 22 per cent of classes in maintained primary schools used Welsh as the sole or main medium of instruction. Welsh medium education is available to all age groups through nurseries, schools, colleges and universities and in adult education; lessons in the language itself are compulsory for all pupils until the age of 16.

Teachers in Wales can be registered members of trade unions such as ATL, NUT or NASUWT and a report in 2010 suggested that the average age of teachers in Wales was falling with teachers being younger than in previous years. It was suggested that a proportion of older teachers had faced discrimination and did not have their experience valued. A growing cause of concern at that time was that attacks on teachers in Welsh schools reached an all-time high between 2005 and 2010.

=== United States ===
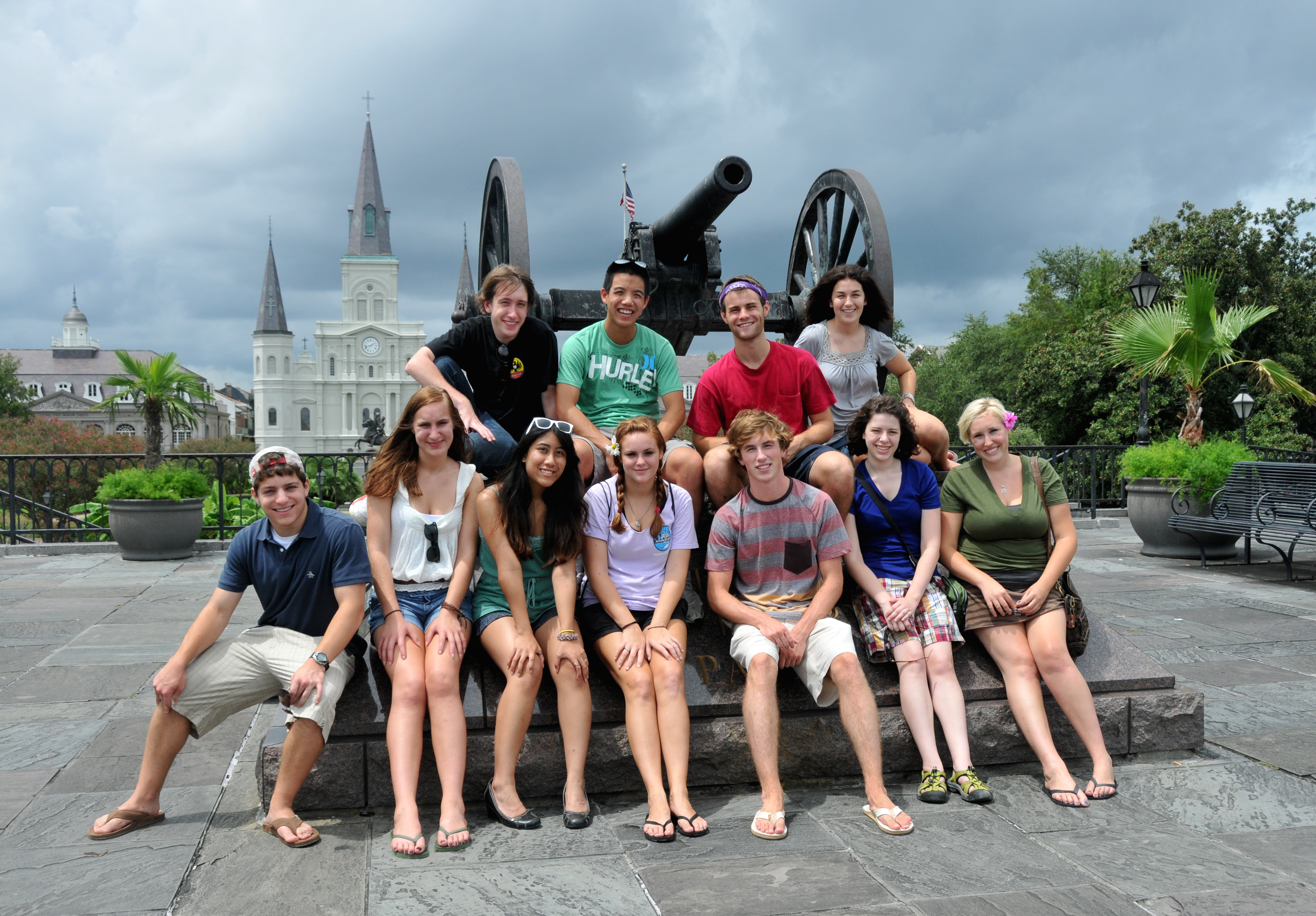
Students of a U.S. university with their professor on the far right, 2009

In the United States, each state determines the requirements for getting a license to teach in public schools. Teaching certification generally lasts three years, but teachers can receive certificates that last as long as ten years. Public school teachers are required to have a bachelor's degree and the majority must be certified by the state in which they teach. Many charter schools do not require that their teachers be certified, provided they meet the standards to be highly qualified as set by No Child Left Behind. Additionally, the requirements for substitute/temporary teachers are generally not as rigorous as those for full-time professionals. The Bureau of Labor Statistics estimates that there are 1.4 million elementary school teachers, 674,000 middle school teachers, and 1 million secondary school teachers employed in the U.S.

In the past, teachers have been paid relatively low salaries. However, average teacher salaries have improved rapidly in recent years. US teachers are generally paid on graduated scales, with income depending on experience. Teachers with more experience and higher education earn more than those with a standard bachelor's degree and certificate. Salaries vary greatly depending on state, relative cost of living, and grade taught. Salaries also vary within states where wealthy suburban school districts generally have higher salary schedules than other districts. The median salary for all primary and secondary teachers was $46,000 in 2004, with the average entry salary for a teacher with a bachelor's degree being an estimated $32,000. Median salaries for preschool teachers, however, were less than half the national median for secondary teachers, clock in at an estimated $21,000 in 2004. For high school teachers, median salaries in 2007 ranged from $35,000 in South Dakota to $71,000 in New York, with a national median of $52,000. Some contracts may include long-term disability insurance, life insurance, emergency/personal leave and investment options.

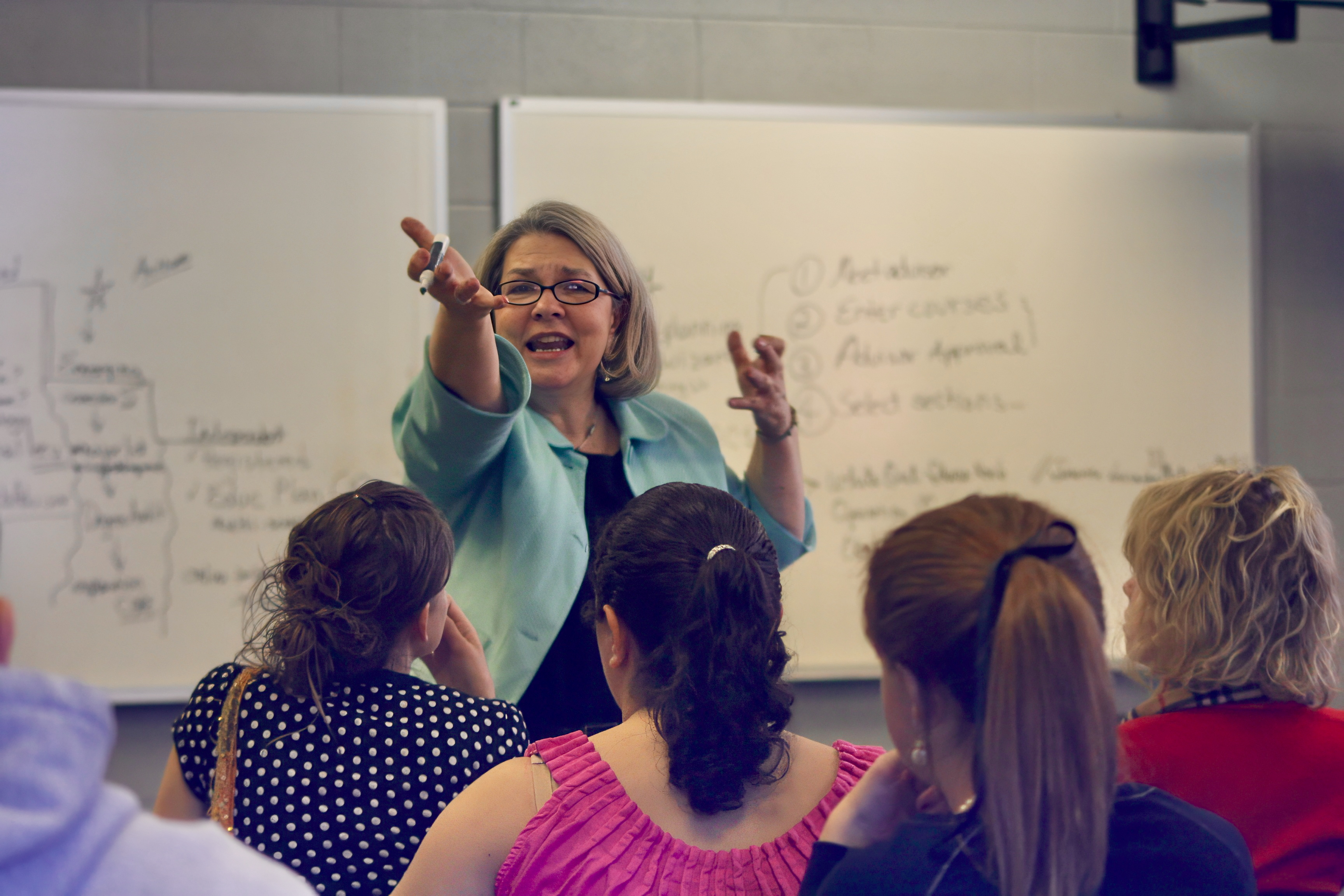
A teacher holds a class in Cleveland, Tennessee

The American Federation of Teachers' teacher salary survey for the 2006–07 school year found that the average teacher salary was $51,009. In a salary survey report for K-12 teachers, elementary school teachers had the lowest median salary earning $39,259. High school teachers had the highest median salary earning $41,855. Many teachers take advantage of the opportunity to increase their income by supervising after-school programs and other extracurricular activities. In addition to monetary compensation, public school teachers may also enjoy greater benefits (like health insurance) compared to other occupations. Merit pay systems are on the rise for teachers, paying teachers extra money based on excellent classroom evaluations, high test scores and for high success at their overall school. Also, with the advent of the internet, many teachers are now selling their lesson plans to other teachers through the web in order to earn supplemental income, most notably on TeachersPayTeachers.com. The United Nations Sustainable Development Goal 4 also aims to substantially increase the supply of qualified teachers through international cooperation by 2030 in an effort to improve the quality of teaching around the world.

According to a 2024 study, the status of being a teacher in the United States (as measured by occupational prestige, interest among students, the number of individuals preparing for entry, and on-the-job satisfaction) was at its lowest levels since the 1950s.

== Assistant teachers ==
Assistant teachers are additional teachers assisting the primary teacher, often in the same classroom. There are different types around the world, as well as a variety of formal programs defining roles and responsibilities.

One type is a Foreign Language Assistant, which in Germany is run by the Educational Exchange Service (Pädagogischer Austauschdienst).

British schools employ teaching assistants, who are not considered fully qualified teachers, and as such, are guided by teachers but may supervise and teach groups of pupils independently. In the United Kingdom, the term "assistant teacher" used to be used to refer to any qualified or unqualified teacher who was not a head or deputy head teacher.

The Japanese education system employs Assistant Language Teachers in elementary, junior high and high schools.

Learning by teaching (German short form: LdL) is a method which allows pupils and students to prepare and teach lessons or parts of lessons, with the understanding that a student's own learning is enhanced through the teaching process.

== See also ==
- Pedeutology
- AI teaching assistant
- Bullying in teaching
- Certified teacher
- School of education
- Student teacher
- Substitute teacher
- Teacher Support Network (in the UK)
- Education policy#Teacher policy
- Teacher education
  - Normal school, for training teachers before 1920
