= Certified teacher =

Teacher with authoritative credentials

Future teachers (on left) receive their education degrees in a graduation ceremony.

A certified teacher (also known as registered teacher, licensed teacher, accredited teacher, or professional teacher based on jurisdiction) is an educator who has earned credentials from an authoritative source, such as a government's regulatory authority, an education department/ministry, a higher education institution, or a private body. This teacher qualification gives a teacher authorization to teach and grade in pre-schools, primary or secondary education in countries, schools, content areas or curricula where authorization is required. While many authorizing entities require student teaching experience before earning teacher certification, routes vary from country to country.

A teaching qualification is one of a number of academic and professional degrees that enables a person to become a registered teacher. Examples of teaching qualifications in different jurisdictions include a Diploma in Education and Training, Bachelor of Education, Master of Education, Postgraduate Certificate in Education, Professional Graduate Diploma in Education (PGDE), and Professional Graduate Certificate in Teaching & Learning. These qualifications are still reviewed by the jurisdiction's regulatory authority and teachers may still be required to take a test to see if they know the right competencies in pedagogy and their subject specialisation. If they meet the necessary requirements and competencies, they are issued a certificate or licence to practise teaching. Though teacher certifications are most commonly provided by governments and higher education institutions, there are a few private bodies providing teacher certifications; for example, the National Board for Professional Teaching Standards in the United States and the Centre for Teacher Accreditation (CENTA) in India.

== Australia ==
Each state and territory in Australia maintains its own regulatory body for teachers:

- In the Australian Capital Territory, the Australian Capital Territory Teacher Quality Institute
- In the Northern Territory, the Teacher Registration Board of the Northern Territory (TRBNT)
- In New South Wales, the NSW Education Standards Authority (NESA)
- In Queensland, the Queensland College of Teachers (QCT)
- In South Australia, the Teachers Registration Board of South Australia (TRBSA)
- In Tasmania, the Teachers Registration Board of Tasmania (TRBTAS)
- In Victoria, the Victorian Institute of Teaching (VIT)
- In Western Australia, the Teacher Registration Board of Western Australia (TRBWA).

Each of these bodies is responsible for overseeing teacher registration in its respective jurisdiction. Registration in one Australian jurisdiction may be carried over to one of the others under the provisions of the Mutual Recognition Act, an act that was passed in 1992 by the federal Parliament and each of the Parliaments of the other jurisdictions. New Zealand teaching registration is also recognised in Australia, under the provisions of the Trans-Tasman Mutual Recognition Act of 1997. The process for application for recognition of registration in another jurisdiction varies according to the relevant jurisdiction.

Teaching in Australian jurisdictions generally requires a four-year qualification (Western Australia is the only exception). Teacher education programs are provided by universities, which must have their programs certified with the relevant state or territory regulatory body.

The Australian Institute for Teaching and School Leadership (AITSL) is a not-for-profit corporation established under federal legislation and reporting to the federal Minister for Education. It does not directly regulate the teaching profession, which is the responsibility of the state and territory regulatory authorities. However, it does maintain the Australian Professional Standards for Teachers (APSTs), which every Australian jurisdiction maintains as part of its teacher registration system. The APSTs have four stages: Graduate, Proficient, Highly Accomplished, and Lead. The Graduate standard is the level assessed for entry-level teachers, while Proficient standard generally equates to the standard expected of a teacher with one or more years of full-time teaching experience, or equivalent. The Lead and Highly Accomplished stages exist to recognise the highest level of professional experience and expertise. AITSL also accredits the national standards for teacher training programs, which are overseen by the state and territory regulatory bodies.

The seven Australian bodies are joined with the Teaching Council of Aotearoa New Zealand (TCANZ) in a collective organisation called the Australasian Teacher Regulation Authorities (ATRA).

== Canada ==
In Canada provinces have jurisdiction over education. In some provinces certification is handled through a provincial government department while in others a provincial College of Teachers has responsibility. Generally the requirements are for an undergraduate university degree plus a one- or two-year Bachelor of Education or equivalent.

For general overviews, the governing departments or Colleges usually have dedicated websites, accessible here: http://www.edu.gov.mb.ca/k12/profcert/province.html

In Manitoba, for example, the responsibility for teacher certification lies with the Department of Education, Citizenship, and Youth - Professional Certification and Records Branch. Teachers need a Bachelor's degree in Education (B.Ed.), often on top of another recognized bachelor's degree. This adds one or two more years to a university education.

To earn a degree in secondary education, teachers must have a certain number of university credits in their subject field. This number varies from province to province, and in some provinces it varies from school to school. Most employers of teachers require that successful applicants complete criminal record checks, as well as verification that an employee is not listed in the Child Abuse Registry. These same requirements are, in addition to being a sound part of the hiring practice, a requirement of most provincial education legislation. Other requirements such as a tuberculosis test, and level of experience criteria may also be required. Many provinces require prospective teachers to obtain a criminal record check prior to hire.

In extreme circumstances, such as a lack of any suitable certifiable candidates for a specific teaching position, an employer may apply for temporary certification of a non-certified person. This temporary certification is usually valid for one calendar year after ministry approval, but must be requested by the school, not by a non-certified applicant for a teaching position.

== Finland ==
Education system in Finland is globally exceptional as teachers need a master's degree in education (M.Ed.) to be qualified for teaching on primary or secondary education. The success in Finland's high OECD PISA scores is strongly influenced by the high education level of teachers.

== France ==
In France, teachers (professeurs) are mainly civil servants, recruited by competitive examination. They must have previously gained college education and receive professional education in IUFMs (University Institutes for Teachers Training). They were replaced by the Ecoles Supérieures du Professorat et de l'Education [ESPE] (Higher Schools of Teaching and Education) in 2013. MAs in Education (Master Métiers de l'Enseignement, de l'Education et de la Formation / MEEF) were also created in 2013. Since 2010, one has to hold a master's degree to become a (qualified) teacher. There are six corps of teachers in France's public service:

- Professeurs des écoles: Primary education teachers. They pass the CRPE competitive exam.
- Professeurs certifiés: high school, mainly junior high, teachers. They hold the CAPES (certificate for teaching in secondary education) or the CAPET (certificate for teaching in technological education).
- Professeurs de l'enseignement privé: private schools teachers. They hold the CAFEP (certificate for teaching in private secondary education).
- Professeurs de lycées professionnels: vocational high schools teachers. They hold the CAPLP (certificate for teaching in vocational high schools).
- Professeurs de l'enseignement physique et sportif: sport teachers. They hold the CAPEPS (certificate for teaching sport education).
- Professeurs agrégés: high school teachers who may also teach in post-high school programs (e.g. university and "classes preparatoires aux grandes ecoles" preparatory program to prepare students to take competitive exam to enter in engineer or business school). They pass the Agrégation very competitive exam. A very prestigious title, often required for applying at academic positions. They represent a minority in high schools.

In addition, every holder of a licentiate may teach on a non-permanent basis.

== Hong Kong ==
There are two types of recognised teacher statuses in Hong Kong: Registered teacher (the higher qualification) and permitted teacher (the temporary, lower qualification). Private schools may be exempted from having teachers of either statuses.

Registered teachers' qualified status is the highest form available for a professional qualification in the field in Hong Kong, and it is theoretically permanent for its holder with the possibility of the status being stripped off by the government in the case of a violation of the law or the professional code. Permitted teachers are not considered qualified teachers, and their statuses are only temporary and subject to annual renewal and review.

Registered teachers are not discipline or level bounded, whilst permitted teachers may be, with the school intending to hire having to first consult the government on the suitability of said applicant.

Usually, graduates fulfilling the requirements below can apply to be registered as a teacher:

1. A holder of a valid and locally recognised teaching qualification from a recognised university, i.e. a five-year Bachelor of Education (BEd) degree or a Postgraduate Diploma in Education (PGDE). Postgraduate Certificates in Education (PGCE) are no longer considered, and neither a Master of Education nor a Doctor of Education degree from anywhere is considered a teaching qualification. The Education University of Hong Kong, The University of Hong Kong, Chinese University of Hong Kong, and Hong Kong Baptist University are currently the only recognised institutions.
2. A holder of a recognised, usually local, associate degree or its equivalent. Even though a bachelor's degree is not stated as an explicit requirement, it is very rare for any applicant to not have one, and all new registered teachers have been graduates. This requirement is indeed an obsolete one as it is now not possible to obtain a teaching qualification without first, or together, obtaining an undergraduate degree.
3. Hong Kong citizenship or employment with an approved valid work visa from the government.
4. Availability of two referees.
5. A clean criminal record.
6. The submission of an application and declaration form.
7. Satisfactory performance in the subsequent interview.
8. Usually, but not always, full-time employment from a registered school and their endorsement.

The below requirements are for applicants going for permitted teachership: 2, 3, 4, 5, 6, 7 above; and employment and endorsement from a registered school for a full-time position, as well as the commitment to obtain a proper teaching qualification in the future.

All successful applicants are given a certificate with a unique license number. Holders are to use post-nominal letters RT and PT.

The government holds the right not to register or permit anyone to teach with no clear reasons.

== Russia ==
Russian schools have two types of teachers: primary school teachers and teachers who specialize in a single subject. Educational requirements for teachers vary, however teachers with a certified degree are preferred.

Primary school teachers teach subjects such as grammar, reading and arithmetic. A high level of specialist knowledge is not required at the primary school level, however child pedagogy is very important.

Pedagogical skills and knowledge are taught in Pedagogical Universities Teachers who specialise in a single subject usually have a degree in the field in which they teach, for example a teacher of physics will have a technical degree in physics or mathematics.

== India ==
In India, the National Council for Teacher Education (NCTE) determines the qualifications required for being a school teacher (e.g. B.Ed., B.El.Ed., D.El.Ed., etc. for different types and levels of teaching) and the Right to Education Act requires that all teachers have to hold one of these qualifications.

State governments as well as school chains under the Central Government (for example, Kendriya Vidyalayas, Jawahar Navodaya Vidyalayas) generally insist on teachers holding these qualifications. However, many private schools recruit teachers without these qualifications, often citing the poor quality of the qualification as a reason. In-service training of government teachers is done by the District Institutes of Education and Training (DIETs).

In colleges, faculty appointment is based on the national/state level examinations and qualifications decided by University Grants Commission India (UGC).

Private market-based teacher certification is an emerging concept in India with several teachers starting to take up independent certifications such as those offered by Centre for Teacher Accreditation (CENTA) or the training followed by certification offered by Cambridge.

== Indonesia ==
Starting from 2007, millions of in-service school teachers in Indonesian public and private formal schools have participated in the national teacher certification program named Pendidikan Profesi Guru (PPG). This is part of a nationwide educator certification system that aims to improve teachers' and lecturers' professionalism and welfare. It was established as the implementation of the Teacher and Lecturer Act of 2005, one of the ground-breaking pieces of legislation and government regulations in the education sector deliberated during the Susilo Bambang Yudhoyono administration. To qualify for the program, a school teacher must first of all have a four-year diploma or an undergraduate degree from a recognized tertiary institution. Junior or pre-service teachers with achievements are encouraged to take part in a teacher certification program through teacher training that lasts two semesters; senior teachers are required to take part in teacher certification through portfolio assessment and online courses.

These two types of teacher certification are conducted in teacher certification centers (Lembaga Pendidikan Tenaga Kependidikan, abbreviated LPTK. Literally "Educational Workforce Education Agency") throughout Indonesia. The majority of these centers are located in state and private universities that were once teachers' colleges and are still running teacher training programs. Successful participants will receive an "Educator Certificate" (Sertifikat Pendidik) entitling the holders to, among others, post-nominal degree Gr. (from "guru", Indonesian word for "teacher"), financial incentives, and chances for career promotion.

== Philippines ==
Teachers in the Philippines must be licensed by the Professional Regulation Commission through passing a board exam for professional teaching as mandated by Republic Act 7836 titled the Philippine Teachers Professionalization Act of 1994. The exam can be only taken by people who have a bachelor's degree in education such as a Bachelor of Elementary Education and a Bachelor of Secondary Education) or having 18 units of professional education subjects for other bachelor's degrees. The exam is mainly divided into two types, elementary board exam and secondary board exam. The exam contains two main areas which are general education for general knowledge and professional education for pedagogy and appropriate regulations in teaching. Secondary education exams will have an additional subject major based on the test-taker's course major such as English, Filipino, mathematics, science, social science, and livelihood education.

Once the teacher passes the exam and have taken their professional oath, they will be given the title "Licensed Professional Teacher". The title "LPT" is used to append after the licensed teacher's name. However, using "LPT" without a licence is illegal, as per impersonating a licensed professional. As per section 28 of RA 7836, a teacher cannot practice in the Philippines without a valid teaching licence, but lax enforcement has led to unlicensed teachers practicing in private institutions. Still, only licensed teachers are allowed to teach in public schools.

== Singapore ==
Teachers in Singapore teaching at government primary and secondary schools (including Junior Colleges) must attain a Diploma in Education (Dip.Ed) or a Post Graduate Diploma in Education (PGDE). Both qualifications can be obtained only at the National Institute of Education (NIE), Nanyang Technological University (Singapore).

Information can be found here: Diploma programmes, PGDE, Information about Teacher Recruitment

== Spain ==
In Spain, teaching primary education requires a university degree in education. Teaching secondary education, post-secondary pre-university and non-university professional training requires an undergraduate degree in a related field and a postgraduate degree in education known as MESOB or Master in Secondary Education. This degree includes courses in psychology, sociology, educational administration and specific courses on teaching a given subject, a teaching internship and master thesis.

== Sweden ==
In Sweden, only registered teachers and preschool teachers will be eligible for permanent employment, after 1 December 2013, with a few exceptions. The head-master is responsible for grading if the teacher is not registered. Only registered teachers can be mentor to new teachers during their probationary year, which is required for registration. Since 1 July 2011, teachers and preschool teachers in Sweden can apply for registration by the Swedish National Agency for Education. The purpose of the reform is to raise the level of skills among teachers and preschool teachers so as to improve the quality of educational services. A long-term goal is also to achieve an increase in the salary of teachers to make teacher studies more attractive and attract stronger students.

== United Kingdom ==
=== England and Wales ===
In England and Wales teachers in the maintained sector must have gained Qualified Teacher Status (QTS) and be registered with either the General Teaching Council for England or the General Teaching Council for Wales. There are many paths in which a person can work towards gaining their QTS, the most popular of which is to have completed a first degree (such as a BA or BSc) and then a Postgraduate Certificate in Education (PGCE) or Level 5 Diploma in Education and Training (DET). Other methods include a specific teaching degree or on-the-job training at a school. All qualified teachers in England must serve, after training, a statutory one year induction period that must be passed in order to remain a registered teacher.

In Wales, this period lasts for two years. During this period a teacher is known as an NQT (Newly Qualified Teacher). Schools are obliged to provide guidance, support and training to facilitate the NQT's success during this year. Local education authorities are also obliged to provide professional development opportunities.

Teachers in independent schools are not statutorily required to hold QTS, although independent schools increasingly prefer teachers to hold this qualification unless they have already gained significant teaching experience. The post-experience PGCE at the University of Buckingham is designed for independent school teachers. Some specialist independent schools, such as those following Montessori principles, require teachers trained in that specific educational philosophy.

The Teach First scheme, aimed at recent graduates, was introduced in 2003 in London, and more recently in Manchester, and it allows trainees to teach in schools without the Postgraduate Certificate in Education (PGCE). After an intense period of training in the summer following graduation, trainees are placed in secondary schools. Following the successful completion of the first year, trainee teachers gain QTS status and a PGCE and may then continue teaching for a minimum of one year.

=== Northern Ireland ===
Teachers must be recognised as having 'eligibility to teach' by the General Teaching Council for Northern Ireland. Eligibility to teach is very similar to Qualified Teacher Status in England and Wales, with near-identical requirements.

=== Scotland ===
Teachers in Scotland must attain a teaching qualification, which is similar to Qualified Teacher Status in England and Wales, where they can then apply for registration with the General Teaching Council for Scotland. All qualified teachers in Scotland must serve, after training, a statutory probationary period of up to 270 days of actual teaching, in order to meet the stringent benchmarks set by GTCS. Schools are again obliged to provide guidance, support and training to facilitate the NQT's success during this year.

== United States ==
In the United States, rules and procedures for certification vary by state, and are usually regulated by the state Department of Education. Normally, a bachelor's degree with a major in a certifiable area (English/language arts, fine arts, science, math, etc.) is a minimum requirement, along with rigorous coursework in pedagogical methods and practical field experiences as "student teachers." Many states also require that teachers pass standardized exams at the national or state levels in the subjects they teach and the methods of teaching those subjects, and that they undergo supervised evaluation during their first years of teaching. Some states use graduated licensing programs (i.e., initial, Stage II, Rank I, professional, provisional, etc.). In some cases, a license to teach in one state can facilitate the obtainment of a license in another state.

In some states, alternate route teacher certification is permitted. New Jersey was the first state to establish an Alternate Route program, doing so in 1984. Since then, most states have established their own programs.

Teachers in all states must have a Bachelor's degree. Many states require appropriate teacher preparation coursework before employment or the completion of a content-based or teaching-based Master's degree within a stated number of years. Additionally, to be permanently certified, many states require that teachers pass exams on pedagogy, general knowledge and knowledge of a content area. Some states require teacher candidates to be fingerprinted prior to certification.

The two companies responsible for developing and administering the majority of teacher certification tests in the United States are Educational Testing Service (ETS) and the Evaluation Systems group of Pearson Education (formerly National Evaluation Systems, Inc.). ETS offers the Praxis tests, which are standardized across the nation ("off-the-shelf tests"), while Pearson customizes each testing program for the individual state in which it is offered. In general, it is easier to transfer certification between two states that both use the Praxis test, as the retaking of tests is usually not required in those instances. Contracts to manage state testing procedures are usually put out for bidding from different testing companies every 4–6 years.

In addition, the National Board for Professional Teaching Standards, an independent Non-Governmental Organization based in Alexandria, VA, offers voluntary certification to teachers, school counselors, and school library/media specialists. National Board Teaching Certification is widely regarded as a highly prized distinction. While every state has some form of recognition for these National Board Certificates, the specific nature of that recognition varies from state to state.

The 2010 rankings of U.S. News & World Report placed the following schools of education in the top ten of all graduate colleges of education in the United States. They follow in order of one through ten: Peabody College (Vanderbilt University); Teachers College at Columbia University; Harvard University;Stanford University; University of Oregon; Johns Hopkins University; University of California - Los Angeles; Northwestern University; University of Wisconsin–Madison; and University of California at Berkeley.

Teach for America, The New Pathways to Teaching in New Jersey Program and the Mississippi Teacher Corps are three highly competitive, alternate-route teaching programs, for college graduates who are not education majors.

Teachers in California must also pass the California Basic Educational Skills Test.

== See also ==
- Pedeutology
- Alternative teacher certification
- College of Education
- Education Specialist
- National Board for Professional Teaching Standards
- Postgraduate Certificate in Education (United Kingdom)
- Postgraduate Diploma in Education
- Student teacher
- Teacher education
- Teacher training college
