= Legal recourse =

Topics referred to by the same term

A legal recourse is an action that can be taken by an individual or a corporation to attempt to remedy a legal difficulty.

- A lawsuit if the issue is a matter of civil law
- Contracts that require mediation or arbitration before a dispute can go to court
- Referral to police or prosecutor for investigation and possible criminal charges if the matter is a criminal violation
- Petition to a legislature or other law-making body for a change in the law if a law is thought to be unjust.
- Petition to a president or governor or monarch other chief executive or other official with power to pardon.

Recourse may also refer to:

- Recourse Technologies (founded 1999, acquired 2002), American network security company
- Recourse (formerly College and University Support Network.), a UK organization that merged into Education Support in 2015

== See also ==
- Habeas corpus
- Damnum absque injuria, loss without injury
- Arm's length principle
