= Frances Contreras =

Dean of University of California, Irvine School of Education

Frances Contreras is an American academic who is the dean of the University of California, Irvine School of Education. Beginning her tenure on January 1, 2022, she is the school's third dean in its history and the first Chicana/Latina dean to lead a school of education in the University of California system. She is also a professor, researcher and scholar.

Contreras' research includes equity and access issues for underrepresented students in the education pipeline and public policy's role in student equity across prekindergarten to post-college. Her most recent book, High Achieving African American Students and the College Choice Process: Applications of Critical Race Theory — written with Thandeka K. Chapman, Eddie Comeaux, Eligio Martinez Jr, and Gloria M. Rodriguez — examines the college choice process for high-achieving African-American students. She is also co-author with Patricia Gándara of the book The Latino Education Crisis: The Consequences of Failed Social Policies, which delves into the disadvantages facing Latino students in U.S. school systems.

Prior to UCI School of Education, she was associate vice chancellor for equity, diversity, and inclusion at UC San Diego and a professor at the university's Department of Education Studies. She also previously directed the higher education program at the University of Washington College of Education.

She earned her Ph.D. in education from Stanford University, an M.Ed. from Harvard University and Bachelor of Arts in History and Mass Communications from University of California, Berkeley. She is a first generation college student.

== Awards and honors ==
Contreras received the Washington State Commission on Hispanic Affairs' lifetime achievement award for her work addressing Latino student equity. In 2021, the City of San Diego declared December 17 as "Dr. Frances Contreras Day" to recognize her leadership and service to the city and county.
