= List of acts of the Parliament of Western Australia from 2004 =

This is a list of acts of the Parliament of Western Australia for the year 2004.

== 2004 ==
Short title, or popular name	Citation	Royal assent
Long title
Industrial Hemp Act 2004	No. 1 of 2004	12 March 2004
An Act to—: provide for the licensing of persons and partnerships to cultivate, harvest or process industrial hemp; amend the Misuse of Drugs Act 1981; (Note: Misuse of Drugs Act 1981 (No. 66)) and; amend the Poisons Act 1964, (Note: Poisons Act 1964 (No. 70)); and for related purposes.
Western Australian College of Teaching Act 2004	No. 8 of 2004	10 June 2004
An Act to—: establish the Western Australian College of Teaching; provide for membership of that College; recognise, promote and regulate the teaching profession in Western Australia; consequentially amend certain Acts, and for related purposes.
Railway and Port (The Pilbara Infrastructure Pty Ltd) Agreement Act 2004	No. 77 of 2004	8 December 2004
An Act—: to ratify, and authorise the implementation of, an agreement between the State and The Pilbara Infrastructure Pty Ltd and Fortescue Metals Group Ltd relating to the development of a multi-user railway and multi-user port facilities in the Pilbara region of the State; to amend the Railways (Access) Act 1998 (Note: Government Railways (Access) Act 1998 (No. 49)) and the Railways (Access) Code 2000, and for incidental and other purposes.
	No. X of 2004	
Criminal Procedure and Appeals (Consequential and Other Provisions) Act 2004	No. 84 of 2004	16 December 2004
An Act to—: repeal the Criminal Procedure (Summary) Act 1902; (Note: Criminal Procedure (Summary) Act 1902 (2 Edw. VII. No. 11)) and; amend The Criminal Code and various Acts, as a consequence of and in connection with the enactment of the—: Criminal Procedure Act 2004; (Note: Criminal Procedure Act 2004 (No. 71)) and; Criminal Appeals Act 2004, (Note: Criminal Appeals Act 2004 (No. 60)); and to amend various Acts in relation to procedural and other matters.

== Sources ==
- "legislation.wa.gov.au".
