= Substitute teacher =

Alternative for a classroom teacher when the latter is unavailable

A substitute teacher is a person who teaches a school class when the regular teacher is absent or unavailable; e.g., because of illness, personal leave, maternal or paternal leave and so on. "Substitute teacher" (usually abbreviated as sub) is the most commonly used phrase in the United States, South Africa, Canada (except Ontario and New Brunswick), India and Ireland, while supply teacher is the most commonly used term in Great Britain and the Canadian provinces of Ontario and New Brunswick. The term cover teacher is also used in Great Britain. Common synonyms for substitute teacher include relief teacher or casual relief teacher (used in Australia and New Zealand, commonly appreciated as relief) and "emergency teacher" (used in some parts of the United States). Other terms, such as "guest teacher", are also used by some schools or districts. Regional variants in terminology are common, such as the use of the term teacher teaching on call (TTOC) in the Canadian province of British Columbia and occasional in Ontario.

In the United States, substitute teachers find jobs by first completing the application and interview process from their local school district. Once approved, they will either be enrolled in an automated calling system or more currently, via a system that uses the internet to post available substitute teaching assignments. Substitutes can also find work by contacting private schools in their district. Most substitute teachers in the US can be assigned to work in all academic subject areas as needed (except for long-term substituting assignments). The substitute is generally responsible for closely following and continuing with the lesson plans left by the teacher, and to maintain student order and productivity. As with locum tenens physicians, the idea is that continuity exists between the work done by the substitute and that done by the other professional. Substitute teachers work with the same students as the regular teacher does. Substitute teachers can often work in multiple schools within one district, as well as for multiple school districts.

== General qualifications ==
In some regions, the qualifications for substitute teaching may not be as strict as those for a regular teacher. Most areas require a college degree, and some the successful completion of competency tests; others require only that the applicant possess a high school diploma or its equivalent; full teaching qualifications are required for long-term assignments. Long-term substitutes, who may be assigned to a class for up to an entire semester, generally require full teaching qualifications in the subject area of the class to be taught. Some school administrators may not hire full-time teachers unless they have had substitute teaching experience.

== Pay and benefits ==
The National Substitute Teachers Alliance estimated the national average pay for a substitute teacher in the United States in 2015 as $105 per day with a range of $20 (although $3.08 per hour would be below minimum wage in any state) to $190, although most districts pay well below $100 per day. In Connecticut, for example, the typical rate in a city/town district is about $80 per day (or $11.43 per hour). A few state schools pay as much as $150 per day. The Alliance also reported substantial variation in benefits with substitute teachers in some locales receiving no benefits while others receive sick time, retirement, or other benefits especially in areas where substitute teachers have a union. The comparatively lower wages for employees of school districts is often credited to the shorter work day (6.22–7.17 hours). The length of time spent each day by people at jobs in the private sector is roughly 15 percent longer.

Average U.S. salaries (2015)	
Principal	$90,410
Teacher	$56,282
Substitute Teacher (if 182 days worked)	$14,560

In the US, substitute teachers can also be supplied to school districts from agencies, and substitutes can work for multiple school districts through the same agency.

In Australia, the rate can vary between states and between sectors. Casual Relief Teachers must be fully qualified teachers. In the state of Victoria, relief teachers in the government sector earn $383.13 per day (as of 1 October 2020) and teachers in a Catholic school can earn $41 per hour or $246 per day, whereas in the New South Wales public school system, teachers can earn between $239 and $327 per day depending on experience.

In the Republic of Ireland, substitute teachers in secondary schools are paid a rate of €46.85 per hour for qualified teachers and €40.85 for unqualified teachers. In primary schools qualified teachers are paid at a rate of €164.26 per day.

In Canada, substitute/supply teachers are fully certified teachers, and are paid regular salary when employed as long-term occasionals (LTO), or paid a daily rate of about $240 to $300 per day.

In the United Kingdom, supply teachers employed by a local education authority or school directly must be paid a daily rate of 1/195 of the annual salary to which they would be entitled were they employed in the position on a full-time basis. Teachers employed through agencies are not subject to this rule, unless they have been working for the same hiring institution for more than 12 weeks, but nevertheless daily rates are generally around £100–125.

== Substitute Educator's Day ==
The United States observes a Substitute Educator's Day, which was instituted by the National Education Association (Rinaldi). The purpose of this day is to highlight the role and importance of the substitute teacher by providing information about, advocating for, and helping to increase appreciation and respect for this unique professional. This day also focuses on the needs of substitutes, which include better wages and health benefits and continual professional development. Substitute Educator's Day is observed by some on the 3rd Friday of November during American Education Week.

National Substitute Teacher Appreciation Week, or SubWeek, is also observed by some districts in the US and is held the first full week in May.

== See also ==
- Student teacher
- Education
