= Studenten machen Schule =

Studenten machen Schule is an educational organization in Germany.

The program places student teachers in public schools during their university career in order to allow for a comprehensive work experience. To do so, seminars are designed to enhance methodological skills among elementary and high school students. These seminars are taught by the student teachers at German schools. The program started in 2007 and works with 150 schools in four federal states of Germany.

== Concept ==
Student teachers of all subjects develop method-oriented seminars for different school types. In high school, the focus lies on scholarly writing and presenting as well as media skill training and project management. For primary school students (grade 1–6) “Studenten machen Schule” offers seminars on learning techniques, presentation skills and media-supported language acquisition and improvement. All seminars are grouped into so called “modules” and last at least 90 min.

All contents are regularly evaluated and improved by a “Quality assurance team”. The team - also made up of student teachers – analyzes students’ and teachers’ feedback and act accordingly. Furthermore, expert partners, such as universities and parents’ associations, are integrated into the quality improvement process. The local school administration also supports the organization. Prof. Dr. Jürgen Zöllner and Christina Goetsch (Secretaries of Education in Berlin & Hamburg) consider the seminars to be enriching for schools.

Interested schools can book the different modules according to their own focus and integrate the seminars flexibly into their school days: The seminars take place during school projects, curriculum days, after school activities or during ordinary classes. “The university students contribute their time and knowledge to the schools” remarks the principal of one school, Manfred Streich.

== History ==
“Studenten machen Schule” was founded in 2007 by Robert Greve, Jasmin Bildik and Lisa Stock. The three student teachers discovered the opportunity to teach scholarly techniques at Berlin grammar schools to prepare graduates for their last exam – an academic presentation. After a constant expansion of the seminars and a rapid growth in resource in Berlin the program started in Hamburg and Brandenburg in 2010 as well as in Hesse in 2011.

== Present achievements ==
Only four years after the foundation of “Studenten machen Schule” the program has 150 partner schools and about 80 student teachers are enrolled. Eight employees work in the offices and about 25,000 students have been trained in the seminars.

About 95% of the partner schools book seminars in the following year for the next generation of students. In preparation for a scholarly monitoring of the program, “Studenten machen Schule” started asking for detailed feedback of all participants. The first results will be analyzed in 2013.

== Funding ==
“Studenten machen Schule” works without government grants or private sponsoring. In fact, the organization follows the approach of a social enterprise in which the schools decide themselves if they want to make use of the seminars and how to finance them. Schools finance the program according to defined rates with the help of in-house budgets, sponsors or co-payment by the parents.

After being founded as the non-profit organization “Studenten machen Schule e.V.” the organization was changed into a social enterprise, the S.W.iM. UG. T.

== Criticism ==
The program is not subject of public criticism. Nevertheless, it still has to answer people who are of the opinion that the seminars’ content should be taught by teachers rather than outsource the training. This is supported by the journalist Susanne Klaiber who thinks that the teachers should take on that task. The organization itself does not see an outsourcing of teachers’ responsibilities. It rather sees an additional support for students and teachers. Schools, nowadays, are encouraged to find external experts to allow for a change in everyday school life. In addition to the benefits for schools the student teachers also profit from the early work experience.
