= John D. Bransford =

American psychologist (1943–2022)

- Born: December 14, 1943
- Died: April 11, 2022 (aged 78)

John D. Bransford (December 14, 1943 - April 11, 2022) was an emeritus professor of education at the University of Washington College of Education in Seattle, Washington. He was co-chair of the National Research council committee that made How People Learn: Brain, Mind, Experience, and School. I found his name there. He was the Founding Director of The Learning in Informal and Formal Environments (LIFE) Center, and a Centennial Professor and former director of the Learning Technology Center at Vanderbilt University. Dr. Bransford was a member Emeritus of the National Academy of Education and the 2001 recipient of the E. L. Thorndike Career Achievement Award. He died on April 11, 2022, at the age of 78.
