= Katherine K. Merseth =

American educator and academic

Katherine K. Merseth is an American educator and academic who served as a senior lecturer at the Harvard Graduate School of Education (HGSE) from 1983 to 2018. Her work has focused on teacher education, mathematics education, charter schools, and case-based instruction. At Harvard, she founded the Teacher Education Program and the School Leadership Program and was involved in initiatives addressing children's education and teacher development.

== Education and Career ==
Merseth earned a doctorate in education from Harvard University in 1982. Before and during her academic career, she worked in mathematics education and teacher preparation. Her work at Harvard included developing programs for educators and teaching courses on educational policy, equity, and excellence in American schools.

For undergraduates, Merseth founded the Education Studies Curricular Minor and the Harvard Teacher Fellows Program. She also taught the undergraduate course Dilemmas of Equity and Excellence in American K–12 Education, which attracted substantial student interest.

== Research and Publications ==
=== Mathematics education and case-based instruction ===
Merseth's research has examined the use of cases in teacher education and educational leadership. Her publications include Windows on Teaching Mathematics: Cases of Secondary Mathematics Classrooms and Cases in Educational Administration. Her work has explored how classroom cases can help educators examine teaching practices, school leadership, and educational decision-making.

=== Charter Schools ===
In 2009, Merseth and her co-authors published Inside Urban Charter Schools: Promising Practices and Strategies in Five High-Performing Schools through Harvard Education Press. The book examined five high-performing urban charter schools in Massachusetts, using interviews, focus groups, and classroom observations to investigate school organization, leadership, culture, and educational practice.

In a 2011 review published in Education Review, Gary Hartzell described Inside Urban Charter Schools as an interesting and useful examination of five successful charter schools in the greater Boston area. He praised the book's organization, readability, and insights, particularly its analysis of school culture, leadership, organizational structures, and the alignment between a school's mission and its practices. Hartzell also identified limitations in the research methods and aspects of the analysis, while concluding that the book's strengths outweighed its weaknesses.

Merseth has also discussed charter-school leadership and educational reform in interviews and other published coverage. In a 2008 Education Week article about school leadership, she commented on the importance of finding and supporting effective school leaders.

=== International Work ===
Merseth's educational work has also extended internationally. According to her Harvard faculty profile, she edited four volumes of cases about classroom practice in South Africa, Chile, Brazil, and Jordan. These projects applied case-based approaches to educational practice in different national settings.

One example is Confronting Challenges: Case Studies for School Principals, a collection developed through work associated with the Harvard-Chille Innovation Initiative and Chilean education institutions. The cases address challenges encountered by school principals and are intended to support professional learning and school leadership. Another example is Dilemmas in Schools: A Casebook for Educators, a collection of cases developed with Jordanian teachers in collaboration with the Queen Rania Teacher Academy and Harvard's Middle Professional Learning initiative.

=== Recognition ===
Merseth was included in The Harvard Crimson's 2017 "15 Professors of the Year" feature, which profiled her teaching, work in teacher preparation, and views on equity and excellence in education.

In 2018, she received Harvard's Phi Beta Kappa Prize for excellence in teaching.

=== Selected Publications ===
- Windows on Teaching Mathematics: Cases of Secondary Mathematics Classrooms. Teachers College Press.
- Cases in Educational Administration (Longman).
- Inside Urban Charter Schools: Promising Practices and Strategies in Five High-Performing Schools. Harvard Education Press, 2009.
- Confronting Challenges: Case Studies for School Principals.
- Dilemmas in Schools: A Casebook for Educators.
