= Teacher Registration Board of Western Australia =

Teacher registration body

The Teacher Registration Board of Western Australia (TRBWA) is the body responsible for the registration of teachers in Western Australia. It registers all teachers that teach in a Western Australian primary and secondary educational venue, from early childhood to Year 12. The TRBWA is also responsible for the accreditation of initial teacher education programs in Western Australia.

It replaced the Western Australian College of Teaching which was dissolved in 2012 by Peter Collier following a litany of failures. Collier had remarked that the implementation of the TRBWA had been made necessary by the "high level of dissatisfaction among teachers in relation to the manner in which the registration process was being managed".

The TRBWA is a seven-member board appointed by the Minister for Education, and is supported by the Teacher Registration Directorate of the Department of Education which provides a secretariat function.
