= University of California, Irvine School of Education =

Academic unit

Coordinates: 33.647106°N 117.835821°W

School of Education
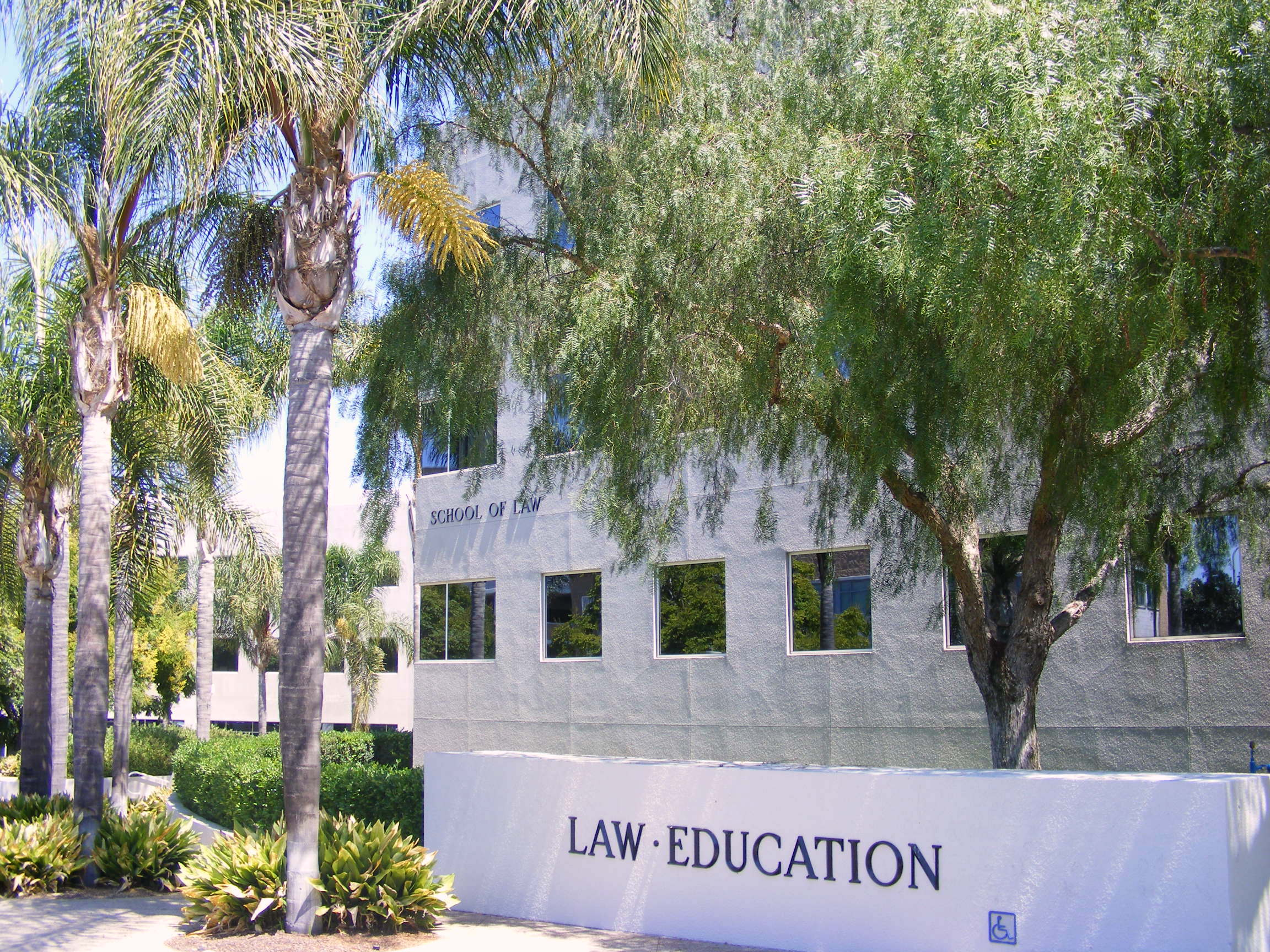
- The entrance to the UC Irvine Schools of Law and Education
- Former names: Office of Teacher Education; Department of Education
- Type: School of education
- Established: 1967
- Parent institution: University of California, Irvine
- Dean: Julie Washington
- Academic staff: 45
- Students: 801
- Undergraduates: 527
- Postgraduates: 274
- Doctoral students: 72
- Location: Irvine, California, United States
- Address: 3200 Education, Irvine, CA 92697-5500
- Website: Official website

The School of Education is one of the academic units at the University of California, Irvine. Historically, it has been ranked as one of the top schools of education in the United States and world.

== History ==
The University of California, Irvine School of Education was established as an independent school at UCI by the Regents of the University of California in 2012. The school began as the Office of Teacher Education in 1967 and became the Department of Education in 1991. In January 2022, Frances Contreras began her tenure as dean of the School. She is proceeded by Richard Arum and founding School of Education dean Deborah Lowe Vandell.

== Faculty ==
The School's interdisciplinary faculty includes psychologists, sociologists, economists, and linguists. Four professors are members of the National Academy of Education. One professor is a member of the National Academy of Sciences, and one professor is a fellow of the American Academy of Political and Social Science. In total, the School has 28 senate faculty, 48 clinical faculty and lecturers, 28 professional and support staff, and 17 other affiliated faculty.

== Academic programs ==
The School offers graduate, credential, and undergraduate programs. The school offers a Ph.D. in Education for students looking for careers in educational research. The school also offers a Master of Arts in Teaching with teaching credentials. The school has an undergraduate program in Education Sciences.

== Rankings ==
In 2022, the U.S. News & World Report ranked the UCI School of Education 10th among graduate schools of education and fourth among public schools of education. The National Council on Teacher Quality/U.S. News & World Report ranked the School of Education's Cal Teach Math & Science Teacher Education Program as number one in California, number one in the Western Region, and number eight in the nation for quality of teacher preparation. Relative to other Schools of Education, the School ranks in the top 1% in the number of faculty members with grants, the top 1% in number of faculty articles published in peer-reviewed journals and the top 1% in number of faculty articles cited.
