= Western Australian College of Teaching =

Defunct teacher registration body in Western Australia

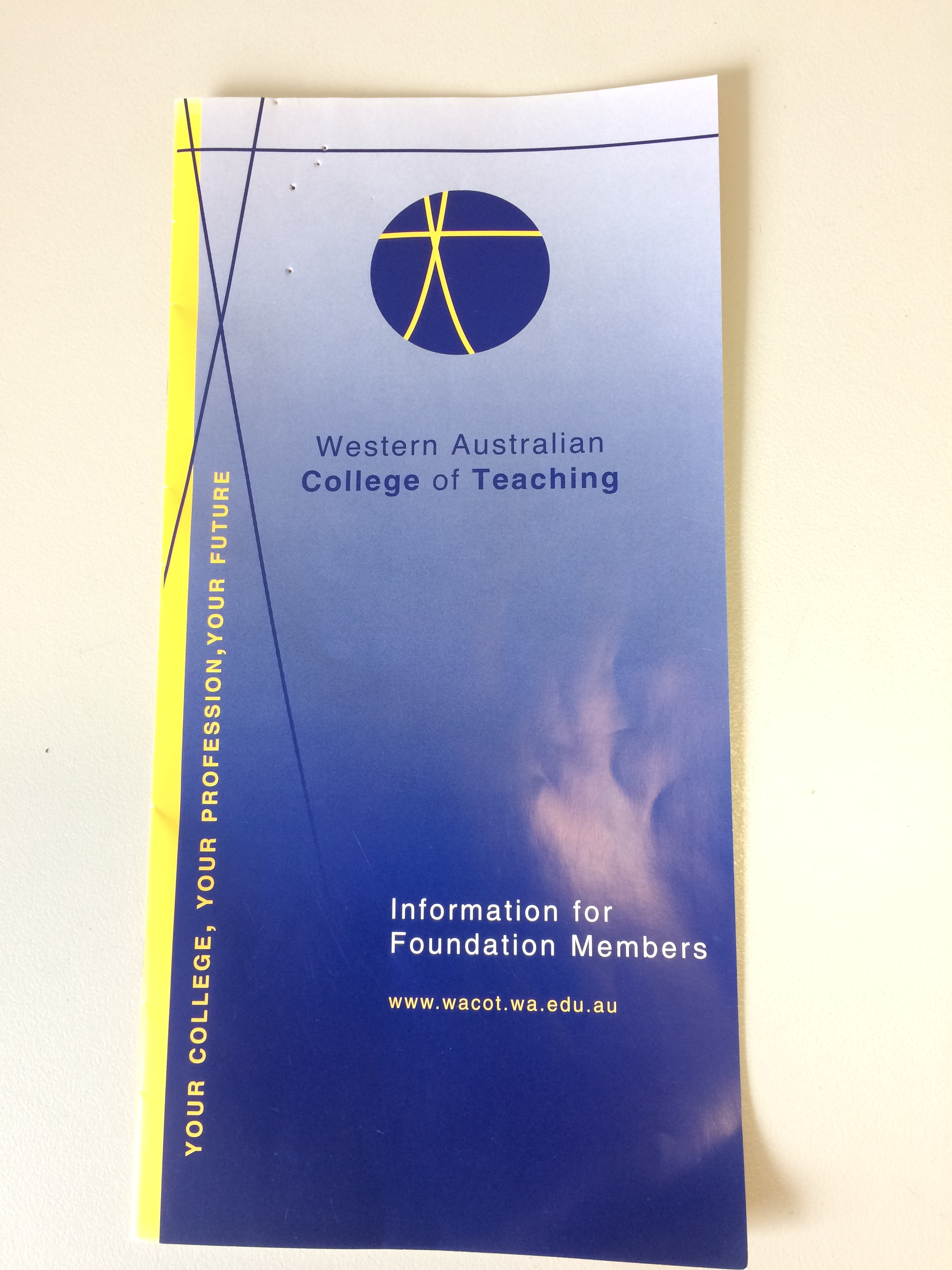
Western Australian College of Teaching (WACOT) brochure

The Western Australian College of Teaching, commonly referred to as WACOT, is a defunct teacher registration board set up in Western Australia by the Gallop Labor Government by the then education minister Alan Carpenter in 2004. Carpenter introduced the Western Australian College of Teaching Act 2004 which was passed by parliament in June 2004. The purpose of the college was to enhance the status of the teaching profession and teachers and to administer the registration of teachers in Western Australia.

The act required a board of 19 members, nine to be appointed by the minister and ten to be elected by members. When WACOT was established in 2004 the minister appointed all 19 members with ten being temporary appointments until an election could be held, at some point in time after March 2006.

The foundation chair of WACOT was Brian Lindberg, who later faced criticism for his decision to deregister teachers who had refused to pay their registration fee, despite acknowledging there was a teacher shortage at the time.

In October 2006 the election of the board by members was declared void by the electoral commission after the discovery that the rules that governed the election were illegal. The WACOT board then rewrote the election rules and submitted them to parliament, who found them unsatisfactory, resulting in an even longer election delay. In September 2007, about 1,600 teachers faced deregistration for refusing to pay membership fees. Many teachers were boycotting WACOT for their inability to hold an election and effectively represent teachers. The election was eventually held in December 2007 with the ten board members elected.

By 2008, about 2,000 teachers were facing deregistration despite a teacher shortage for non-payment of their fees. The board of WACOT had held an extraordinary meeting and had agreed to deregister non-paying members. Complaints levelled at WACOT included lengthy delays in processing registrations, sending out multiple demands for payment despite payment having been made, teachers having no involvement in the board, the board failing to hold elections, poor value for the fees being paid and a poor level of service offered by the college.

The executive director of WACOT, Suzanne Parry, said "the majority of teachers whose registration had been cancelled should be able to be reinstated within a day of supplying their paperwork" and that "many teachers were confused about the difference between annual membership renewal and re-registration" to justify why schools would be left without teachers.

WACOT was eventually dissolved in 2012 by Peter Collier following a litany of failures, and replaced with the Teacher Registration Board of Western Australia (TRBWA). Collier remarked that the implementation of the TRBWA had been made necessary by the "high level of dissatisfaction among teachers in relation to the manner in which the registration process was being managed".
