= School of education =

Division within a university in the U.S. Canada

A school of education (or college of education; ed school) is a division within a university that is devoted to scholarship in the field of education, which is an interdisciplinary branch of the social sciences encompassing sociology, psychology, linguistics, economics, political science, public policy, history, and others, all applied to the topic of elementary, secondary, and post-secondary education. The U.S. has 1,206 schools, colleges and departments of education and they exist in 78 per cent of all universities and colleges. According to the National Center for Education Statistics, 176,572 individuals were conferred master's degrees in education by degree-granting institutions in the United States in 2006–2007. The number of master's degrees conferred has grown immensely since the 1990s and accounts for one of the discipline areas that awards the highest number of master's degrees in the United States.

== History and areas of interest ==
Schools of education are historically rooted in the 19th-century normal schools. After the Civil War, universities began to include instruction in pedagogy, competing with normal schools in the preparation of teachers. Teachers College, Columbia University is the oldest graduate school of education in the United States, founded in 1887. Pedagogy and psychology, which previously were considered to be subsets of philosophy, gained status of legitimate collegiate academic disciplines thanks to William James and John Dewey. By 1900, most universities had some formal instruction in pedagogy. For a long time teacher education, curriculum, and instruction remained the core offering of schools of education.

By the 1930s, schools of education started training educational administrators such as principals and superintendents, and specialists such as guidance counselors for elementary and secondary schools.

Many graduates of schools of education become involved in education policy. As such, issues such as equity, teacher quality, and education assessment have become focuses of many schools of education. The issue of equitable access to education, specifically focusing on low-income, minority, and immigrant communities, is central to many areas of research within the education field.

== Types of programs ==
Typically, a school of education offers research-based programs leading to Master of Arts (MA), Master of Education (MEd), Doctor of Philosophy (PhD), Doctor of Education (EdD) or Educational Specialist (EdS) degrees, as well as professional teacher-education programs leading to Master of Science (MS), Master of Education (MEd), or Master of Arts in Teaching (MAT) degrees. Schools of education also offer teacher certification or licensure programs to undergraduate students. Generally schools of education have graduate programs related to teacher preparation, curriculum and instruction (or curriculum and teaching), public policy and education, and educational administration. In addition, some schools of education offer programs in school counseling and counseling psychology.

== Criticism ==
=== Low academic standards ===
Schools of education have been blamed for low academic standards. Critics argue that earning an advanced degree in education, specifically a master level degree, doesn't seem to actually make someone a better teacher. George Pólya quoted a typical pre-service secondary school mathematics teacher, "The mathematics department offers us tough steak which we cannot chew and the school of education [feeds us] vapid soup with no meat in it". Polya suggested that a college instructor who offered a methods course to mathematics teachers knew mathematics at least on the level of a master's degree and had some experience of mathematical research. Katherine Merseth, director of the teacher education program at Harvard University, described her opinion that graduate schools of education as the "cash cows of universities".

=== Emphasis on administration ===
Abraham Flexner called courses like "the supervision of the teaching staff", "duties of school officers", "awareness of situations and planning of behavior", "reflective thought as a basis for teaching method" to be "absurdities and trivialities". He admonished the attention "devoted to tests, measurements, organization, administration—including administration of the teaching staff and how to organize for planning the curriculum".

Lyell Asher blames the surge of residential life "curricula" on the selfish motives of the ed schools' administrators to present themselves not as resident advisers but as residence-hall "educators". He supports the argument of E. D. Hirsch that professors of education, "surrounded in the universities by prestigious colleagues whose strong suit is thought to be knowledge, have translated resentment against this elite cadre into resentment against the knowledge from which it draws its prestige". Mr. Hirsch warns that it is "never a healthy circumstance when people who are held in low esteem exercise dominant influence in an important sphere. The conjunction of power with resentment is deadly".

== Notable schools of education in the US ==
The annual rankings of U.S. News & World Report placed the following schools of education in the top 20 of all graduate education institutions in the United States for 2022. They follow here, with identical numbers indicating ties:

1. Harvard University
1. University of Pennsylvania
3. University of California—Los Angeles
4. University of Wisconsin–Madison
5. Vanderbilt University
6. New York University
6. Stanford University
8. Northwestern University
9. Teachers College, Columbia University
9. University of Michigan—Ann Arbor
11. Arizona State University
11. University of Southern California
13. University of Washington
14. University of Oregon
15. University of California—Irvine
16. University of Texas—Austin
17. Johns Hopkins University
17. University of Kansas
19. University of California—Berkeley
19. University of Virginia

== Notable scholars within schools of education ==
- David Berliner
- Benjamin Bloom
- Jerome Bruner
- George Counts
- Linda Darling-Hammond
- John Dewey
- Paulo Freire
- Nicholas Gage
- Howard Gardner
- James Paul Gee
- Henry Giroux
- Gene V Glass
- Stephen Krashen
- Gloria Ladson-Billings
- Peter McLaren
- Deborah Meier
- Nel Noddings
- Diane Ravitch
- Lee Shulman

== See also ==
- Normal school
- Teacher education
- Student teacher
- Certified teacher
- Alternative teaching certification
- Postgraduate Certificate in Education
- Postgraduate Diploma in Education
- Postgraduate education
- Postgraduate diploma
- Education Specialist
- Teacher training college
