= Recourse Technologies =

American network security company, 1999–2002

Recourse Technologies, Inc.
- Type: Private (1999–2002)
- Industry: Network security
- Founded: February 1999; 27 years ago
- Founder: Frank Huerta; Michael Lyle
- Defunct: 2002
- Fate: Acquired by Symantec, 2002
- Headquarters: Redwood City, California, United States
- Products: ManHunt, ManTrap
- Parent: Symantec (2002)

Recourse Technologies, Inc. was a network security company based in Redwood City, California, founded in February 1999 by Frank Huerta and Michael Lyle. The company developed network intrusion detection and deception technology, with its principal products being ManHunt and ManTrap. Symantec acquired Recourse Technologies on 17 July 2002 for US$135 million.

== Products ==
Recourse Technologies' primary products addressed network monitoring and attacker deception:

- ManHunt — a network intrusion detection system and security event manager that monitored network traffic for signs of unauthorised activity and correlated security events across an enterprise network.
- ManTrap — a honeypot system designed to detect and study attackers by presenting decoy systems that appeared to be legitimate targets, allowing security teams to observe attack methods without exposing production infrastructure.

== Acquisition by Symantec ==
Symantec announced its intent to acquire Recourse Technologies in July 2002, completing the acquisition for US$135 million. The ManHunt and ManTrap products were integrated into Symantec's enterprise security portfolio following the deal.
