= Pedeutology =

Branch of pedagogy

Pedeutology is a branch of pedagogy which mainly focuses on a teacher's characteristics which include their psychological, sociological, and characterological role in their respective fields (Rosić, 2011). The branch is different from deontology which emphasizes the teacher's rights, duties, and moral obligations towards their students. Research in the field commonly examine how a student's behavior and educational outcome can be influenced by their teachers.

== See also ==
- Pedagogy
- School of education
