= University of Washington College of Education =

School of education at the University of Washington in Seattle

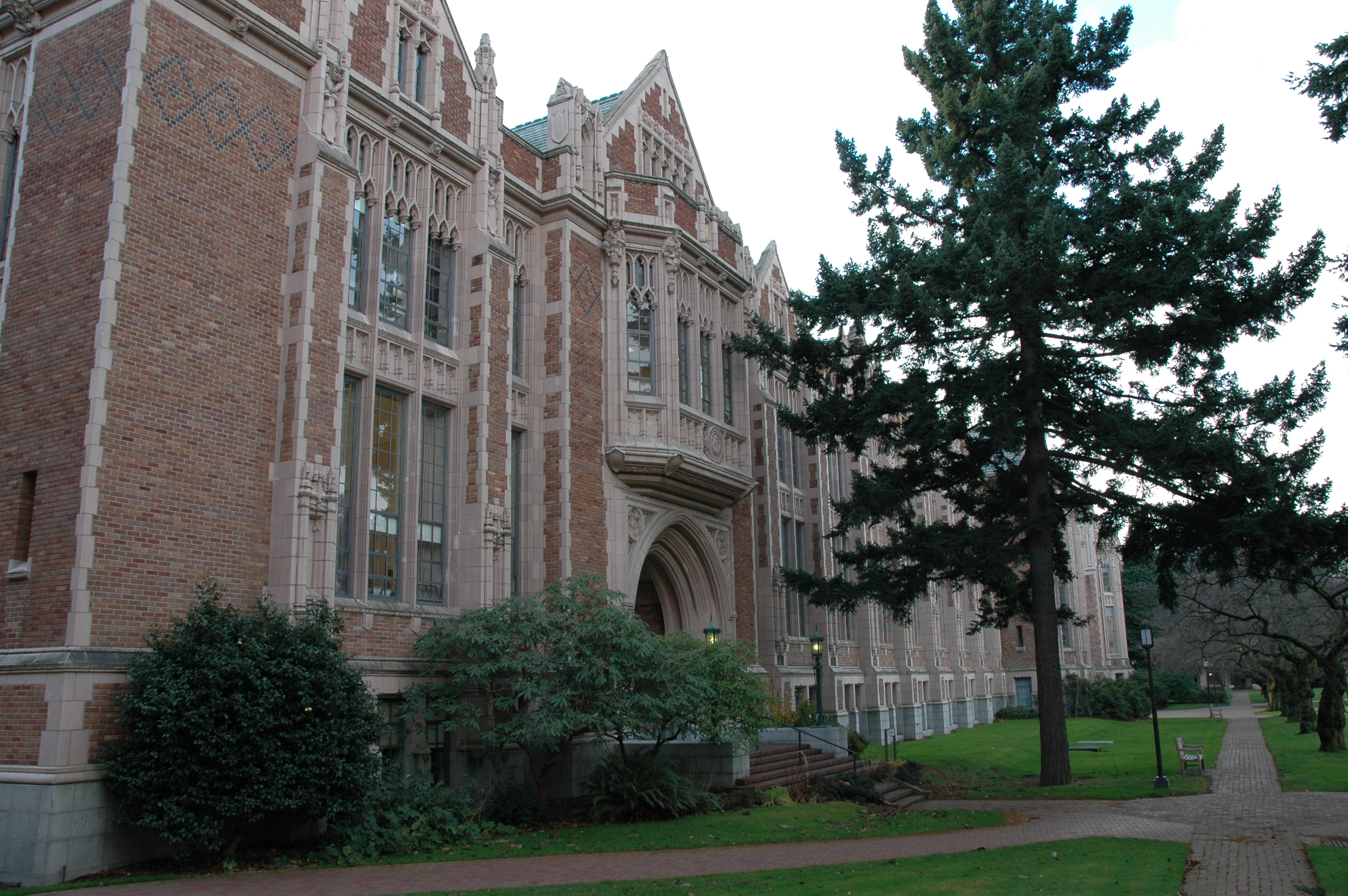
- Miller Hall, home of the University of Washington College of Education, in 2004.
- Other names: UW College of Education; UW COE
- Type: Public school of education
- Established: 1914
- Parent institution: University of Washington
- Dean: Dr. Mia Tuan
- Location: Miller Hall, Seattle, Washington, 98195, United States; 47°39′26″N 122°18′23″W
- Campus: Urban
- Website: education.uw.edu

The University of Washington College of Education is the school of education of the University of Washington. The College of Education offers both undergraduate and graduate degrees.

Led by Dean Mia Tuan, the mission of the UW College of Education is to transform inequitable systems of education to create just, sustainable and culturally-thriving democracies by engaging in dynamic, collaborative partnerships, practices and research.

== History ==
Preparing teachers was an important function of the University of Washington from its early days. After becoming the Territorial University's first graduate in 1876, Clara McCarty taught in various schools and was elected superintendent of the Pierce County School District in 1880.

The university established a specific program to train teachers, called the "Normal" curriculum, in 1878. The University of Washington Normal College was established in 1892–1893, with a series name changes occurring over the next several years: Department of Pedagogy, 1893–1894; Department of Education, 1895–1896; Department of Philosophy of Education, 1896–1897; Department of Education, 1897–1898; School of Pedagogy, 1898–1899; before the name Department of Education was retained for more than a decade beginning in 1900–1901.

On January 21, 1913, the university introduced a School of Education. The College of Education was officially formed December 15, 1914, as a four-year program with authority over graduation and curriculum decisions.

== Degree programs ==
The college offers two doctoral programs: the Doctor of Philosophy in Education (Ph.D.) and the Doctor of Education (Ed.D.). It also offers more than a dozen master's programs, including Education Policy, Organizations and Leadership; Early Childhood Special Education; Education Policy, Organizations and Leadership; Instructional Leadership; Intercollegiate Athletic Leadership; Language, Literacy, and Culture; Leadership in Higher Education; Learning Sciences and Human Development; Measurement and Statistics; Multicultural Education; Social and Cultural Foundations; Special Education; and Teaching. Bachelor's degree programs are offered in Early Care and Education; Early Childhood and Family Studies; and Education, Communities and Organizations.

== Faculty ==
Notable current and past faculty of the college include:

- James A. Banks
- John D. Bransford
- John Goodlad
- Elham Kazemi
- Kenneth Zeichner

== Notable alumni ==
Notable alumni of the college include:

- Diana Hess
- Gloria Ladson-Billings
- Charli Turner Thorne

== Facilities ==
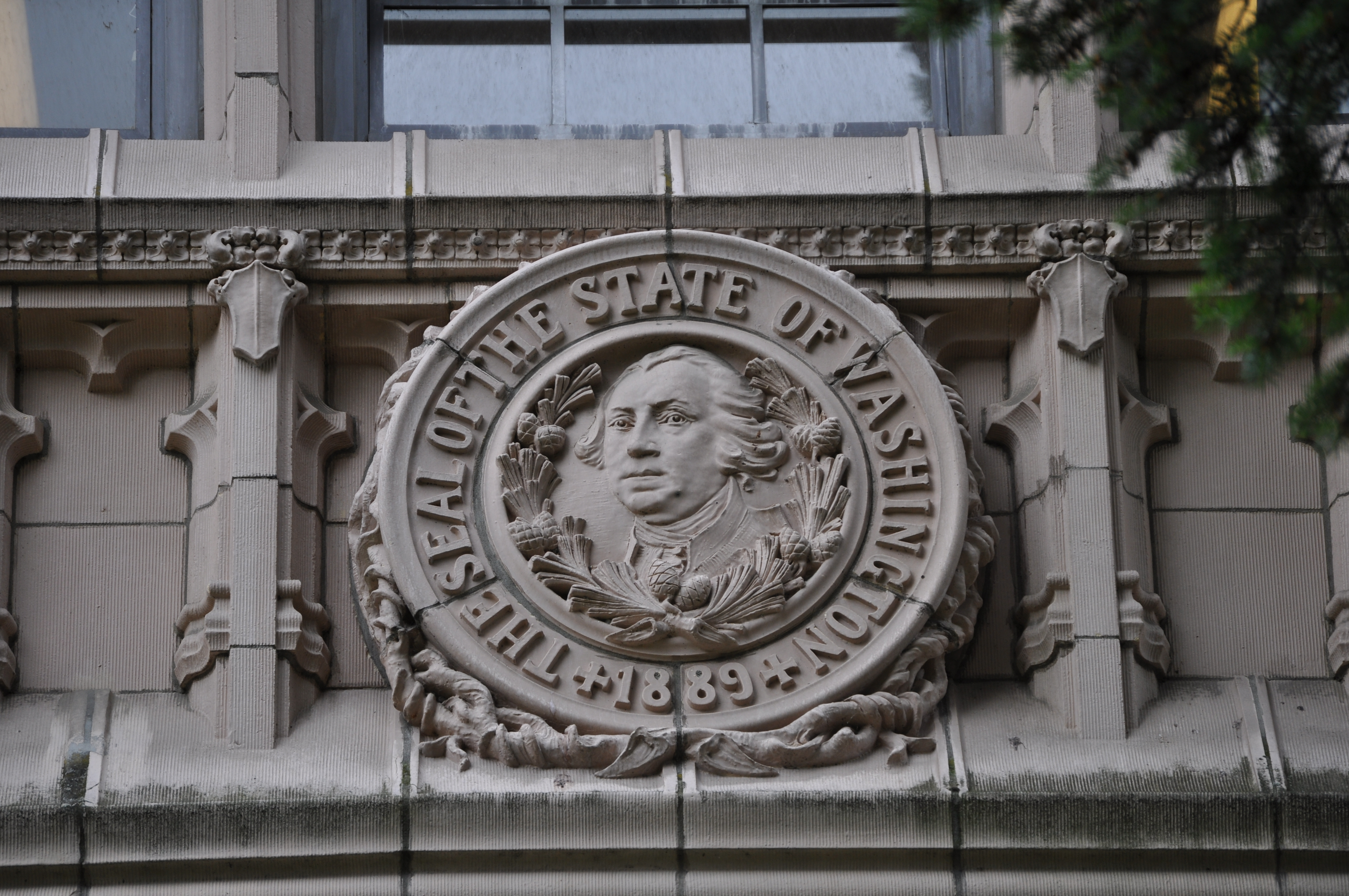
Terracotta of the Washington State Seal (1922). Miller Hall, July 2009.

The college's primary home is Miller Hall on the main campus of the University of Washington in Seattle. It is part of the Liberal Arts Quadrangle, commonly known as the Quad. Completed in 1922 and originally called Education Hall, the building was renamed in 1954 to honor the family of long-time University of Washington Regent William Winlock Miller. The building features a collection of more than 30 figures by Victor Alonzo Lewis along its cornice. The figures represent educational subjects such as music and geography; historical figures including Alexander the Great and Confucius; various professions; and methods of pedagogy (reading and laboratory experiments) among others. Miller Hall contains numerous classrooms and offices.

Other buildings associated with the college include the Haring Center for Inclusive Education and Gilman Building.
