= Education Support =

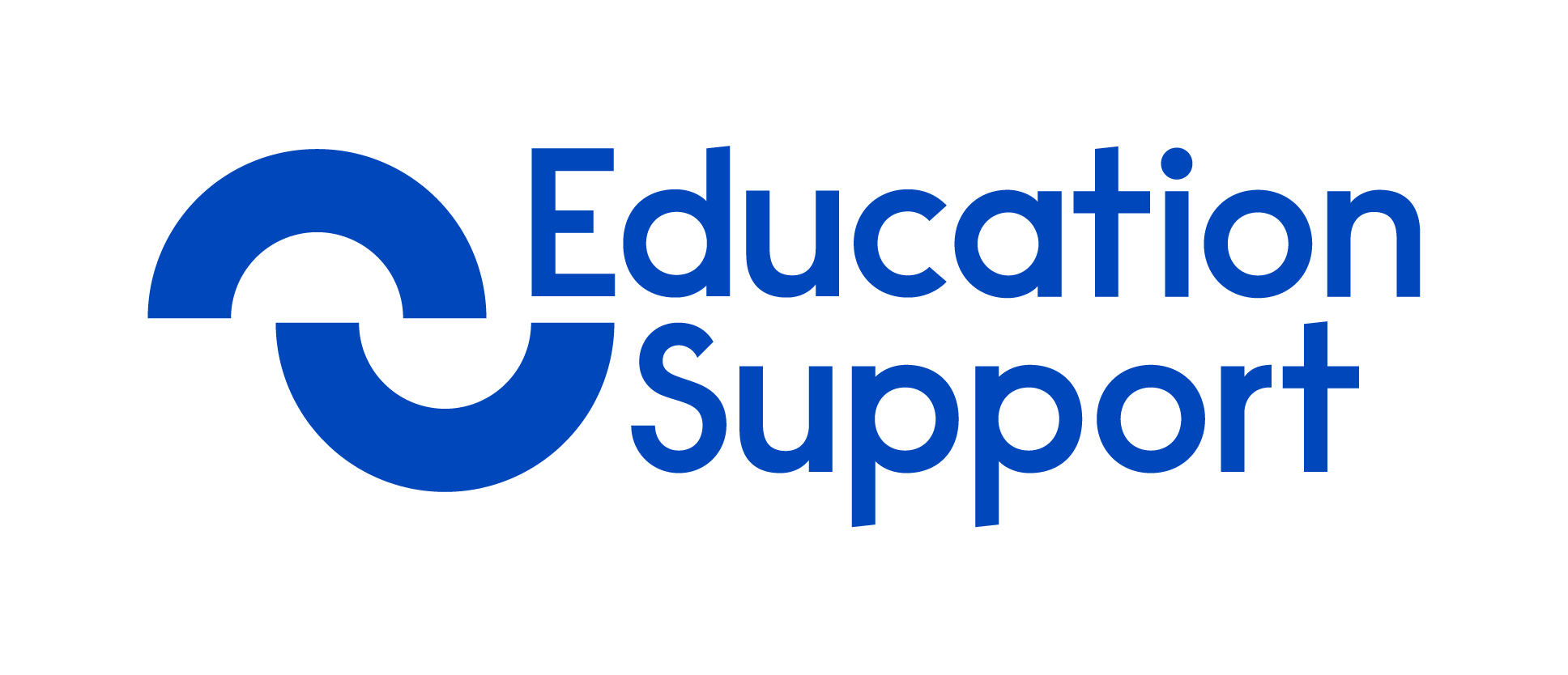
- Founded: 1877
- Type: Charity
- Purpose: UK charity supporting the mental health and wellbeing of everyone working in education.
- Region served: United Kingdom
- Key people: Sinéad Mc Brearty, Chief Executive
- Website: www.educationsupport.org.uk

Education Support is a UK charity "dedicated to improving the mental health and wellbeing of the education workforce".

Initially established in 1877 as a benevolent fund for teachers, but today supporting those in higher education and further education as well as schools. In September 2015 three sister organisations, Teacher Support Network, Recourse and Worklife Support, merged to create a new charity Education Support (previously known as Education Support Partnership).

It champions good mental health and wellbeing of teachers, lecturers, school leaders and support staff throughout their careers and during retirement as well as supporting education leaders to help improve professional and organisational development.

Education Support's services are open to trainees, newly qualified teachers, serving teachers, headteachers, and retired professionals, teaching assistants and all education staff, as well as staff in the adult, further, and higher education sectors.

The charity's areas of expertise include finance, housing, care issues, health, wellbeing at work, and career development.

It runs a 24x7 Helpline and also a Grants service.

== History ==
The organisation began as a benevolent fund for teachers, which was set up by the National Union of Teachers in 1877.

In September 1999, it launched its telephone counselling service for teachers suffering from work-related stress.

In 2001, it began offering online services such as email counselling and fact sheets of information useful to teachers.

In 2001, Teacher Support Scotland was established to provide specific support to teachers in Scotland. A year later Teacher Support Cymru was set up to provide similar support to teachers in Wales.

In 2006, the charity launched the college and University Support Network with, the support of the University and College Union. The new charity provided specialist support to all those working in post-school education.

In 2008, Teacher Support Network conducted a literature review which, for the first time, pulled together and evaluated the evidence available about teacher well-being.

In 2010, high-profile cases, including the Peter Harvey case, led to an increase in calls from teachers to the network.

In 2010, the Teacher Support Network and British Council for School Environments produced the 2010 School Environment Survey, with promotional assistance from Association of Teachers and Lecturers BBC News. In 2015, the Teacher Support Network, Recourse and Worklife Support Partnership became Education Support.

In 2019 Education Support was invited by the Department of Education to join an expert panel tasked with improving the mental health and wellbeing of teachers.

== Teacher Wellbeing Index ==
Education Support undertakes an extensive programme of research including the Teacher Wellbeing Index, an annual research report which provides comprehensive insight into the mental health and wellbeing of teachers and education staff.

The report findings are widely cited and discussed:

"A new report from Education Support assessing the impact of coronavirus on education professionals’ mental health found 52 per cent of teachers felt their mental health and wellbeing had suffered either considerably or a little."

"Helpline for teachers struggling with mental health problems receives record number of calls."

"Teachers least-likely professionals to 'pull a sickie'."

"Frequent rejection and a loss of control are making university staff isolated and ill, new research shows" "Trainee teachers need more mental health support"

"Teachers feel ‘a huge amount of guilt and a sense of shame in taking time off’ because of potential impact, says charity"

"'It's time we started looking after the people who look after the kids,' says teacher charity chief"

== See also ==
- Bullying in teaching
