= Student teacher =

Trainee teachers

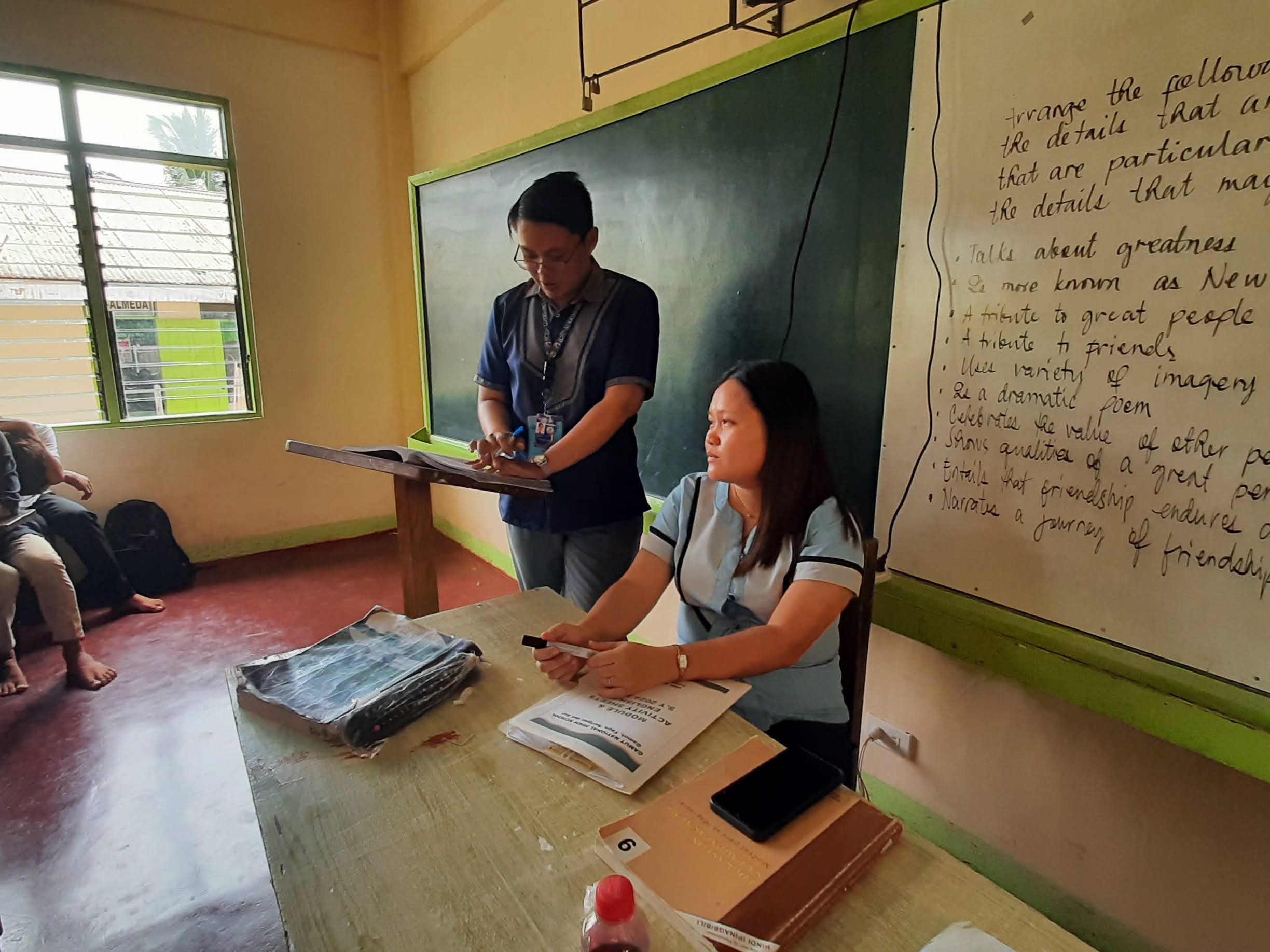
Student teacher with his cooperating teacher from the Philippines

A student teacher or prac teacher (practise teacher) is a college, university, or graduate student who is teaching under the supervision of a certified teacher in order to qualify for a degree in education. Student teachers undergo such internship as part of their course requirement or as a course of their programme itself.

The term is also often used interchangeably with pre-service teacher. It is a much broader term to include those students who are studying the required coursework in pedagogy, as well as their specialty, but have not entered the supervised teaching portion of their training. In many institutions pre-service teacher is the official and preferred title for all education students.

Student teaching is required for most teaching credentials.

== See also ==
- Certified teacher
- College of Education
- Education Specialist
- Monitorial System
- Postgraduate Certificate in Education (United Kingdom)
- Postgraduate Diploma in Education
- Pre-service teacher education
- Professional Graduate Certificate in Education (United Kingdom)
- Teacher education
- Teacher training college

== Bibliography ==
- Meyer-Botnarescue, H. and Machado, J. (2004) Student Teaching: Early Childhood Practicum Guide. Thomson Delmar Learning.
- Grim, P.R. and Michaelis, J.U. (1953) The Student Teacher in the Secondary School. Prentice-Hall.
- DellaValle, J. and Sawyer, E. (1998) Teacher Career Starter: The Road to a Rewarding Career. Career Starters.
- Wiggins, S.P. (1958) The Student Teacher in Action. Allyn and Bacon Publishers.
