= Educational specialist =

Degree

The Education Specialist, also referred to as Educational Specialist or Specialist in Education (Ed.S., EdS or S.Ed.), is a specialist degree in education which is an advanced professional degree in the U.S. that is designed to provide knowledge and theory in the field of education beyond the master's degree level. Generally, 30-65 hours of graduate study are required, depending on the specialty. Specializations are available in computing technology, educational leadership, training and development, school psychology, counselor education, special education, curriculum and instruction, career and technical education, and adult education.

These are highly specialized degrees meant for professionals who require advanced proficiency in a field such as adult education, instructional technology, curriculum and instruction, educational psychology, educational leadership or special education, but who do not have the time or desire to complete a dissertation.

== Academic dress ==
The academic dress worn by individuals holding an Educational Specialist degree includes a doctoral robe with a master's hood.

== See also ==
- College of Education
- Doctor of Education
- Educational leadership
- Adult education
- Training
- Training & Development
