= Preparing to Teach in the Lifelong Learning Sector =

The Preparing to Teach in the Lifelong Learning Sector (PTLLS) qualification, sometimes referred to colloquially as "Petals", is an initial teacher training qualification within the British Qualifications and Credit Framework (QCF). It is studied at QCF Level 3 or 4, awarded over 2006 to 2018 and was for those new to teaching, or who wanted to start out as associate teachers, or who were teaching in the United Kingdom and required certification or qualification in the Further Education (FE) or Lifelong Learning sector of education. It has since been superseded by the Award in Education and Training qualification.

The PTLLS was the lowest of the teaching qualifications specifically for this sector of education, with others being the QCF Level 3/4 Certificate in Teaching in the Lifelong Learning Sector (CTLLS) and the QCF Level 5 Diploma in Teaching in the Lifelong Learning Sector (DTLLS) qualifications. Following successful completion, having achieved a pass, an Associate Teacher then had to take the more advanced CTLLS for the Certificate and after that the DTLLS for the Diploma.

To achieve the PTLLS certification, the learner/Associate Teacher/Trainer did not have to be in a teaching role in order to be assessed, making it a very achievable certification and a suitable starting point for anyone who wanted to become an educator. Assessment was in the form of a 'micro-teach' session and submission of assignments and portfolio of evidence. The Level 4 CTLLS, however, required the candidate to be in a teaching or training role in order to be assessed 'on-the-job', as well as through the submission of assignments and a portfolio of evidence.

The PTLLS was the first stage of a PGCE (Post Graduate Certificate in Education) in Lifelong learning and was required prior to achieving the CTLLS and DTLLS to gain Qualified Teacher Learning and Skills (QTLS) status. Between 2007 and 2013, it was a requirement that all FE teachers obtained the PTLLS award, or the equivalent, to be able to continue to teach in the further education sector in the UK.

The PTLLS was phased out over 2013 to 2018, along with the CTLLS and the DTLLS, and was replaced with the Award in Education and Training, Certificate in Education and Training and Diploma in Education and Training qualifications at RQF Level 3, 4 and 5, respectively from 2013.
