= AET =

AET may refer to:

- Academies Enterprise Trust, in the UK
- Actual Evapotranspiration, in climatology
- Administration for Technical Investigations (Administration des enquêtes techniques)
- Aerobic exercise training
- AET (company), a shipping company formerly known as American Eagle Tankers
- Aet (given name), an Estonian feminine given name
- Affective Events Theory, a model developed by organizational behaviorists to identify how emotions and moods influence job performance and satisfaction
- "After extra time", in sports, the score after overtime has finished
- All-electronic tolling
- Allakaket Airport in Alaska, US (IATA airport code AET)
- α-Ethyltryptamine, a psychoactive drug belonging to the tryptamine family
- American Educational Trust, a non-profit foundation
- Application Entity Title, in the DICOM medical imaging standard
- Assistant English Teacher, also called an Assistant Language Teacher
- Australian Eastern Time, a time zone in Australia
- Award in Education and Training, in UK education
- S-(2-aminoethyl)isothiuronium bromide hydrobromide
