= Certificate in Education and Training =

British teaching qualification

The Certificate in Education and Training is an initial teacher training qualification, studied at Regulated Qualifications Framework Level 4, for teaching in Further Education and the lifelong learning sector of education in the United Kingdom. Study for the Certificate in Education and Training typically follows the completion of the Award in Education and Training at Regulated Qualifications Framework Level 3, and precedes the start of the Diploma in Education and Training at Level 5. The Certificate in Education and Training qualifies an education practitioner for associate membership of the Society for Education and Training (previously, it qualified the holder for Associate Teacher Learning and Skills status from the former Institute for Learning). The Certificate in Education and Training replaces the Certificate in Teaching in the Lifelong Learning Sector. The Level 4 Certificate in Education and Training was developed as a qualification for Associate Teachers. The qualification does not itself entitle the holder to apply for Qualified Teacher Learning and Skills.
