= Buyer decision process =

Decision-making process used by consumers

As part of consumer behavior, the buying decision process is the decision-making process used by consumers regarding the market transactions before, during, and after the purchase of a good or service. It can be seen as a particular form of a cost–benefit analysis in the presence of multiple alternatives.

In consumer behavior, the buyer decision process refers to the series of steps consumers follow when making choices about purchasing goods or services, including activities before, during, and after the transaction.

Common examples include shopping and deciding what to eat. Decision-making is a psychological construct. This means that although a decision cannot be "seen", we can infer from observable behavior that a decision has been made. Therefore, we conclude that a psychological "decision-making" event has occurred. It is a construction that imputes a commitment to action. That is, based on observable actions, we assume that people have made a commitment to effect the action.

Nobel laureate Herbert A. Simon sees economic decision-making as a vain attempt to be rational. Simon claimed (in 1947 and 1957) that if a complete analysis is to be done, a decision will be immensely complex. Simon also wrote that peoples' information processing ability is limited. The assumption of a perfectly rational economic actor is unrealistic. Consumers are influenced by emotional and nonrational considerations making attempts to be rational only partially successful. He called for replacing the perfect rationality assumptions of homo economicus with a conception of rationality tailored to cognitively limited agents. Even if the buyer decision process was highly rational, the required product information and/or knowledge is often substantially limited in quality or extent, as is the availability of potential alternatives. Factors such as cognitive effort and decision-making time also play a role.

== Stages ==
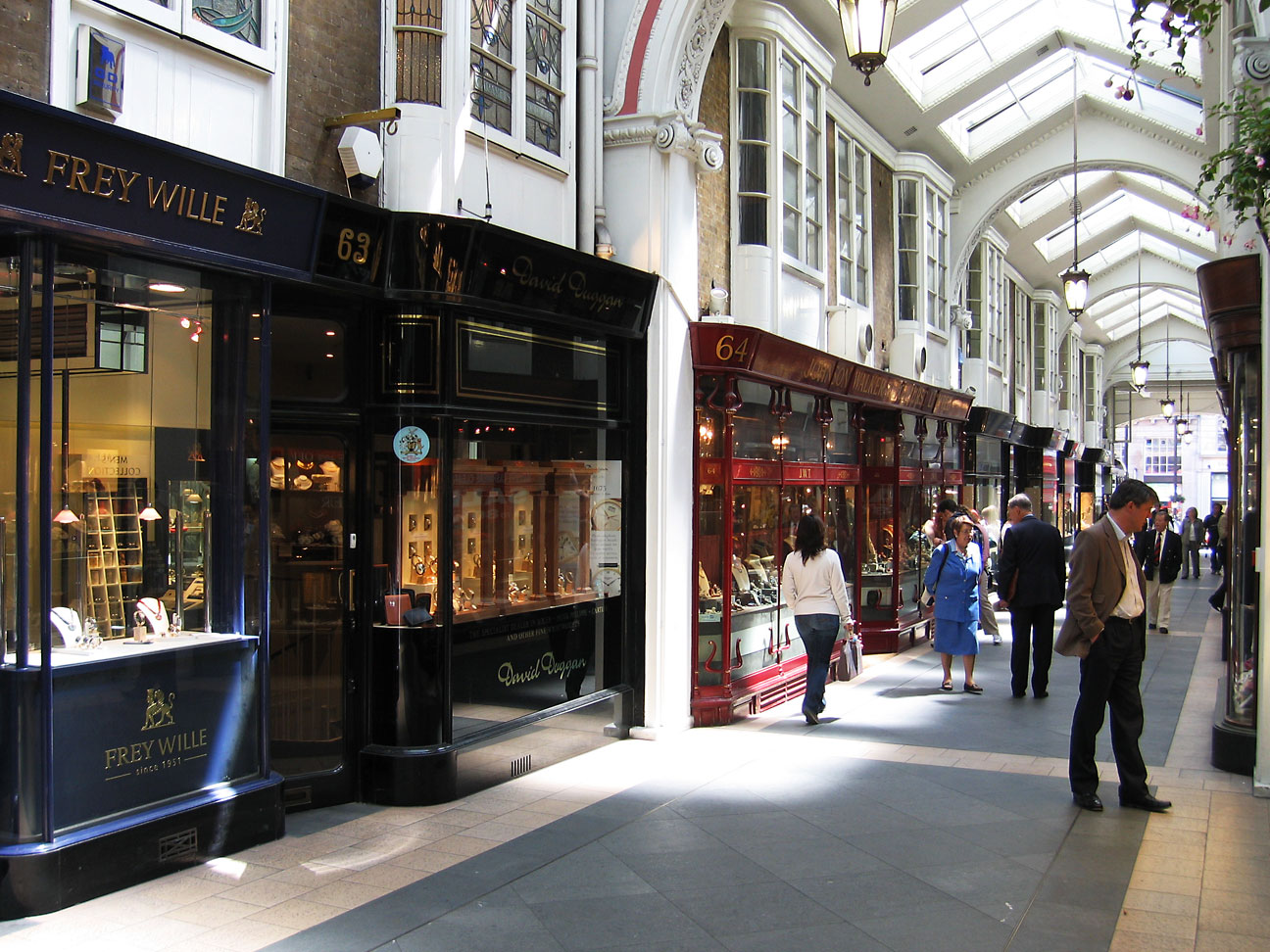
Consumers shopping at London's Burlington Arcade engage in a variety of recreational and functional purchasing activities – from window shopping through to transporting their purchases homewards.

The five stages of a decision process were first introduced by philosopher John Dewey in How We Think in 1910. Later studies expanded upon Dewey's initial work and are seen as foundational for analysis of consumer purchasing decision-making. Dewey did not refer in How We Think specifically to purchasing decisions, but in applied terms his five stages are:

- Problem/Need Recognition – recognize what the problem or need is and identify the product or type of product which is required. For example, a university student realizes their laptop has become too slow to run design software, prompting the need for a new, more powerful model.
- Information Search – the consumer researches the product which would satisfy the recognized need. Example: The student starts browsing tech review websites, comparing brands, and checking specifications and prices online.
- Evaluation of Alternatives – the consumer evaluates the searched alternatives. Generally, the information search reveals multiple products for the consumer to evaluate and understand which product would be appropriate. Example: They narrow choices down to three laptops, weighing trade-offs between price, features, and customer reviews.
- Purchase Decision – after the consumer may decide to purchase a product. This decision can be influenced by the opinions of others and by unforeseen circumstances. Example: The student decides to buy a mid-range model from a brand with strong support and warranty policies.
- Post Purchase Behavior – after the purchase, the consumer may experience post-purchase dissonance feeling that buying another product would have been better. Addressing post-purchase dissonance spreads the good word for the product and increases the chance of frequent repurchase. Example: After using the new laptop for a few weeks, the student shares their experience in an online review, expressing satisfaction or regret depending on performance.

These five stages are a framework to evaluate customers' buying decision process. While many consumers pass through these stages in a fixed, linear sequence, some stages such as evaluation of alternatives may occur throughout the purchase decision. The time and effort devoted to each stage depend on a number of factors including the perceived risk and the consumer's motivations. In the case of an impulse purchase, such as the purchase of a chocolate bar as a personal treat, the consumer may spend minimal time engaged in information search and evaluation and proceed directly to the actual purchase.

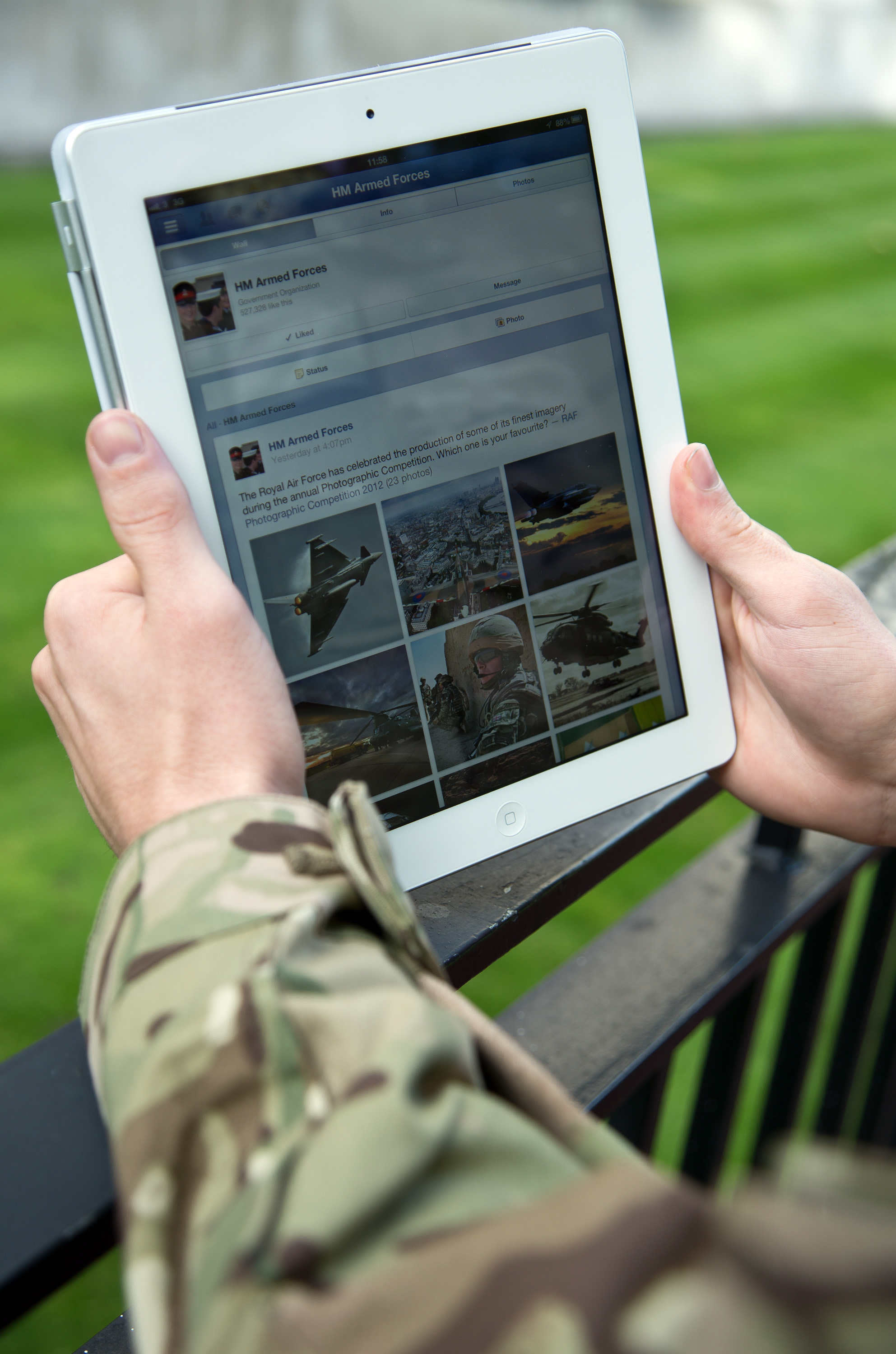
The rise of digital media and social networks is changing the way that consumers search for product information.

=== Problem/need-recognition ===
Problem/Need-recognition is the first step in the buying decision. Without knowing what the customer needs, they will not be enticed to purchase the product. The need can be triggered by internal stimuli (e.g. hunger, thirst) or external stimuli (e.g. advertising). Maslow held that needs are arranged in a hierarchy. According to Maslow's hierarchy, only when a person has fulfilled the needs at a certain stage, can he or she move to the next stage.

=== Information search ===
The information search stage is the pprocess by which consumers seek information about products or services that may satisfy a recognised need. Consumers may obtain information from personal, commercial, public and experiential sources, including recommendations, advertising, product reviews and direct experience. The extent of the search can vary depending on factors such as the consumer's level of involvement, perceived risk and familiarity with the product.

=== Evaluation of alternatives ===
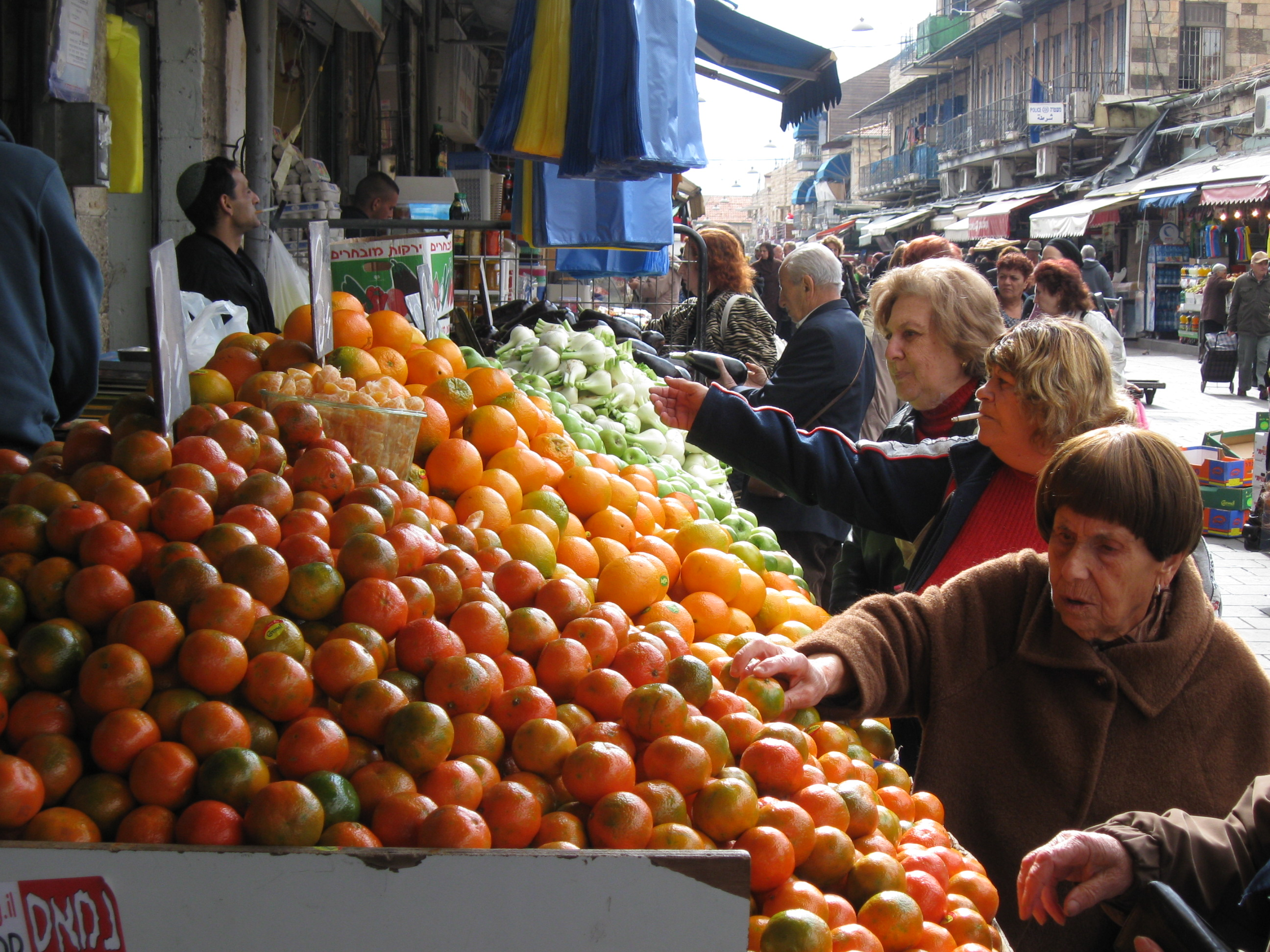
Shoppers inspect the quality of fresh produce at a market in Jerusalem.

At this stage, consumers evaluate different products/brands on the basis of varying product attributes, and whether these can deliver the benefits that the customers are seeking. This stage is heavily influenced by one's attitude, as "attitude puts one in a frame of mind: liking or disliking an object, moving towards or away from it". For example, in high-involvement purchases such as buying a car, consumers may compare numerous models, read reviews, and seek expert opinions; whereas for low-involvement purchases like toothpaste, they may rely on brand familiarity or promotional cues.

Customer involvement	High	Medium	Low
Characteristics	High	Medium	Low
Number of brands examined	Many	Several	Few
Number of sellers considered	Many	Several	Few
Number of product attributes evaluated	Many	Moderate	One
Number of external information sources used	Many	Few	None
Time spent searching	Considerable	Little	Minimal

=== Purchase decision ===
This is the fourth stage, where the purchase takes place. According to Kotler, Keller, Koshy, and Jha (2009), the final purchase decision can be disrupted by two factors: negative feedback from other customers and the level of motivation to comply or accept the feedback. For example, after going through the above three stages, a customer chooses to buy a Nikon D80 DSLR camera. However, because his good friend, who is also a photographer, gives him negative feedback, he will then be bound to change his preference. Secondly, the decision may be disrupted due to unanticipated situations such as a sudden job loss or the closing of a retail store.

=== Post-purchase behavior ===
These stages are important to keeping customers. Customers match products with their experiences on whether they are either content or discontent with the product. This affects the decision process for resemblant purchases from the same company in the future, mainly at the information search stage and evaluation of alternatives stage. If brand loyalty is made then customers will often fast-tracked or skip completely the information search and evaluation of alternative stages.

Either being content or discontent, a customer will spread good or bad opinions about the product. At this stage, companies try to make favorable post-purchase communication to encourage the customers to purchase.

Also, cognitive dissonance (consumer confusion in marketing terms) is common at this stage; customers often go through the feelings of post-purchase psychological tension or anxiety. Questions include: "Have I made the right decision?", "Is it a good choice?", etc.

== Models of buyer decision-making ==
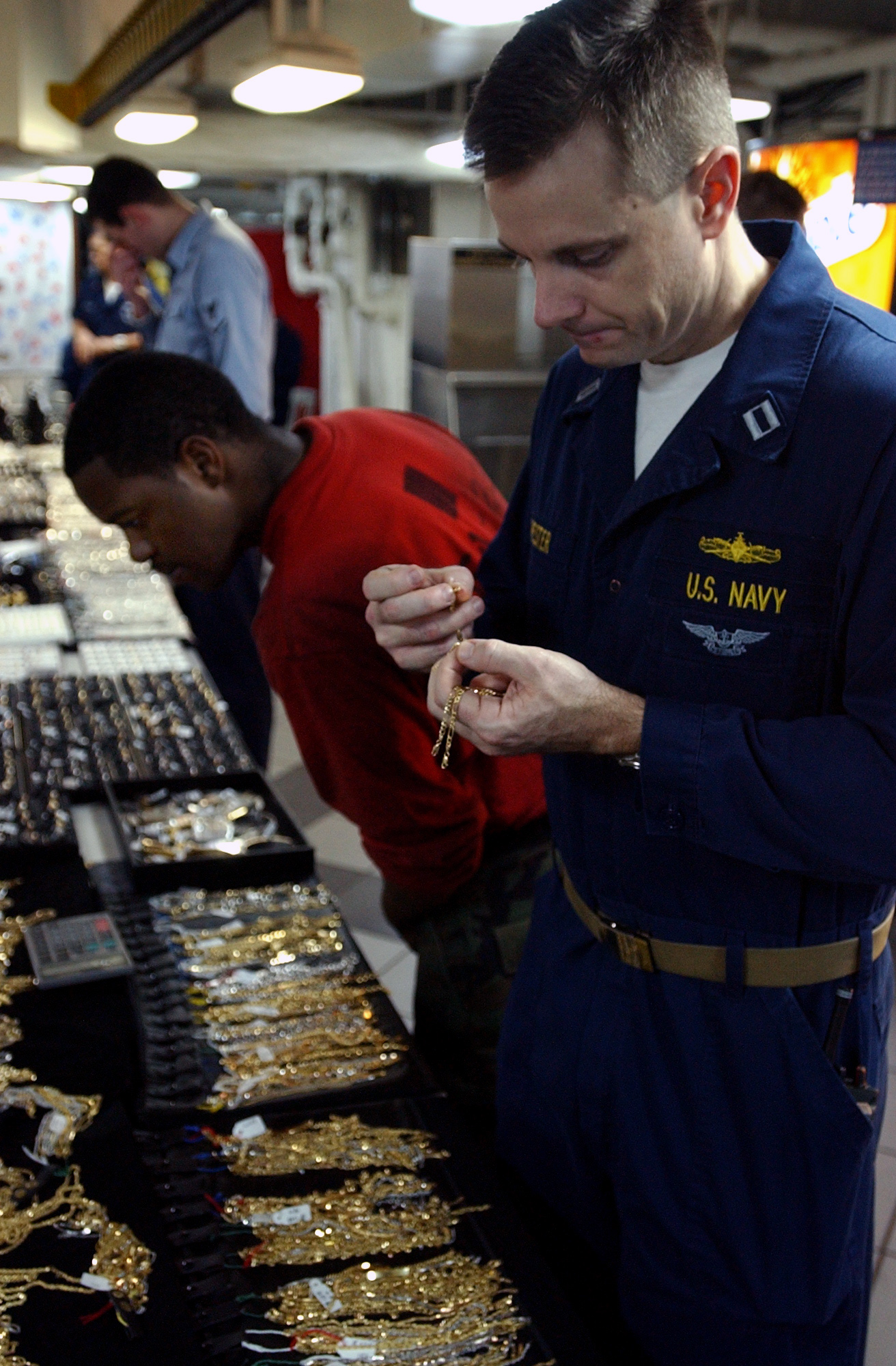
Making a few last minute decisions before purchasing a gold necklace from a Navy Exchange vendor

There are generally three ways of analyzing consumer buying decisions:

- Economic models – largely quantitative and are based on the assumptions of rationality and near perfect knowledge. The consumer is seen to maximize its utility. See consumer theory. Game theory can also be used in some circumstances.
- Psychological models – psychological and cognitive processes such as motivation and need recognition. They are qualitative rather than quantitative and build on sociological factors like cultural influences and family influences.
- Consumer behavior models – practical models used by marketers. They typically blend both economic and psychological models.

In an early study of the buyer decision process literature, Frank Nicosia (Nicosia, F. 1966; pp. 9–21) identified three types of buyer decision-making models. They are the univariate model (He called it the "simple scheme".) in which only one behavioral determinant was allowed in a stimulus-response type of relationship; the multi-variate model (He called it a "reduced form scheme".) in which numerous independent variables were assumed to determine buyer behavior; and finally the "system of equations" model (He called it a "structural scheme" or "process scheme".) in which numerous functional relations (either univariate or multivariate) interact in a complex system of equations. He concluded that only this third type of model is capable of expressing the complexity of buyer decision processes. In chapter 7, Nicosia builds a comprehensive model involving five modules. The encoding module includes determinants like "attributes of the brand", "environmental factors", "consumer's attributes", "attributes of the organization", and "attributes of the message". Other modules in the system include consumer decoding, search and evaluation, decision, and consumption.

In recent years, the rise of digital ecosystems has led to the development of the Online Consumer Decision Journey (OCDJ) model. This model highlights how digital touchpoints—such as social media, influencer content, and recommendation algorithms—disrupt the traditional linear decision-making path. For instance, McKinsey's Circular Decision Journey (2009) emphasizes that post-purchase experience feeds directly into future decision-making, forming a continuous loop rather than a straight line.

Some neuromarketing research papers examined how to approach motivation as indexed by electroencephalographic (EEG) asymmetry over the prefrontal cortex predicts purchase decision when brand and price are varied. In a within-subjects design, the participants have presented purchase decision trials with 14 different grocery products (seven private labels and seven national brand products) whose prices were increased and decreased while their EEG activity was recorded. The results showed that relatively greater left frontal activation (i.e., higher approach motivation) during the decision period predicted an affirmative purchase decision. The relationship of frontal EEG asymmetry with purchase decision was stronger for national brand products compared with private label products and when the price of a product was below a normal price (i.e., implicit reference price) compared with when it was above a normal price. The higher perceived need for a product and higher perceived product quality were associated with greater relative left frontal activation.

For any high-involvement product category, the decision-making time is normally long and buyers generally evaluate the information available very cautiously. They also utilize an active information search process. The risk associated with such a decision is very high.

== Neuroscience ==
Neuroscience is a useful tool and a source of theory development and testing in buyer decision-making research. Neuroimaging devices are used in Neuromarketing to investigate consumer behavior.

== See also ==
- Advertising management
- Brand
- Brand awareness
- Cognition
- Consumer behaviour
- Consumer choice
- Convenience technologies
- Cost–benefit analysis
- Group process
- Marketing management
- Product management
- Product life-cycle management (marketing)

== Bibliography ==
- Carlyn, Marcia. "An Assessment of the Myers-Briggs Type Indicator". Journal of Personality Assessment. 41.5 (1977): 461–73.
- Cheng, Many M., Peter F. Luckett, and Axel K. Schulz. "The Effects of Cognitive Style Diversity on Decision-Making Dyads: An Empirical Analysis in the Context of a Complex Task". Behavioral Research in Accounting. 15 (2003): 39–62.
- Gardner, William L., and Mark J. Martinko. "Using the Myers-Briggs Type Indicator to Study Managers: A Literature Review and Research Agenda". Journal of Management. 22.1 (1996): 45–83.
- Henderson, John C., and Paul C. Nutt. "Influence of Decision Style on Decision Making Behavior". Management Science. 26.4 (1980): 371–386.
- Kennedy, Bryan R., and Ashely D. Kennedy. "Using the Myers-Briggs Type Indicator in Career Counseling". Journal of Employment Counseling. 41.1 (2004): 38–44.
- Bettman, James R. (1979). "An Information Processing Theory of Consumer Choice". Addison-Wesley Educational Publishers.
- Yang, Haiyang and Ziv Carmon (2010). "Consumer Decision Making", in Jagdish Sheth & Naresh Malhotra (eds.), Wiley International Encyclopedia of Marketing, New York: Wiley.
- Myers, I. (1962). Introduction to Type: A description of the theory and applications of the Myers-Briggs type indicator, Consulting Psychologists Press, Palo Alto Ca., 1962.
- Nicosia, F. (1966). Consumer Decision Processes, Prentice Hall, Englewood Cliffs, 1966.
- Pittenger, David J. "The Utility of the Myers-Briggs Type Indicator". Review of Educational Research. 63:4 (1993): 467–488.
- Simon, H. (1947). Administrative behavior, Macmillan, New York, 1947 (also 2nd edition 1957).
- Volkema, Roger J., and Ronald H. Gorman. "The Influence of Cognitive-Based Group Composition on Decision-Making Process and Outcome". Journal of Management Studies. 35.1 (1998): 105–121.
