= Neal Ashkanasy =

Australian academic

Neal M. Ashkanasy
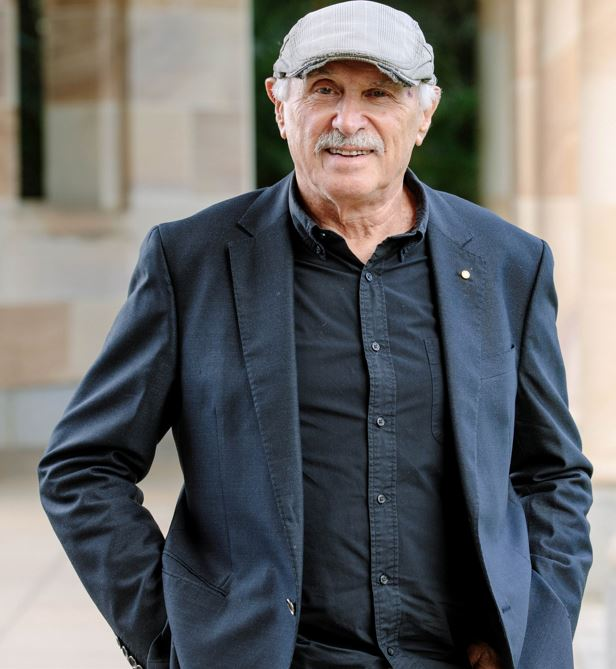
- Ashkanasy in 2022
- Born: 5 June 1945 (age 81); Melbourne, Australia
- Occupation: Professor of Management
- Known for: Emotions in the workplace
- Spouse: Linda Ashkanasy (married 1972)
- Children: 3
- Awards: Medal in the Order of Australia (OAM); Elton Mayo award for excellence in teaching and research Fellow of the Academy of the Social Sciences in Australia
- Website: www.business.uq.edu.au/staff/neal-ashkanasy

Neal M. Ashkanasy OAM (born 5 June 1945) is an Australian organizational psychologist and Emeritus Professor of Management at the University of Queensland Business School. He is known for his research on emotions in the workplace and organizational behaviour. He began his career as a civil engineer before transitioning to academia.

== Early life and education ==
Ashkanasy was born in Melbourne, Australia to Maurice Ashkanasy, an early leader of the Australian Jewish community, and Heather Helen Ashkanasy. He attended Mt. Scopus College and Monash University, where he completed a degree in Civil Engineering in 1966. In 1968, he completed a master's degree in Water Engineering at the University of New South Wales in Sydney, Australia.

Ashkanasy returned to university in 1970, where he completed a Graduate Diploma in Computer Science and a Bachelor of Arts (major in psychology) with First Class Honours and a University Medal, at the University of Queensland in Brisbane. He enrolled in a PhD in the UQ School of Psychology, which he completed in 1989.

== Career ==
Ashkanasy started work in Brisbane, Australia in 1968 with the Queensland Irrigation and Water Supply Commission and worked for the commission (renamed the QWRC: the Queensland Water Resources Commission) for 18 years. He began his career as a construction engineer on Fairbairn Dam in Central Queensland, returning to the Brisbane Office of the QWRC in 1970, rising to the rank of Executive Engineer, Water Supply Investigations. In this role, he oversaw hydrological investigations for the Wivenhoe Dam is on the Brisbane River in Australia. During that time, he was also actively involved in the Institution of Engineers, Australia, eventually serving as chair of its National Committee on Hydrology and Water Resources, during which time he oversaw production of the third edition of Australian Rainfall and Runoff. In 1975, he undertook a Churchill Fellowship world tour to study water resources development in the US, Europe, Israel, and India.

Commencing his academic career in 1986 with the School of Psychology, Ashkanasy was later seconded to the UQ Technology and Innovation Management Centre (1989). In 1988, he was appointed a Lecturer (Assistant Professor) in the UQ School of Commerce, where he attained tenure and promotion in 1994 before moving to the (former) School of Management in 1995. In 2002, the schools of Commerce and Management merged to form the UQ Business School. From 2004 to 2008, he served as Associate Dean (Research) of the Faculty of Business, Economics, and Law. His present position is Professor of Management in the UQ Business School. At the school, he has been the doctoral supervisor to many students who have gone on to significant academic careers, most notably Marie Dasborough (University of Miami) and Herman Tse (Monash University).

Ashkanasy is the founder of the "Emonet" (the Emotions network) and "Orgcult" (Organizational Culture) Listservs, which are sponsored by the Academy of Management. The Emonet group sponsors the biannual "International Conference on Emotions and Worklife" which has been running since 1998. The 10th "Emonet Conference" was held in Rome in July 2016.

In 2024, Ashkanasy was appointed as Emeritus Professor of Management at the University of Queensland Business School. His career and contributions to the field were recently commemorated in a retrospective titled "Leading With Heart: Neal Ashkanasy's Journey in Management Education." He is also an associate editor of the Journal of Management Education and Management Teaching Review.

== Research ==
Ashkanasy is a pioneer in the study of affective events theory and emotions in the workplace. He is best known for developing a multilevel conceptualization of emotions in organizations, which categorizes emotional experiences into five distinct levels:

1. Within-person (daily fluctuations in affect)
2. Individual differences (e.g., emotional intelligence)
3. Interpersonal (e.g., leader-member exchange)
4. Groups and teams (e.g., group emotional climate)
5. Organization-wide (e.g., organizational culture)

His work argues that emotions are not just "noise" in the workplace but are fundamental to understanding employee performance, leadership effectiveness, and organizational culture.

Additionally, Ashkanasy has conducted extensive research on Ethical decision-making, organizational culture, and the integration of neuroscience into management research.

== Publications ==
Ashkanasy has published over 300 journal articles and book chapters and is author or co-author of over 300 conference papers. His research interests include emotions in the workplace, leadership and leader-member relations, organizational and national culture, and ethics in organizational behavior.

According to Google Scholar, his work has been cited more than 45,000 times.

Ashkanasy served from 2007 to 2014 as editor-in-chief of the Journal of Organizational Behavior. From 2004 to 2008, he was associate editor of the Academy of Management Learning and Education. From 2011 to 2014, he served as associate editor of the Academy of Management Review. He is currently a member of the editorial board of Emotion Review (action editor) and book series editor of Research on Emotion in Organizations, published by Emerald Group Publishing.

== Awards and honours ==
Ashkanasy received a Medal of the Order of Australia (OAM) in 2017 "for service to tertiary education, to psychology, and to the community".

- Richard Whipp Lifetime Achievement Award, British Academy of Management (2024).
- David L. Bradford Outstanding Educator Award, Management & Organizational Behavior Teaching Society (2024).
- Outstanding Bridge Reviewer Mentor, Academy of Management Review (2024).
- Fellow of the Academy of Social Sciences.
- In 2019, Ashkanasy received the Distinguished Scholar Award from the Managerial and Organizational Cognition Division of the Academy of Management.
- Fellow of the Academy of the Social Sciences in Australia.
- Fellow of the Society for Industrial and Organizational Psychology.
- Fellow of the Association for Psychological Science.
- Life Fellow of the Australia and New Zealand Academy of Management.
- Fellow of the British Academy of Management.
- Fellow of the Southern Management Association.
- Awarded the Elton Mayo award for excellence in teaching and research by the Australian Psychological Society.
- Fellow of the Queensland Academy of Arts and Sciences (Council Member).
- Churchill Fellow in the field of water resource development.
