= Associate Teacher Learning and Skills =

Associate Teacher Learning and Skills (ATLS) status is a designation awarded to teachers in the Further Education and Post-Compulsory Education & Training sectors by the Education & Training Foundation (ETF) in the United Kingdom. ATLS may be earned en route to Qualified Teacher Learning and Skills (QTLS) status, which is seen as on an equal level to Qualified Teacher Status (QTS).

ATLS is a professional 'status'.

== Gaining ATLS ==
From November 2014, ATLS has been offered by the Education & Training Foundation (ETF) to members of the Society for Education & Training (SET) for a fee of £485. In order to obtain ATLS, the candidate is required to register with SET, undertake Continuing Professional Development (CPD) and complete SET's 'Professional Formation' process.

Prior to November 2014, ATLS was offered by the Institute for Learning (IfL) which was absorbed into the Education & Training Foundation (ETF) on 31 October 2014.

ATLS can be obtained en route to QTLS which is seen as on an equal level to QTS. Should an individual want to work as an Associate Teacher in maintained schools, the same way as any other teacher, then they must have ATLS and be a member of the Society for Education & Training (SET).

The Certificate in Education and Training qualification and its predecessors (e.g. CTLLS) qualify a teacher to attain ATLS.

== See also ==
- Qualified Teacher Learning and Skills (QTLS)
- Qualified Teacher Status (QTS)
