= MIFL =

- Maritime Intercollegiate Football League
- Motif-Index of Folk-Literature
- Muara International Fish Landing
- MIfL, Member of the Institute for Learning, a professional status of the institution
