= QTLS =

The acronym QTLS might refer to:

- Qualified Teacher Learning and Skills, an award for teachers
- quantitative trait locus, a section of DNA
