= Emotions in the workplace =

Component of workplace dynamics

Emotions in the workplace play a large role in how an entire organization communicates within itself and to the outside world. "Events at work have real emotional impact on participants. The consequences of emotional states in the workplace, both behaviors and attitudes, have substantial significance for individuals, groups, and society". "Positive emotions in the workplace help employees obtain favorable outcomes including achievement, job enrichment and higher quality social context". "Negative emotions, such as fear, anger, stress, hostility, sadness, and guilt, however increase the predictability of workplace deviance", and how the outside world views the organization.

"Emotions normally are associated with specific events or occurrences and are intense enough to disrupt thought processes.". Moods on the other hand, are more "generalized feelings or states that are not typically identified with a particular stimulus and not sufficiently intense to interrupt ongoing thought processes".

There can be many consequences for allowing negative emotions to affect your general attitude or mood at work. "Emotions and emotion management are a prominent feature of organizational life. It is crucial "to create a publicly observable and desirable emotional display as a part of a job role."

"The starting point for modern research on emotion in organizations seems to have been sociologist Arlie Russell Hochschild's (1983) seminal book on emotional labor: The Managed Heart". Ever since then the study of emotions in the workplace has been seen as a near science, with seminars being held on it and books being writing about it every year to help us understand the role it plays, especially via the Emonet website and Listserv, founded by Neal M. Ashkanasy in 1997.

== Positive ==
Positive emotions at work such as high achievement and excitement have "desirable effect independent of a person's relationships with others, including greater task activity, persistence, and enhanced cognitive function." "Strong positive emotions of emotionally intelligent people [include] optimism, positive mood, self-efficacy, and emotional resilience to persevere under adverse circumstances. ".

"Optimism rests on the premise that failure is not inherent in the individual; it may be attributed to circumstances that may be changed with a refocusing of effort." Those who express positive emotions in the workplace are better equipped to influence their coworkers favorably. "They are also more likable, and a halo effect may occur when warm or satisfied employees are rated favorably on other desirable attributes." It is likely that these people will inspire cooperation in others to carry out a task. It is said that "employees experience fewer positive emotions when interacting with their supervisors as compared with interactions with coworkers and customers."

Specific workers such as "service providers are expected to react to aggressive behaviors directed toward them with non-aggressive and even courteous behavior…also to engage in what has been termed emotional labor by demonstrating polite and pleasant manners regardless of the customer's behavior."

Being aware of whether or not you are showing positive emotions will cause ripple effects in the workplace. A manager or co-worker who displays positive emotions consistently is more likely to motivate those around him/her and have more opportunities within the company. Being able to bring out positive emotions and aware of how to do this can be an incredibly useful tool in the workplace. "Positive mood also elicits more exploration and enjoyment of new ideas and can enhance creativity" (Isen, 2000). A manager who is able to reward and speak to his employees in a way that brings out their positive emotions will be much more successful than one who lacks these skills.

== Emotional labor/ emotional work ==
"As the nature of the U.S. and global economies is increasingly transforming from manufacturing to service, organizational participants are coping with new challenges, and those challenges often involve complex processes of emotion in the workplace. The initial shift in the economy involved a move to customer service (including industries such as retailing, restaurants and the travel industry), leading to scholarly consideration of the way emotional communication is used in the service of customers and in the advancement of organizational goals. This type of work has come to be labeled as emotional labor...the emotions and displays in emotional labor are largely inauthentic and are seen by management as a commodity that can be controlled, trained and set down in employee handbooks." "This relates to the induction or suppression of feeling in order to sustain an outward appearance that produces a sense in others of being cared for in a convivial safe place.". Emotional labor refers to effort to show emotions that may not be genuinely felt but must be displayed in order to "express organizationally desired emotion during inter-personal transaction." "Commercialization of emotional labor and the trends towards the homogenization of industrial and service-sector labor processes have, in turn, been shaped by the adoption of new management practices designed to promote feeling rules and personal patterns of behavior that enhance the institutions or enterprises performance or competitive edge". In order to define the image that they want their organizations to portray, leaders use a "core component of "emotional intelligence" to recognize emotions.". that appear desirable. Organizations have begun using their employee's "emotion as a commodity used for the sake of profit".

Emotional labor inhibits workers from being able to participate in authentic emotional work. Emotional work is described as "emotion that is authentic, not emotion that is manufactured through surface acting…rarely seen as a profit center for management". "The person whose feelings are easily aroused (but not necessarily easily controlled) is going to have far more difficulty in dealing with emotionally stressful situations. In contrast, empathetic concern is hypothesized to have positive effects on responsiveness in international and on outcomes for the worker. A worker with empathetic concern will have feelings for the client but will be able to deal more effectively with the client's problems because there is not a direct sharing of the client's emotions". "Although emotional labor may be helpful to the organizational bottom line, there has been recent work suggesting that managing emotions for pay may be detrimental to the employee". Emotional labor and emotional work both have negative aspects to them including the feelings of stress, frustration or exhaustion that all lead to burnout. "Burnout is related to serious negative consequences such as deterioration in the quality of service, job turnover, absenteeism and low morale…[It] seems to be correlated with various self report indices of personal distress, including physical exhaustion, insomnia, increased use of alcohol and drugs and marital and family problems". Ironically, innovations that increase employee empowerment — such as conversion into worker cooperatives, co-managing schemes, or flattened workplace structures — have been found to increase workers’ levels of emotional labor as they take on more workplace responsibilities.

== Negative ==
Negative emotions at work can be formed by "work overload, lack of rewards, and social relations which appear to be the most stressful work-related factors". "Cynicism is a negative effective reaction to the organization. Cynics feel contempt, distress, shame, and even disgust when they reflect upon their organizations" (Abraham, 1999). Negative emotions are caused by "a range of workplace issues, including aggression, verbal abuse, sexual harassment, computer flaming, blogging, assertiveness training, grapevinxes, and non verbal behavior". "Stress is the problem of each person feeling it. [Negative emotions] can be caused by "poor leadership, lack of guidance, lack of support and backup. It can cause the performance of the employees to decrease causing the performance of the organization to decrease. Employees' lack of confidence in their abilities to deal with work demands… and their lack of confidence in coworkers… can also create prolonged negative stress". Showing stress reveals weakness, therefore, employees suppress their negative emotions at work and home. "People who continually inhibit their emotions have been found to be more prone to disease than those who are emotionally expressive". Negative emotions can be seen as a disease in the workplace. Those who exhibit it negatively affect those around them and can change the entire environment. A co-working might de-motivate those around them, a manager might cause his employees to feel contempt. Recognizing the negative emotions and learning how to handle them can be a tool for personal success as well as the success of your team. Managing your emotions in a way that does not show negativity will cause you to be seen more favorably in the workplace and can help with your personal productivity and development.

=== Consequences ===
Psychological and Emotional- "Individuals experiencing job insecurity have an increased risk for anxiety, depression, substance abuse, and somatic complaints". Marital and Family- Spouses and children can feel the crossover effects of burnout brought home from the workplace. Depleted levels of energy which effect home management is another consequence. Organizational- Negative feelings at work effect "employee moral, turnover rate, commitment to the organization".

Not being able to control personal emotions and recognize emotional cues in others can be disastrous in the workplace. It can cause conflict between you and others, or simply cause you to be seen in a negative light and result in missed opportunities.

Over half of executives report anxiety and panic attacks, three quarters experience depression, and more than a third use recreational drugs weekly to cope with work stress.

Not having a strong base to things like drama and gossip can also disrupt a functioning business. Lisa McQuerrey gives a definition for drama: "Drama is usually defined as spreading unverified information, discussing personal matters at work, antagonizing colleagues or blowing minor issues out of proportion to get attention." McQuerry wrote an article giving solutions to stop drama and conflict between coworkers. There are eight important solutions to ending conflict in a workplace according to McQuerrey, first being to set a policy in an employee handbook making drama unacceptable. With this, there needs to be a list of consequences. Second being that the roles of employees need to be clarified. Other examples in her article include: Stopping gossip before it makes its rounds, confronting employees about changes at work yourself instead of having a rumor mill, report drama if there is a regular instigator. McQuerrey goes on with saying that if situations go on, there should be a meeting held where management mediates the people who gossip. It is also important to follow up with your policy and give warnings about the consequences. Employees may be unaware of how their actions impact their coworkers, bringing in a behavioral expert into your business is usually a positive reinforcement when there's nothing else you can do.

== Works cited ==
- Abraham, Rebecca. (1999). Emotional Intelligence in Organizations: A Conceptualization. Genetic, Social, and General Psychology Monographs, 125(2), 209–224. Retrieved from PsycINFO database.
- Anand, N., Ginka Toegel, and Martin Kilduff. (2007). Emotion Helpers: The Role of High Positive Affectivity and High Self-Monitoring Managers. Personnel Psychology, 60(2), 337–365. Retrieved from PsycINFO database.
- Ben-Zur, H. and Yagil, D. (2005). The relationship between empowerment, aggressive behaviours of customers, coping, and burnout. European Journal of Work and Organizational Psychology, 14(1) 81–99. Retrieved from PsycINFO database.
- Bono, Joyce E, Hannah Jackson Foldes, Gregory Vinson, and John P. Muros. (2007). Workplace Emotions: The Role of Supervision and Leadership. Journal of Applied Psychology, 92(5), 1357–1367. Retrieved from PsycINFO database.
- Brescoll, V.L. and Uhlmann, E.L. (2008). Can an angry woman get ahead? : Status conferral, gender, and expression of emotion in the workplace. Association for Psychological Science, 19(3) 268–275. Retrieved from PsycINFO database.
- Brief, Arthur P., and Howard M. Weiss. (2002). Organizational Behavior: Affect in the Workplace. Annu. Rev. Psychol. 53, 279–307. Retrieved from PsycINFO database.
- Canaff, Audrey L., and Wanda Wright. (2004). High Anxiety: Counseling the Job- Insecure Client. Journal of Employment Counseling, 41(1), 2-10. Retrieved from PsycINFO database.
- Elfenbein, H.A. and Ambady, N. (2002). Predicting workplace outcomes from the ability to eavesdrop on feelings. Journal of Applied Psychology, 87 (5) 963–971. Retrieved from PsycINFO database.
- Fong, Christina C., and Larissa Z. Tiedens. (2002). Dueling Experiences and Dual Ambivalences: Emotional and Motivational Ambivalence of Women in High Status Positions. Motivation and Emotion, 26(1), 105–121. Retrieved from PsycINFO database.
- Grandey, A. A. (2000). Emotion regulation in the workplace: A new way to conceptualize emotional labor. Journal of Occupational Health Psychology, 5(1), 95-110. Retrieved from PsycINFO database.
- Lee, Kibeom, & Allen, Natalie J. (2002). Organizational Citizenship Behavior and Workplace Deviance: The Role of Affect and Cognitions. Journal of Applied Psychology, 87(1), 131–142. Retrieved from PsychoINFO database.
- Mann, S. (1999). Emotion at work: to what extent are we expressing, suppressing, or faking it? European Journal of Work and Organizational Psychology, 8(3) 347–369. Retrieved from PsycINFO database.
- Martin, Dick. (2012). OtherWise: The Wisdom You Need to Succeed in a Diverse World Organization. Published by AMACOM Books, a division of American Management Association, 1601 Broadway, New York, NY 10019.
- Miller, Katherine. (2007). Compassionate Communication in the Workplace: Exploring Processes of Noticing, Connecting, and Responding. Journal of Applied Communication Research, 35(3), 223–245. Retrieved from PsychoINFO database.
- Miller, Kathrine, & Koesten, Joy. (2008). Financial Feeling: An Investigation of Emotion and Communication in the Workplace. Journal of Applied Communication Research, 36(1), 8-32. Retrieved from PsycINFO database.
- Muir, Clive. (2006). Emotions At Work. Business Communication Quarterly, 69(4). Retrieved from PsychoINFO database.
- Oginska-Bulik, Nina. (2005). Emotional Intelligence in the Workplace: Exploring its Effects on Occupational Stress and Health Outcomes in Human Service Workers. International Journal of Occupational Medicine & Environmental Health, 28(2), 167–175. Retrieved from PsychoINFO database.
- Olofsson, B., Bengtsson, C., Brink, E. (2003). Absence of response: a study of nurses' experience of stress in the workplace. Journal of Nursing Management, 11, 351–358. Retrieved from PsycINFO database.
- Poynter, Gavin. (2002). Emotions in the Labour Process. European Journal of Psychotherapy, Counseling and Health, 5(3), 247–261. Retrieved from PsycINFO database.
- Staw, B.M., Sutton, R. S., Pelled, L.H. (1994). Employee positive emotion and favorable outcomes at the workplace. Organization Science, 5(1) 51–70. Retrieved from PsycINFO database.
- Weiss, Howard. (2002). Introductory comments: Antecedents of Emotional Experiences at Work. Motivation and Emotion, 26(1), 1–2. Retrieved from PsychoINFO database.
- Pearson, Christine M. "The Smart Way to Respond to Negative Emotions at Work". MIT Sloan Management Review. Retrieved 2018-12-10.
- Seaton, Cherisse L.; Bottorff, Joan L.; Jones-Bricker, Margaret; Lamont, Sonia (2018-10-18). "The Role of Positive Emotion and Ego-Resilience in Determining Men's Physical Activity Following a Workplace Health Intervention". American Journal of Men's Health. 12 (6): 1916–1928. doi:10.1177/1557988318803744. ISSN 1557-9883. PMC 6199438. PMID 30334492.
- Mérida-López, Sergio; Extremera, Natalio; Quintana-Orts, Cirenia; Rey, Lourdes (2018-09-21). "In pursuit of job satisfaction and happiness: Testing the interactive contribution of emotion-regulation ability and workplace social support". Scandinavian Journal of Psychology. doi:10.1111/sjop.12483. ISSN 0036-5564.
- Balducci, Cristian (2012)."Exploring the relationship between workaholism and workplace aggressive behaviour: The role of job-related emotion." Personality and individual differences. 53: 629–634.
- Hochschild, Arlie Russell (1983). The Managed Heart: Commercialization of Human Feeling. University of California Press. ISBN 0520054547.
