= Journal of Organizational Behavior =

- Discipline: Organizational behavior
- Language: English
- Edited by: Laurie Barclay

Publication details
- Former name: Journal of Occupational Behaviour
- History: 1980–present
- Publisher: John Wiley & Sons
- Frequency: 8/year
- Impact factor: 9.0 (2025)

Standard abbreviations
- ISO 4: J. Organ. Behav.

Indexing
- CODEN: JORBEJ
- ISSN: 0894-3796 (print); 1099-1379 (web)
- LCCN: 88648174
- OCLC no.: 66937523

Links
- Journal homepage; Online access; Online archive

The Journal of Organizational Behavior is a peer-reviewed academic journal published eight times a year by Wiley-Blackwell. The journal publishes empirical reports and theoretical reviews spanning the spectrum of organizational behavior research. It was established in 1980 as the Journal of Occupational Behaviour, obtaining its current title in 1988. The founding editor-in-chief was Cary Cooper (Manchester Business School), who was succeeded by Neal Ashkanasy (UQ Business School). The current editor-in-chief is Laurie Barclay (University of Guelph).

== Abstracting and indexing ==
The journal is abstracted and indexed in the Social Sciences Citation Index, Scopus, ProQuest, Cambridge Scientific Abstracts, EBSCO databases, and Emerald Management Reviews. According to the Journal Citation Reports, it has a 2025 impact factor of 6.8.

== Best dissertation-based paper ==
The journal sponsors the Academy of Management's Organizational Behavior Division's annual "Best Dissertation-Based Paper" prize, which recognizes one paper, based on a dissertation, which makes a significant contribution to the OB discipline.

== International Review of Industrial and Organizational Psychology ==
In 2012, it was announced that the International Review of Industrial and Organizational Psychology would be published as an annual review issue of the Journal of Organizational Behavior. This issue will be co-edited by Gerard P. Hodgkinson (Warwick Business School) and J. Kevin Ford (Michigan State University).

== See also ==
- Industrial and organizational psychology
