= Award in Education and Training =

British teaching qualification

The Award in Education and Training is an initial teacher training qualification, studied at QCF Level 3, for teaching in Further Education (FE) and the lifelong learning sector of education in the United Kingdom. Study for the Award in Education and Training typically precedes the completion of the Certificate in Education and Training at QCF Level 4 and the Diploma in Education and Training at QCF Level 5. The Award in Education and Training replaces the Preparing to Teach in the Lifelong Learning Sector.
