= Maurice Ashkanasy =

Australian barrister

Maurice Ashkanasy CMG (3 October 1901 – 2 April 1971) was an Australian barrister and Jewish community leader.

Ashkanasy was born Moshe Ashckinasy at Mile End Old Town in London to Palestinian-born tailor's cutter Solomon Ashckinasy and Annie, née Cohen, who was born in Russia. They emigrated to Australia in 1910 and lived in Melbourne, where Solomon worked as a scholar and Annie sold clothes. Maurice attended state schools including Melbourne High School before studying law at the University of Melbourne, receiving a Bachelor of Law in 1923 and a Master of Law in 1924. Admitted to the bar in 1924 having read with his lifelong friend Robert Menzies, he took silk in 1940. He married Heather Helen Epstein at East Melbourne Synagogue on 29 June 1927.

Ashkanasy was transferred to the Australian Imperial Force from the Reserve on 2 July 1940 as a lieutenant and embarked on 3 February 1941 for Singapore with the 8th Division. He was the deputy adjutant-general and legal officer for the AIF in Malaya and in October was promoted major. Following the fall of Singapore in February 1942, Ashkanasy led a small group in an audacious escape, ultimately reaching Fremantle in Western Australia via the Netherlands East Indies. Now a lieutenant colonel, Ashkanasy served in New Guinea and was mentioned in dispatches. He retired from active duty in September 1944 and returned to the reserve in February 1945 as an honorary colonel.

Returning to the Bar, Ashkanasy was elected vice-chairman of the Victorian Bar Council in March 1952 and served as chairman from 1953 to 1956. He was instrumental in the construction of the Owen Dixon Chambers and was chairman of the Victorian section of the International Commission of Jurists, of which he was also Australian vice-president. A member of the Labor Party, Ashkanasy twice contested federal elections unsuccessfully, in 1946 (for the seat of Balaclava) and 1958 (for the Senate). Prior to the 1961 election Ashkanasy lost an acrimonious ALP Senate preselection contest to Sam Cohen, who became the first Jew elected to the Senate. Ashkanasy was aligned with the Labor Right faction and Cohen with the Labor Left faction.

Ashkanasy was also a leader in the Australian Jewish community and had been one of the founders of the Judaean League, a Jewish youth group. He was the founding president of the Victorian Jewish Board of Deputies in 1947 and served five times as president of the Executive Council of Australian Jewry. Ashkanasy was appointed Companion of the Order of St Michael and St George in 1961. He died at Frankston of heart disease in 1971 and was buried in Springvale Cemetery; he is commemorated with a national Jewish award.

== Personal ==
Ashkanasy had three children; Vivianne de Vahl Davis, Neville Ashkanasy and Neal Ashkanasy.
