= Diploma in Education and Training =

British teaching qualification

The Diploma in Education and Training is an initial teacher training qualification, studied at RQF Level 5, for teaching in Further Education (FE) and the lifelong learning sector of education in the United Kingdom. Study for the Diploma in Education and Training typically follows the completion of the Certificate in Education and Training at RQF Level 4 and the Award in Education and Training at RQF Level 3. The Diploma in Education and Training qualifies a teacher for Qualified Teacher Learning and Skills (QTLS) status from the Society for Education and Training (previously this was awarded by the Institute for Learning). The Diploma in Education and Training replaces the Diploma in Teaching in the Lifelong Learning Sector. The Diploma in Education and Training is an industry standard qualification for those teaching in the post-16 sector.

== Scope of the DET qualification ==
With this common teacher training qualification, candidate can teach in diverse fields such as the Culinary Arts, Engineering, Music Teaching, Performing Arts, Hospitality & Catering, NHS training, Personal Services, Teacher Training, Freelance Teaching and Training, and many more areas. There are some practical requirements to take this course which vary from awarding body to awarding body, but involve 100 hours of teaching.

In addition to equipping you with the abilities to instruct in settings like adult education, community programs, or workplace training, the Level 5 Diploma in Education and Training offers the opportunity to pursue Qualified Teacher Learning Status (QTLS). Comparable to Qualified Teacher Status (QTS), QTLS enables you to engage in teaching within school environments. However, obtaining both the Level 5 DET and QTLS is a prerequisite for this pathway.

The Level 5 Diploma in Education and Training has recently been replaced by the Level 5 Diploma in Teaching.

== Progression ==
Successful completion of this teaching certificate online enables employment in a state school as teacher of the 14+ age-range. Learners wishing to progress from this qualification can also undertake the following qualifications.

- Level 6 Diploma in Teaching and Learning
- Level 7 Diploma in Education Management and Leadership
