= Diploma in Teaching in the Lifelong Learning Sector =

British teaching qualification

The Diploma in Teaching in the Lifelong Learning Sector (DTLLS) was an initial teacher training qualification, studied at QCF Level 5 or 7, for teaching in Further Education (FE) and the lifelong learning sector of education in the United Kingdom. The DTLLS was the highest of the teaching qualifications specifically for this sector of education, the others being the Certificate in Teaching in the Lifelong Learning Sector (CTLLS) and the Preparing to Teach in the Lifelong Learning Sector (PTLLS) qualifications. The DTLLS at QCF Level 7 was equivalent to a Post-Graduate Certificate in Education in Lifelong Learning or Post-Compulsory Education and Training (PCET). The DTLLS was phased out along with the CTLLS and the PTLLS, and replaced with the Diploma in Education and Training qualification at QCF Level 5. The framework for such qualification has been changed to (RQF) Regulated Qualification Framework. There are also different routes to be a qualified teacher in UK. The Level 5 Diploma in Teaching replaces the Level 5 Diploma in Education and Training.

== Useful Knowledge/skills that you will Learn With DET ==
You will be able to:

- Understand your roles and responsibilities as a tutor such as planning and delivering inclusive teaching and learning, etc.
- Apply theories and models of reflection and evaluation to the evaluation of your own practice in planning, delivering and assessing inclusive teaching and learning.
- Understand professionalism and the influence of professional values in education and training.
- Contribute to the quality improvement and quality assurance arrangements of an organisation.
- Understand the importance of promoting equality and valuing diversity in lifelong learning.
- Manage information relevant to the internal quality assurance of assessment.
- Maintain legal and good practice requirements when internally monitoring and maintaining the quality of assessment.
- This diploma in education and teaching will help you gain theoretical and practical knowledge regarding how to become a qualified teacher.
