= Convenience technologies =

Convenience technologies enable viewers and users of television, Internet, mobile devices, Digital Video Recorders (DVR), Video on Demand (VOD) and Digital Versatile Disc (DVD) to more easily seek out specific content and view it in individualized patterns. These technologies increase viewers’ ability to choose when they want to watch a program with the use of DVR, VOD and DVD, and where to watch a program with the use of DVD, iPOD, TiVo ToGo and mobile phones. These technological enhancers provide the most comprehensive and varied adjustments in the technological potential of the medium (Amanda D. Lotz, 2007, p. 59).

Convenience Technologies encourage active selection instead of generally watching what “comes on next” or “is on”. Because of this, consequently, viewers focused more on programs they wanted to watch than on the networks that supplied them (Lotz, 2007, p. 59)

The main problem for networks is that the DVR using audience appears, by basically every measure that's vital to advertisers, more wanted than the non-DVR crowds. According to a Horizon Media Study, early adopters of technology are usually above the national average in income, in a “well-off” set. They are typically college graduates and white-collar workers (Lowry, 2010).
