= Certificate in Teaching in the Lifelong Learning Sector =

British teaching qualification

The Qualifications and Credit Framework (QCF) Level 3/4 Certificate in Teaching in the Lifelong Learning Sector (CTLLS) is an initial teacher training qualification, that was studied at QCF Level 3 or 4, for teaching in Further Education (FE) and the lifelong learning sector of education in the United Kingdom.

The CTLLS was the second highest of the teaching qualifications specifically for this sector of education, the others being the Diploma in Teaching in the Lifelong Learning Sector (DTLLS) and the Preparing to Teach in the Lifelong Learning Sector (PTLLS) qualifications. All of these were introduced in 2007 and later updated in 2011.

The QCF Level 4 Certificate in Teaching in the Lifelong Learning Sector qualification (CTLLS) was replaced with the Level 4 Certificate in Education and Training qualification. There are also some practical requirements for both CTLLS and DTLLS courses.
