= S-(2-Aminoethyl)isothiuronium bromide hydrobromide =

Names
- IUPAC name 2-aminoethyl carbamimidothioate;dihydrobromide
- Other names beta-Aminoethylisothiuronium bromide; beta-Aminoethyl isothiourea; 2-(2-Aminoethyl)-2-thiopseudourea dihydrobromide; AET; AI3-23427; Antirad; Antiradon; Ixecur; Pseudourea, (2-aminoethyl)-2-thio-, dihydrobromide; S-(2-Aminoaethyl)isothiuronium dibromid; S-(2-Aminoethyl)isothiuronium dibromide; S-(2-Aminoethyl)pseudothiourea dihydrobromide; S-2-Aminoethylisothiouronium bromide hydrobromide; Surrectan;

Identifiers
CAS Number	56-10-0
3D model (JSmol)	Interactive image
ChEMBL	ChEMBL1256182
ChemSpider	5727
ECHA InfoCard	100.000.234
EC Number	200-257-0
KEGG	D88373
PubChem CID	5940
UNII	03K18418PY
CompTox Dashboard (EPA)	DTXSID1058765
- InChI: InChI=1S/C3H9N3S.2BrH/c4-1-2-7-3(5)6;;/h1-2,4H2,(H3,5,6);2*1H Key: XDVMCVGTDUKDHL-UHFFFAOYSA-N
- SMILES: C(CSC(=N)N)N.Br.Br

Properties
Chemical formula	C_{3}H_{11}Br_{2}N_{3}S
Molar mass	281.015 g/mol

Hazards
- GHS labelling
Pictograms	(GHS07: Exclamation mark)
Signal word	Warning
Hazard statements	H302, H315, H319, H335
Precautionary statements	P261, P264, P264+P265, P270, P271, P280, P301+P317, P302+P352, P304+P340, P305+P351+P338, P319, P321, P330, P332+P317, P337+P317, P362+P364, P403+P233, P405, P501
- Except where otherwise noted, data are given for materials in their standard state (at 25 °C [77 °F], 100 kPa). Infobox references

S-(2-Aminoethyl)isothiourea dihydrobromide, commonly known as AET, is a isothiouronium-group-containing reducing agent with textbook uses as a disulfide reducing agent. Though it does not have a free thiol group (-SH) like 2-mercaptoethanol and dithiothreitol (DTT), it reacts with water to decompose transiently into thiol intermediates that acts on disulfide in a manner to these containing free -SH groups.

== Applications ==
One application of AET is in hematology where red cells are treated with AET to create PNH-like cells.
