= Qualified Teacher Learning and Skills =

Qualified Teacher Learning and Skills (QTLS) status is a designation awarded to teachers in the Further Education and Post-Compulsory Education & Training sectors by the Education & Training Foundation (ETF) in the United Kingdom.

Since 1 April 2012, teachers with Qualified Teacher Learning and Skills (QTLS) status have also been recognised as qualified to teach in schools.

Holders of QTLS who are members of the Society for Education & Training (SET) may be appointed to permanent positions as qualified teachers, without any further induction requirements.

QTLS is therefore recognised as equivalent to QTS.

== Gaining and Maintaining QTLS ==
From November 2014, QTLS has been offered by the Education & Training Foundation (ETF) to members of the Society for Education & Training (SET) for a fee of £490. In order to obtain QTLS, the candidate is required to register with SET, undertake annual Continuing Professional Development (CPD) and complete SET's 'Professional Formation' process.

Prior to November 2014, QTLS was offered by the Institute for Learning (IfL) which was absorbed into the Education & Training Foundation (ETF) on 31 October 2014.

QTLS is equivalent to QTS. Should an individual want to teach in maintained schools, the same way as any other teacher, then they must hold QTLS, currently be, and remain a member of the Society for Education & Training (SET). There are some common routes to achieving a Qualified Teacher in Learning Skills (QTLS) or Qualified Teacher Status (QTS).

The PGCE in Post-Compulsory Education & Training and the Diploma in Education and Training (including its predecessors, e.g. DTLLS) are the qualifications which qualify a teacher to attain QTLS.

== See also ==
- Associate Teacher Learning and Skills (ATLS)
- Qualified Teacher Status (QTS)
