= University of Queensland Business School =

Business school in Brisbane

UQ Business School
- Established: 2002
- Affiliations: University of Queensland, Group of Eight, Universitas 21, ASAIHL
- Academic staff: 150+
- Students: 7,500+
- Location: Brisbane, Queensland, Australia; 27.4947°S 153.0142°E
- Website: www.business.uq.edu.au

The University of Queensland Business School (or UQ Business School) is the business school of the University of Queensland, located in Brisbane, Australia. There are seven areas of research expertise across UQ Business School: Accounting, Business Information Systems, Finance, Management, Marketing, Strategy and Tourism.

The school began teaching its MBA program in 1972, the very first to be offered in Queensland. It became the first business school in Australia to meet the standards of the accrediting bodies – the US-based AACSB International and Europe's EQUIS.

The Economist has ranked UQ Business School as 1st worldwide for student quality, the UQ Business School MBA program also ranked 1st in Queensland and 3rd overall in Australia in 2021.

In addition, along with Faculty of Business, Economics & Law, UQ Business School collaborates with Mahidol University International College and The Chinese University of Hong Kong to introduce Hospitality Management Program, exclusively available to its Bachelor of International and Tourism Management students.

== History ==
UQ Business School's origins date back to 1926 when the University of Queensland first began to offer accounting degrees. The Department of Accountancy was set up in 1961, and later became the School of Commerce. Management education began in 1972, when the first MBA students enrolled.

The school was renamed the Department of Business Administration and later became School of Management in 1984.

UQ Business School was formed in 2002 with the merger of the Schools of Commerce and Management, and two years later it expanded further when it merged with the Technology and Innovation Management Centre (TIMC).

UQ Business School was the first business school in Australia to gain dual accreditation from AACSB International and EQUIS – the most prestigious standards a business school can achieve.

== Campuses ==
UQ Business School operates over two sites. Most of the school's staff are located at the St Lucia campus, a 114-acre site located seven miles from the centre of Brisbane within a bend in the Brisbane River.

UQ Business School Brisbane City (UQ Brisbane City), which opened in 2004, is situated in Brisbane's central business district and is home to the school's MBA program and Executive Education courses. This learning and conference centre won the Queensland Architecture Award (Interiors) in 2005.

== Rankings and awards ==
- 5th ranked MBA program in Asia-Pacific in The Economist 2021 Full-time MBA ranking
- 47th ranked MBA program in the world in The Economist 2021 Full-time MBA ranking
- 8th ranked MBA business school in Australia in the Financial Review Boss 2019
- GMAA Five Star rating of MBA program for the ninth consecutive year
- The Australian Research Council's ERA (The Excellence in Research for Australia) rated UQ Business School's research above or well above world standard in all categories (banking, finance, investment, business and management)
- 47th ranked business school in the world in the Financial Times executive education open 2011
- Martie-Louise Verreynne, Stewart Gow and Clint Ramsay, awarded by the Australian Teaching and Learning Council (ATLC)
