= Journal of Employment Counseling =

- Discipline: Psychotherapy & Counseling
- Language: English
- Edited by: Mark Rehfuss, PhD

Publication details
- History: 1964–present
- Publisher: Wiley-Blackwell on behalf of the American Counseling Association (United States)
- Frequency: Quarterly

Standard abbreviations
- ISO 4: J. Employ. Couns.

Indexing
- ISSN: 0022-0787 (print); 2161-1920 (web)

Links
- Journal homepage; Online access; Online archive

Journal of Employment Counseling is a quarterly peer-reviewed academic journal published by Wiley-Blackwell on behalf of the American Counseling Association and the National Employment Counseling Association. The journal was established in 1964. Its current editor-in-chief is Mark Rehfuss, PhD. The journal focuses on theory and practice in employment counseling, professional experimentation and research, and current client vocational problems as well as the professional concerns of counselors.

According to the Journal Citation Reports, the journal has a 2012 impact factor of 0.279, ranking it 69th out of 72 journals in the category "Psychology Applied".
