= Affective events theory =

Psychological model

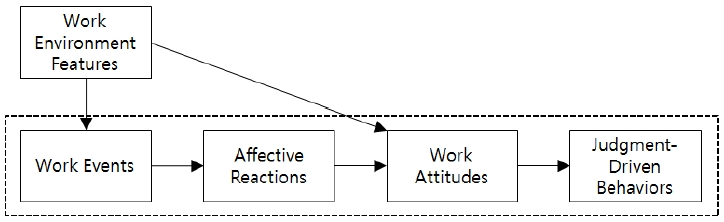
Affective events theory model

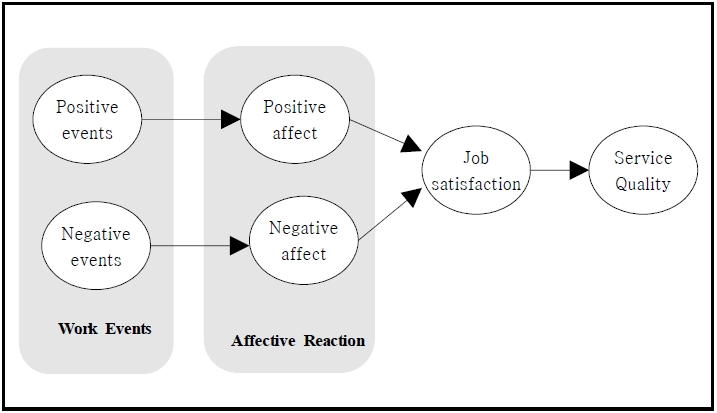
Research model

Affective events theory (AET) is an industrial and organizational psychology model developed by organizational psychologists Howard M. Weiss (Georgia Institute of Technology) and Russell Cropanzano (University of Colorado) to explain how emotions and moods influence job performance and job satisfaction. The model explains the linkages between employees' internal influences (e.g., cognitions, emotions, mental states) and their reactions to incidents that occur in their work environment that affect their performance, organizational commitment, and job satisfaction. The theory proposes that affective work behaviors are explained by employee mood and emotions, while cognitive-based behaviors are the best predictors of job satisfaction. The theory proposes that positive-inducing (e.g., uplifts) as well as negative-inducing (e.g., hassles) emotional incidents at work are distinguishable and have a significant psychological impact upon workers' job satisfaction. This results in lasting internal (e.g., cognition, emotions, mental states) and external affective reactions exhibited through job performance, job satisfaction, and organizational commitment.

Alternatively, some research suggests that job satisfaction mediates the relationship between various antecedent variables such as dispositions, workplace events, job characteristics, job opportunities, and employee behavior exhibited while on the job (e.g., organizational citizenship behaviors, counter-productive work behaviors, and job withdrawal). To that end, when workers experience uplifts (e.g., completing a goal, receiving an award) or hassles (e.g., dealing with a difficult client, reacting to an updated deadline), their intention to continue or quit depends upon the emotions, moods, and thoughts associated with the satisfaction they derive from their jobs.

Other research has demonstrated that the relationship between job satisfaction and turnover is fully mediated by intention to quit; workers who report low job satisfaction are likely to engage in planned quitting. However, this relationship does not account for employees who report high job satisfaction, but quit unexpectedly. Although extrinsic rewards, such as better job offers outside their current organization, may influence their decisions, employees' personality factors may also impact their decisions to exit early from otherwise ideal jobs under ideal working conditions.

Recipients often refer to specific events in exit interviews when voluntarily leaving their current jobs. Minor events with subtle emotional effects also have a cumulative impact on job satisfaction, particularly when they occur acutely with high frequency. For example, perceived stressful events at work are often positively associated with high job strain on the day that they occur and negatively associated with strain the day after, resulting in an accumulation of perceived job-related stress over time. This is consistent with the general understanding in vocational psychology that job satisfaction is a distal, long-term outcome that is mediated by perceived job stress.

== Factors affecting employee experience at work ==
The relationships between components associated with work (e.g., tasks, autonomy, job demands, and emotional labor) and their impact on job outcomes support AET. Tasks that are considered challenging, rewarding, or that provide an opportunity to develop new skills induce positive affect and increase job satisfaction. Alternatively, tasks that are rated as routine, boring, or overwhelming are associated with negative affect (e.g., low self-esteem, low self-confidence) and concerns over job evaluations. This may lead workers to engage in planned quitting behaviours.

The degree of autonomy workers have in their jobs affects their productivity, satisfaction, and intention to quit. Research shows that the ability to make decisions and influence what happens on the job has the greatest impact on job satisfaction, particularly among young male workers. Job autonomy even trumps income's effect on job satisfaction. Alternatively, work overload significantly reduces job satisfaction among middle-aged women and men but does not significantly impact job satisfaction among young male workers. These differences between the age and gender of workers indicate differences in career phase, where young (male) workers are more likely to put up with or expect work overload, while middle-aged workers tend to be approaching their peak and may expect some concessions (e.g., based on track record, merit, or currency to the organization).

Likewise, work flexibility affects job satisfaction. In fact, the flexibility to decide when work is performed ranks number one among women and number two or three among men in determining the characteristics of a satisfying job. Similar to job autonomy, job flexibility is more important than income when evaluating job satisfaction. Flexibility to determine one's work schedule is an important contributor to job satisfaction across the spectrum of low- and high-income jobs. Work flexibility empowers employees by reducing the incidence of work-family conflicts and engagement in planned quitting to improve overall quality of life. Positive affect is a fringe benefit of work flexibility that pays rich dividends to both employees and their employers, empowering the former and improving the ability of the latter to retain workers.

Past research has suggested that workplace affect was a state-oriented construct (like emotions and mood) that depended upon the work environment or situations encountered at work. However, more recent research describes affect as a dispositional trait that is dependent upon the individual. Although workplace events have a significant impact on employees, their mood largely determines the intensity of their reaction to events experienced at work. This emotional response intensity tends to affect job performance and satisfaction. Other employment variables, like effort, leaving, deviance, commitment, and citizenship, are also affected by positive and negative perceptions of events experienced at work.

General cognitive ability (also known as 'g') and personality also influence job performance. Emotion and cognition help to explain Organizational Citizenship Behaviours (OCB). For example, emotions about one's job (i.e., job affect) are strongly associated with OCBs directed at individuals, while one's thoughts or job cognitions are reportedly more strongly associated with OCBs directed at the organization. The outcome of how satisfied an individual employee is with her/his job within the organization may depend upon how s/he perceives an incident experienced at work. Job satisfaction also depends upon the emotions and thoughts associated with that perception, as well as the social support provided by co-workers and the organization as a whole.

== Five factor model of personality ==
Personality research on the five factor model (FFM) supports AET. The FFM is a parsimonious model that distinguishes between differences among individuals' dispositions. This is done on the basis of five factors, each of which contains six underlying facets. Self-reported measures of conscientiousness, agreeableness, neuroticism, openness to experience, and extraversion consistently predict affect and outcome from events experienced at work. There is some evidence that other personality factors predict, explain, and describe how employees may react to affective events experienced at work. For instance, maladaptive traits derived from the Diagnostic and Statistical Manual correlate with work-related affect, but the incremental validity that these traits explain is minimal beyond the FFM.

=== Conscientiousness ===
In general, conscientiousness concerns delayed gratification. As a personality trait, conscientiousness involves regulating impulsiveness by following methodically determined plans to achieve nonimmediate goals. Of the five factors, conscientiousness is considered the best predictor of training and job performance and occupational attainment. Conscientiousness is demonstrated through employee industriousness, self-initiative, self-discipline, orderliness, and time management. It positively predicts intrinsic (i.e., job satisfaction) and extrinsic (i.e., compensation and benefit) career success. Accomplishment of complex tasks is correlated with high conscientiousness and general cognitive ability. Intention to leave an organization is less influenced by extrinsic reward than perceived procedural fairness, which is highly important to conscientious workers

Perceptions of the conscientiousness of others may also influence intention to provide assistance at work. Investigations examining the impact of the interaction between low performing members' g and conscientiousness on team-level prosocial behavior demonstrates that other team members are likely to exhibit high prosocial behavior when the poor performer is perceived to have low g and high conscientiousness or high g and high conscientiousness. Team members exhibit moderate levels of prosocial behavior when the poor performer exhibits low g and low conscientiousness. When the poor performer is perceived to have high g and low conscientiousness, other team members exhibit the least amount of prosocial behavior.

Conscientiousness and emotional stability predict low employee turnover and high job performance, indicating that these personality traits are robust and should be assessed during personnel selection in subsequent validation and utility analysis. Conscientiousness is considered to account for possible moral, ethical, and contractual obligations that may lead to employee turnover. In this mental state, employees high in conscientiousness may decide to demonstrate high organizational commitment due to transactional fairness in accordance with the norms of reciprocity, as long as a perceived debt exists. Highly religious and conscientious workers may believe that quitting goes against their work-oriented beliefs (e.g., the Protestant work ethic), with any volition to carry through with quitting, a sign of poor character.

=== Agreeableness ===
Individuals who are high in agreeableness exhibit prosocial behaviors, are cooperative, compassionate, and polite, and show sincere concern for the welfare and rights of others. Research links agreeableness with empathy and theory of mind to explain the emotions, intentions, and mental states of others. Agreeable workers are valued employees; their agreeableness is a key factor in maintaining their social relationships. Their tendency to strive toward integration, inclusion, and solidarity with others supports group cohesion. They tend to be helpful and concerned for the welfare of others. Agreeable workers also tend to experience high job satisfaction compared to less agreeable workers. Workers high in agreeableness tend to rate themselves as high in intrinsic motivation, particularly when work performed on behalf of others or an organization is considered. Heterogeneity of personality is important in team productivity, particularly where agreeableness is involved; having complete agreeableness among all members of a team is negatively related to performance as it tends to lead to groupthink.

The relationship between agreeableness and job satisfaction is most apparent in exchange-oriented or transactional work environments. When workers who are low in agreeableness are satisfied with their work environment and those they are required to interact with, they are likely to engage in prosocial organizational citizenship behaviors. Low-agreeable workers are likely to disengage in such behaviors when they find the work environment less favourable. Highly agreeable workers, on the other hand, are likely to engage in prosocial organizational citizenship behaviors regardless of the work climate, environment, or disposition of others they are required to work with, since they tend to focus more on the needs of others and the organization as opposed to keeping track of transactions. Further, deviant behavior is higher among workers low in agreeableness, particularly when organizational support is low.

Agreeableness and Conscientiousness are often linked to organizational citizenship behavior, however, such relationship is weak. Recent research suggests that agreeableness acts as a moderator that affects workers' experienced states of citizenship behavior. These two personality traits are also negatively correlated with employee turnover. Workers who self-report as low on agreeableness are likely to engage in unplanned quitting, leading to a condition known as the "Hobo Syndrome" (i.e., habitual job quitting).

=== Neuroticism ===
Individual sensitivity to punishment is at the core of neuroticism. Numerous findings show that neuroticism is related to the tendency to experience negative affect at work and other social environments. Neurotic individuals exhibit irritability, anxiety, impulsiveness, and self-consciousness that seems to underlie a general sensitivity to threat and punishment. The authors of the NEO-PI-R indicate that poor emotion regulation, low self-esteem, and excessive rumination are common among neurotic individuals.

The underlying anxiety implied by neuroticism is linked to emotional instability, which is typically important in predicting employees' intentions to quit. Low emotional stability is also linked with intention to quit for reasons other than job dissatisfaction or poor job performance. Neuroticism is the best predictor among the Big Five personality traits of negative job satisfaction. For example, neuroticism negatively predicts extrinsic (i.e., compensation and benefit) success. This is why conscientiousness (a great predictor of positive job performance and job satisfaction) and neuroticism (the best predictor of negative job satisfaction) are regularly used in personnel selection and personnel psychology. Neuroticism explains significant variation in mood and job satisfaction among workers.

=== Openness to experience ===
Openness to experience is exhibited through mental abstraction and flexibility in perception. Non-linear thinking is enabled through the use of imagination, intellectual curiosity, and an appreciation for aesthetics, all of which are core facets of this personality factor. Employees assessed as high in openness to experience generally score high on tests of general cognitive ability and demonstrate high abilities in information processing, working memory, abstract reasoning, and focused attention.

Workers high in openness to experience are more likely to engage in unplanned quitting. However, this finding may have little to do with affect derived from events experienced at work. Individuals who self-report as high in openness to experience may be impulsive, but their decisions to suddenly quit may be due to the value placed on job diversity, need for change, exploration of other interests, intolerance for routine and boredom, and an underlying sense of curiosity. Openness to experience does not appear to predict or explain job satisfaction.

=== Extraversion ===
Extraversion is considered to be responsible for individual sensitivity to reward. It is extraversion's underlying facets of assertiveness, sociability, and talkativeness that are reported to be related to approach tendencies within individuals toward either intrinsic or extrinsic rewards. Like most human activity, the currency of the world of work involves rewards. High sensitivity to reward seems to be synonymous with extraversion, making workers who exhibit high extraversion likely to be highly motivated and highly productive in independent and collaborative work. This is particularly heightened when work involves supervision of others, management of resources, or leadership.

Extraverts tend to experience more positive affect, perceive themselves more positively, and recall more positive than negative work events compared to introverts. Intention to quit among extraverts is less dependent upon procedural fairness within the organization, particularly when the opportunity for social rewards at work is perceived as high.

Conscientiousness and extraversion are the best predictors of positive job satisfaction.

== Mood ==
Workers' mood influences their job performance and job satisfaction. Hedonic tone explains most of the variation in how an event at work affects a worker's internal state (i.e., mood) and how this state is expressed to others. Even though positive events are reported three to five times more often, negative events have approximately five times the impact on mood. An inverse relationship exists between hedonic tone and work affect, with hedonic tone negatively related to work performance and positively related to work withdrawal. Workers are likely to be selfless and more altruistic when positive events occur, such as compliments, open acknowledgement of a job well-done, and promotions (which, in turn, seem to improve job performance). Negative events at work, however, are likely to cause negative mood in employees, resulting in negative work behaviours such as work slowdowns, work withdrawal, and absenteeism.

Mood may be moderated by organizational commitment which, in turn, may affect workers' decisions to stay or quit. For example, workers may suppress their true feelings and choose to dissociate their mood at work if they are high in continuance organizational commitment (i.e., committed due to social or economic costs of leaving). The same may be true for workers who are high in affective organizational commitment, which is typically the case for workers who are highly affiliated with their organizations (e.g., workers who have a family history of working for the same organization or who believe deeply in the organization's values or cause). Similarly, workers who are high in normative organizational commitment feel they have to put up with less-than-favourable work environmental conditions because of contractual obligations.

Research demonstrates that employee mood is a strong predictor of job satisfaction. Neuroticism and extraversion explain a lot of the variation in individual differences in job satisfaction, with variation in mood and job satisfaction accurately predicting an individual worker's level of neuroticism. There is also some indication that individuals may be predisposed to perceive events that occur at work as either negative or positive. The effect of positive events on job satisfaction is weaker among workers with high negative mood predisposition than those with low negative mood predisposition.

This predisposition to either be optimistic or pessimistic about job satisfaction may frame the job even before positive or negative events occur at work. To rule out the possibility of hiring personnel who come to the job with a negative outlook, the personality of potential employees should be evaluated through the use of standardized self-report personality inventories (e.g., NEO-PI-R) during the hiring process. Highly conscientious, agreeable, or extraverted personnel tend to be more satisfied with their jobs and, by extension, tend to stay longer in organizations. Alternatively, organizations may develop their own structured interview questions with behaviorally anchored rating scales (BARS) that provide further convergent validity on critical predictors of job performance (e.g., neuroticism). Such inventories, interviews, and tests must be reliable and valid in order to demonstrate their utility and legal defensibility in support of the selection and hiring process.

== Mitigating negative affect experienced from work-related events ==
The intensity of negative affect experienced at work often leads to work withdrawal, absenteeism, vandalism, and early exit. Organizations continually seek to select, train, and retain employees through incentives, compensation, benefits, and advancement. Such mechanisms influence the organizational commitment demonstrated by employees. Organizational commitment suggests that employees self-identify with their employers; the more individuals identify with their employing organizations, the more likely they are to support the organization and act in its best interest. Of the three components of organizational commitment (i.e., affective, continuance, and normative), affective organizational commitment is correlated with experiencing more positive affect at work. This organizational commitment style has a greater impact on affect than individual personality factors and traits.

This finding supports organizational psychological findings indicating that employee identification with the organization is based upon their affective commitment. In fact, there is a stronger correlation between positive emotions and affective commitment than between positive emotions and job satisfaction. The decision to continue working for an organization, however, does not seem to be dependent upon negative affect. Other factors, such as debt, pension implications, and future job prospects outside of the organization, must also be considered. Negative affect experienced through events at work may be related to changes in work performance, such as work withdrawal and absenteeism, as well as job satisfaction, but it does not seem to be the deciding factor on whether or not an employee will leave the organization.

== Psychosomatic complaint and health concerns due to emotions experienced at work ==
Research suggests that poor physical, mental, and emotional health can result from negative emotions experienced at work. This may be due to perfectionist dispositional tendencies that interact with daily hassels manifested through psychosomatic complaints. Workers who experience frequent thoughts of needing to be perfect tend to report more psychosomatic complaint. Psychosomatic complaint may also occur as a response to emotional dissonance caused by the need to suppress one's true feelings toward co-workers and more so toward patients, students, customers, or clients. Emotional labour or emotion work is required to achieve the effect required by the organization. As a consequence, workers may 'act' as opposed to 'feel' positive or negative emotions at work to remain compliant with an organizational code of conduct. However, adherence to such organizational norms may belie the true internal state of the individual worker. Authenticity and emotional harmony in such situations, may yield to dissonance and negatively impact on workers' health.

The resulting emotional dissonance may lead to increased stress symptoms and a general decrease in overall health.

Job satisfaction is negatively correlated with the need to suppress negative emotions on the job.

== Emotions at work ==
Emotions play an important role in how co-workers respond to poor performers. Emotions have a stronger influence than either expectancies or attributions in predicting behavioral intentions toward poor performing team members at work. In turn, this could spread to affect the emotions of other team members toward poor performance through contagion. Emotional outcomes have been shown to be depend upon whether workers are promotion- or protection-focused at work. Promotion-focused workers tend to exhibit eager risk-taking toward opportunities to demonstrate competence in order to accumulate gains, whereas protection-focused workers are inclined to show emotions that are more vigilant toward defending against erosion of their perceived credibility. Feeling good about one's job is not as strongly associated with overall job satisfaction as the need to work as a function of one's continuance commitment.

== Feedback and motivation ==
Performance feedback has an important influence on employee affect. Regular performance reviews are a well-established occurrence in most medium- to large-scale organizations. The type of performance feedback provided by supervisors and managers can affect subsequent employee performance and job satisfaction. Employees tend to rate a leader's effectiveness as low when leaders provide failure feedback with negative affect in feedback sessions. Similarly, team members tend to provide lower quality performance ratings on their collective tasks when negative affect accompanies failure feedback by leaders.

== See also ==
- Personality psychology
