= Qualifications and Credit Framework =

British educational credit system

The Qualifications and Credit Framework (QCF) was the national credit transfer system for education qualification in England, Northern Ireland and Wales between September 2011 and October 2015. The replacement was the Regulated Qualification Framework.

The QCF replaced the National Qualifications Framework (NQF), which closed for accreditations at the end of 2010.

Scotland has its own system, the Scottish Credit and Qualifications Framework.

== Overview ==
Every unit and qualification in the framework has a credit value (where one credit represents 10 hours of learning time). There are three different sizes of qualification:

- awards (1 to 12 credits)
- certificates (13 to 36 credits)
- diplomas (37 credits or more)

In addition, each qualification has a level of difficulty from Entry level at the bottom to Level 8 at the top.

The title of each qualification within this framework contains details of the size (award/certificate/diploma), level of difficulty (Entry to Level 8) and the general content of the qualification.

The QCF is a national framework, referenced to the European Qualifications Framework (EQF). The EQF is a meta-framework intended as a reference so that qualifications in nation frameworks such as the QCF are understood across member states. (Note that QCF levels 1-3 are equivalent to EQF levels 2-4.)

The QCF does not include previous qualifications that are now defunct, such as the O Level which was replaced by GCSEs in 1988. Officially, defunct qualifications are not part of the QCF and therefore have no level, but are still as valued as their replacement equivalent.

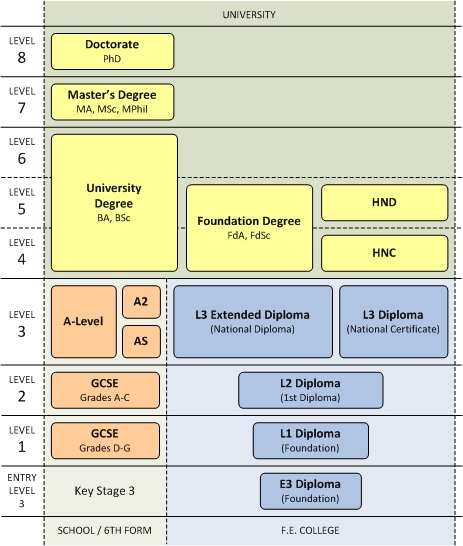
QCF levels for common English and Welsh qualifications (secondary/tertiary)

== See also ==
- Ofqual (Office of Qualifications and Examinations Regulation)
- Qualifications and Curriculum Development Agency
