= Institute for Learning =

UK professional body

the Institute for Learning

The Institute for Learning (IfL) was a voluntary membership, UK professional body. It ceased operating on 31 October 2014. Although precise membership figures and statistical details had been removed from IfL's webpage prior to its closure, at the end of financial year 2013-2014 IfL were reported as having only 33,500 of their 200,000 members remaining.

According to its statutory Memorandum of Association, the reason for which the IfL was established (the "Object") was: "to promote education and training for the public benefit by the enhancement and maintenance of the quality, standards and practice of learning and teaching."

According to IfL's WebPage, IfL existed "to support its members, as their professional body, to achieve excellence in their individual practice, helping them to deliver life-changing opportunities for their learners."

IfL was first incorporated in 2002 as a not-for-profit Company Limited by Guarantee when it was a voluntary professional membership body for teachers and trainers in the Post Compulsory Education and Training Sector in England.

Membership became compulsory between 2007 and 2012 when the IfL was acting as the regulatory body for teachers working in English further education colleges and other providers in receipt of government further education funding.

Membership of IfL became no longer compulsory as a result of the regulations requiring membership of IfL being repealed through revocation with effect from 30 September 2012. Preceding this, "in light of the interim report of an independent review of professionalism", the IfL reverted to its original status as a voluntary professional membership body.

The IfL stated it aims to support the professional teaching and training practice of its members for the benefit of learners in the UK. It also stated its members worked across the further education and skills sector, including adult and community learning, emergency and public services, FE colleges, the armed services, sixth-form colleges, the voluntary sector, offender learning and work-based learning.

== Closure ==
On 17 July 2014, the institute's Advisory Council, acting on the advice of its Non-Executive Board (NEB), voted that IfL should close with its assets passed to the Education and Training Foundation. This was due to concerns that its 33,500 members could not fund continued operation and decreasing membership numbers as a result of increased fees. Some members expressed concern that they were not consulted before a decision was made.

== Membership ==
=== Grades of Membership ===
IfL has five distinct grades or categories of membership. Those who are in initial teacher training, either pre-service or in service, may join IfL with an Affiliate grade of membership. Those who are part-qualified or who hold full qualifications in teaching or assessment at level 3/4 may hold an Associate grade of membership. Those with a full teaching qualification at level 5 or above (or at level 4 if qualified between September 2001 to September 2007 under the 2001 regulations) may progress to full Member grade of membership. Following extensive experience in further education teaching and the achievement of a higher degree (at Masters or Doctoral level) members become eligible for Fellow grade of membership.

Associates (AIfL), Members (MIfL) and Fellows (FIfL) are entitled to use post-nominal letters in recognition of their professional status.

In addition to the four categories of membership available to further education teaching or training professionals, the Companion grade of membership is open to those with an active interest in teaching or training but who are not themselves teaching or training professionals, for example HR professionals; leaders and managers who do not have teaching or training backgrounds and those working in further education support roles. Companion membership is not recognised through the conferral of post-nominal letters.

=== Conditions of IfL Membership ===
IfL publishes Conditions of Membership describing the individual relationship between members and the professional body.

Revised conditions of membership came into effect on 1 October 2012 for the membership period through to 31 March 2013 (1 year membership) or 31 March 2014 (2 year membership). The conditions of membership make it clear that:

"Companions, Affiliates, Associates, Members and Fellows, referred to throughout the conditions of membership as ‘members’, are members of IfL, the professional body for teachers and trainers and not members as defined by the Companies Act unless otherwise elected to IfL's Advisory Council."

== Work of the IfL ==
=== Professional formation (QTLS and ATLS) ===
IfL members are not required to achieve QTLS or ATLS, for which there is a charge of £485 (see below), but are encouraged to do so by IfL (who set, collect and administer payment as well as being the sole awarding body) as a demonstration of the currency of their teaching practice.

Professional formation Qualified Teacher Learning and Skills (QTLS) and Associate Teacher Learning & Skills (ATLS) is IfL's optional, post-qualification process by which a teacher demonstrates through professional practice;

1. The ability to use effectively the skills and knowledge acquired whilst training to be a teacher.
2. The capacity to meet the occupational standards required of a teacher.

From September 2012 this was no longer mandatory for college lecturers, following the BIS review of professionalism, however, with QTLS being referenced in school legislation, it remains the only reference point for parity of profession esteem between further education and school teaching.

The Final Report into Professionalism in Further Education states: "following the announcement by the Secretary of State for Education in July 2012 that teachers in academies will no longer be subject to mandatory teaching qualification, and in the light of the government's belief that most secondary schools will become academies by 2015, this formal interchangeability is likely to be of diminishing practical value. Academies will be free to employ any lecturer from the further education sector, if they so wish."

It was against this policy backdrop that in February 2013 IfL announced it would be charging member £485 to undertake professional formation, stating:

"The statutory requirement to obtain QTLS and ATLS was removed in September 2012, along with government funding of professional formation for individual teachers and trainers. IfL now needs to charge £485 for professional formation to cover the cost of the process.

Payment will be able to be made in two installments:

- First installment of £100 upon completion of the expression of intent form
- Final installment of £385 upon completion of the application and submission of completed webfolio

We have worked to keep the price down, and considering the value and recognition that QTLS brings we believe this offers good value to members."

=== Consultations ===
IfL consults its members on relevant government consultations to ensure their collective views are heard by those making the decisions that influence the FE and skills sector. These consultations have included the Spending Review Challenge and the Wolf Review.

=== QTLS and QTS ===
IfL worked for recognition of further education teachers with Qualified Teacher Learning and Skills (QTLS) status as qualified able to teach in schools for as long as they maintain IfL membership. Previously this was not the case, although school teachers with Qualified Teacher Status (QTS) can teach in further education colleges.

IfL made the case for the professionalism of its members, gave evidence to the education select committee and to the Skills Commission inquiry into teacher training for vocational teachers, negotiated with government officials, and presented the case to partner organisations.

Following a consultation with members in October 2010, IfL drew on the input from more than 5,000 IfL members to present evidence to Professor Wolf's consultation. Professor Alison Wolf's subsequently recommended, in her independent review of vocational education, that further education teachers with Qualified Teacher Learning and Skills (QTLS) status should be recognised to teach in schools. On 3 March 2011, a policy decision was taken by Michael Gove MP, secretary of state for education, to accept Professor Wolf's recommendation, with immediate effect.

The recommendations of the Wolf Report and the decisions of the Rt. Hon. Michael Gove MP, Member of Parliament for Surrey Heath and Secretary of State for Education, do not represent a direct interchangeability between QTLS and QTS and teachers trainers and lecturers with QTLS will not be allowed to start working as full-time teachers delivering ordinary lessons in schools other than Academies and Free Schools. They will be able to take on teaching in state schools under local authority control for vocational classes and other courses where they have the subject expertise. The wolf report also recommends that only 20% of the classes which students undertake at the 14-16 age group should be vocational qualifications, meaning that work for QTLS holders in schools would be limited to around one day a week. The number of students taking vocational qualifications at this level is around 15%, further limiting the number of job roles which this announcement actually covers.

This decision by the government was not accepted by all sections of the teaching community, with unions representing secondary school teachers identifying it as part of the race to the bottom, and an attempt to undercut the pay of teachers in secondary schools.

With regard to QTLS, the Professionalism in Further Education Final Report (October 2012) states:

BIS and LSIS are working with the Department for Education to ensure that clear routes to the equivalence of QTLS and QTS are maintained.....following the announcement by the Secretary of State for Education in July 2012 that teachers in academies will no longer be subject to mandatory teaching qualification, and in the light of the government’s belief that most secondary schools will become academies by 2015, this formal interchangeability is likely to be of diminishing practical value. Academies will be free to employ any lecturer from the further education sector, if they so wish.

=== Governance ===
IfL's current governance structure has been in place since January 2010. IfL is governed by an Advisory Council, consisting of up to sixty members, which meets three times a year and Non-Executive Board (NEB), consisting of up to nine members, which meets nine times a year. Up to 45 members are elected to the Advisory Council, together with up to 15 representatives from stakeholder and partner organisations appointed by the Advisory Council. Advisory Council members are the ‘members of the Company’ as required by the Companies Act 2006. The NEB of nine elected members and three stakeholder representatives is constituted following Advisory Council election. The NEB members are the Directors of IfL (the 'company limited by guarantee') as required by Company law. The NEB has the facility to appoint up to three co-opted Board members to provide expertise in areas where the Board feels it is lacking.

Joseph Lee, editor of the FE Focus supplement of the Times Educational Supplement commented: "Members cannot exert meaningful leverage on the leadership of the IfL as it stands. Yes, there is an elaborate apparatus of an advisory council and non-executive board. But a review of governance in 2009 merely resulted in adding more committee members, up to an unwieldy total of 60: that is a recipe for lip-service to special interests, not focused decision-making." Lee's opinion was expressed in 2011, when IfL was a mandatory, regulatory body. It is not a statement of fact regarding the current efficacy of governance.

After government repealed regulations requiring membership of IfL, Barry Lovejoy (UCU's National Head of Further Education) criticised IfL's governance process whilst commenting on its failures by saying: "Part of the reason for these failures was its governance processes which left real decision making to a small leadership group, often ignoring what its own Advisory Council suggested". Dan Taubman, a member of the Institute for Learning's Council since inception, criticised IfL's failures when he stated: "IfL purported to be the voice of profession but IfL members didn’t really have channels to tell IfL how they felt and what they wanted". Dan Taubman (UCU Senior National Official) was a member of IfL's Transitional Council, the successor Advisory Council and a Director of IfL throughout this period through his position on IfL's Non-Executive Board (the 'small leadership group' referred to by Lovejoy).

The Professional Associations Research Network (PARN), a not-for-profit research and membership organisation, publishes governance research and benchmarking data based on its work with professional associations, including a governance strategic review of IfL in 2011. The Chief Executive of PARN, Andrew Friedman, was a contributor to the BIS Review of Professionalism. Friedman believes that in creating and refining governance structures "a balance must be struck between achieving strategic direction and democratic participation of members and stakeholders." In May 2012 Friedman reported on his assessment of the effectiveness of IfL's governance structures, recommending that to be effective "the board should be smaller than the current NEB." Bea Groves, President of IfL, responded by stating that "in the interests of democracy, stakeholders must not have undue influence, and their involvement must be at arm’s length". At this time the stakeholders represented on IfL's NEB were the Association of Colleges (AoC), the University and College Union (UCU) and the Universities' Council for the Education of Teachers (UCET); the UCU and AoC maintaining their directorship of IfL throughout the dispute over membership fees. Speaking about IfL's governance arrangements, Dan Taubman stated that he "would put his hand up and say that he was part of the working party that got it wrong".

=== Governance and diversity ===
In 2011 IfL's Advisory Council elected Bea Groves as its second president. As a transgender woman, Groves is highly active in the area of diversity and is held up as an inspiration for others who are dealing with similar issues. Groves is proud of both her identity and her professionalism, stating: "I think I am the first transgender person to become national president of a professional body in the UK, and believe strongly that the post-compulsory sector should recognise diversity in all its forms. I want to show minority groups, including the trans community, that there need not be barriers to success. I want to celebrate how IfL embraces diversity."

=== IfL patrons ===
IfL has the support of six patrons, the first four patrons: Baroness Sharp of Guildford, formerly a Liberal Democrat spokesperson for further and higher education; Barry Sheerman, member of parliament for Huddersfield and former chair of the education select committee; Tim Boswell, former member of the innovation, universities, science and skills select committee; and Stella Mbubaegbu CBE, principal and chief executive of Highbury College Portsmouth were announced on 30 March 2011.

On 28 June 2011 IfL announced two further patrons, Geoff Petty, a writer, staff trainer and consultant, who has worked with over 200 colleges and most national educational agencies and Professor Ann Hodgson, who works for the University of London's Institute of Education, researches and publishes in the areas of education policy; 14-19 education and training; lifelong learning; curriculum and qualifications reform; and institutional organisation and governance.

The IfL has described the purpose of its patrons as:

...support IfL and our quest to elevate the status of teachers and trainers throughout our diverse sector. Their association will help raise awareness of the important work that IfL is doing with our membership to influence policymaking, support continuing professional development (CPD) and facilitate communities of practice, for the benefit of teachers and trainers, and their learners.

== 2011 membership fees dispute ==
=== Dispute history ===
In February 2009 the IfL launched its 5-year plan for 2009–2014, this was reported in the TES where it was noted that the 2008 membership survey indicated that 47% of members joined because they were required to do so by their employer. Of these, some (not quantified) felt 'they had been forced to join against their will'. A typical comment from this group was: 'I feel bullied into being a member and totally resent the existence of this organisation'. Others (not quantified) voiced support for Ifl, one describing it as 'a great tool in order to advance our teachers, trainers and tutors into the next decade'. It is against this backdrop that the membership fees dispute started.

In November 2009, government set out in Skills for Growth that IfL would need to become self-financed 'within three years', a position that was accepted by IfL's chief executive Toni Fazaeli. With the results of the UK general election in May 2010 returning no clear majority the subsequent formation of a coalition government introduced a number of uncertainties with respect to public policy. The coalition government confirmed in Skills for Sustainable Growth (November 2010) that the cost of funding IfL membership would move from government to the individual, a model prevalent in most forms of professional regulation. It wasn't until much later in 2010 (late December) that IfL was made aware of the transitional funding government would provide.

=== Publication of subscription arrangements ===
The subscription arrangements were subsequently disclosed, in an embargoed letter from IfL's Chief Executive Toni Fazaeli to employers on 4 February 2011, prior to informing members on 8 February 2011. Standard membership fees were originally due to rise from £30 per year (government paid) to £68 (for 18 months in the transitional period), as IfL membership would no longer be fully funded by the Department for Business Innovation and Skills (BIS). Previously membership had been at no cost to members required to join IfL by the Further Education Teachers’ Continuing Professional Development and Registration (England) Regulations 2007 or through requirements placed on learning providers by the Skills Funding Agency (SFA).

=== Initial objections raised ===
The scale of the increase and the transfer of payment from government to individual teachers and trainers caused some controversy to be reported in FE Focus, an insert to the Times Educational Supplement. UCU expressed surprise that IfL escaped David Cameron's 2010 UK quango reforms (AKA "Bonfire of The Quangos"), and opposed the increase including a petition open to the general public. As a not-for-profit company limited by guarantee IfL is not a quango and can not be abolished by government or act of parliament. Dan Taubman, the Senior National Education Officer of UCU (and formerly of NATFHE), represented the union's interests in the setting up of IfL as a member of its council and was an elected member of IfL's non-executive board at the time UCU questioned IfL's status as a quango.

IfL stated that if FE tutors did not pay then, according to the Further Education Teachers’ Continuing Professional Development and Registration (England) Regulations 2007 and the extension of these regulations to other learning providers through the terms of SFA contracts, they would no longer be permitted to teach:

Any individual resigning from membership or allowing membership to lapse by failing to pay a due subscription will lose the entitlement to hold QTLS or ATLS status and any other designation related to their membership grade and will not be able to be employed in a teaching or training role in a college covered by the regulations or learning provider in receipt of a Skills Funding Agency contract.

=== Fees amended ===
On 7 June 2011 IfL issued a joint statement with further education college trade unions and college employers, following discussions facilitated by the Department for Business, Innovation and Skills (BIS). This detailed progress made across eight areas, including revised fees and concession for 2011/12 and 2012/13. The membership fee of £68 now provided extended membership from 18 months to two years, with an option of paying an annualised fee of £38 and a new concessionary fee for those earning below £16,000 a year.

=== Boycott over fees ===
UCU followed an internal referendum with an industrial action ballot to formalise the boycott of IfL fees.

Before the ballot was concluded however, IfL published guidelines which stated that IfL members who had not renewed their membership by 22 July would have their status changed to "lapsed". An IfL spokeswoman said individual membership lapsing following non-payment by the due date is "standard practice in other regulated professions, such as medicine or law". As membership was then compulsory for FE teachers by law, this would have led to them being prevented from teaching, the IfL confirmed.

Michael Scott, UCU's national head of legal services and employment law, an expert in Employment Law but with no stated expertise in regulatory law (Law Society listing), said that in his opinion anyone failing to adhere to the IfL code of conduct – such as by withholding subs – has the right to "a fair and public hearing in keeping with the rights conferred on individuals by the Human Rights Act … reflecting …that no person may have their livelihood taken away from them without observing due process" and described the IfL's stance as "wholly unreasonable and irrational". The code of conduct states: "The members shall at all times act in accordance with the Institute’s conditions of membership". Mr Scott's opinion on the application of the Human Rights Act to membership of a professional regulatory body has never been tested in law.

In a letter to IfL chief Toni Fazaeli, Mr Scott warned that in his opinion "interfering in the trade dispute by placing pressure on union members" was "potentially unlawful". Mr Scott has since said that the union would take legal action unless the IfL softened its stance. This despite the fact that, at that time, UCU had not declared a trade dispute with employers. UCU Members were surveyed and 27% (90% of the 30% who took part) of the unions FE members voted for formal industrial action on 25 July 2011. The turn out in the ballot was around 30% with 90% voting to boycott IfL. UCU came under criticism for this survey which, it transpired, was open to the general public and could be completed by non-members without any membership validation. Former deputy chief executive of the IfL, Lee Davies, called this 'slapdash' and 'undermined the union as a democratic voice, especially given a low response rate'

=== Scale of non-renewal ===
On the deadline for registration (July 2011) IfL management stated that more than 67,000 of its previous 200,000 members had renewed. IfL stated in their joint statement that there were a potential 144,800 members for 2011/12 and UCU has 34,505 members in the FE sector. In September 2011 the IfL had a membership of over 75,000. In November 2013 IfL noted that "membership was likely to reach 35,000".

=== Independent review ===
In early September 2011 it was reported that "The government is to hold an independent review into workforce professionalisation, including the effectiveness of the Institute for Learning (IfL). John Hayes MP, minister for education, skills and lifelong learning, said the broad review would look at arrangements to achieve a professionalised workforce in further education, while also looking at the role of the IfL. However, it would only be commissioned once parties agree to refrain from seeking legal action in the aftermath of the dispute over memberships IfL fees."

On 7 September 2011, UCU suspended its threatened legal action against the IfL and welcomed the decision of the Minister for Further Education, John Hayes, to commission an independent review into professional development for college lecturers that would involve looking at the role and effectiveness of the Institute for Learning. Sally Hunt, general secretary of UCU stated: "Boycotting the IfL has not been a decision our members have taken lightly, but to be effective as a professional body it must enjoy the confidence of the majority of practitioners. This is something the IfL does not have. It is essential that the forthcoming review does not shy away from asking awkward questions and that it hears directly from staff.".

On 8 September 2011 an IfL press release stated that the IfL would "engage positively with the proposed review".

On 9 September 2011 the AoC took the step of calling on member colleges not to discipline staff for non-payment of IfL fees.

In March 2012, after more than a year of dispute surrounding compulsory membership of IfL, the review board led by Lord Lingfield published an interim report, stating: "We conclude that leaving matters as they are is not a practicable option … With the benefit of nearly five years of State funding and regulatory backing, the IfL has not won the confidence of those organisations which should be its partners. Regulatory compulsion increased the IfL’s membership from 4,000 to over 200,000 before it fell back to around 85,000 this year … The main response by the IfL to an end to government funding has been to seek to pass its costs on to FE staff, who are compelled to register with it … The IfL has made no other substantial changes, for example in the services it offers, which might have convinced lecturers that their subscription represented good value for money." The report called for the IfL be restored "to its original status as a private membership body, dependent on voluntary subscriptions in return for services."

In September 2012, following the review of professionalism in further education teaching undertaken by the Department for Business, Innovation and Skills, the statutory requirement to register as a member if IfL was repealed. This was welcomed by the University and College Union. Whilst UCU welcomed the news that "staff in further education colleges would no longer be forced to pay a fee to do their job". They also stated: "While the review leans (not surprisingly from this government) towards the need for less regulation, UCU does not support a deregulated sector. Employers in the sector – both colleges and private and voluntary institutions – have been found wanting in providing consistent and high quality support and resources for professional development."

=== Surplus funds ===
It was reported in March 2011, IfL had generated surplus funds in the region of £2m. This is in line with IfL's Reserves Policy (to maintain reserves at a level consistent with established good business practice and that is prudent). IfL maintains its status as an independent and self-regulating professional body and not-for-profit private company limited by guarantee and financial statements and policies are available from the IfL website.

== Historical context ==
IfL is a private company limited by guarantee. The Prime Report (Further Education Development Agency (FEDA), 1995) was a key milestone in the creation of the institute, leading in 1996 to the establishment of the Staff Development Forum for Further Education (FESDF). The forum comprised a wide range of UK representatives including the Association of Colleges (AoC), the National Association of Teachers in Further and Higher Education (NATFHE), the Association of College Principals (ACP), the Further Education Funding Council for England (FEFC) and the Department for Education and Skills (DfES); with staff from FEDA acting as the secretariat and project managing the development of national teaching standards for further education.

In 1997, Lucas and Betts (et al.) in "Policy and Management Issues for Incorporated Colleges" (Institute of Education) noted that although FEDA had established the Staff Development Forum for FE, it was a member-led professional body that was needed to develop a framework of professional development in the sector. In the event, the newly elected Labour government accepted the findings of the Dearing Report into Higher Education, leading to the creation of the Institute for Learning and Teaching in Higher Education (ILTHE) and indicated that the General Teaching Council (GTC) for England, which had been a manifesto commitment, would be established.

In 1999, within a backdrop of growing concern from teachers in further education about a sense of de-professionalising the sector, the FESDF became the Further Education National Training Organisation (FENTO). One of the FESDF's proposed objectives for FENTO was the need to give consideration to the role that a professional body for further education could play in the professionalisation agenda; this become one of FENTO's key strategic objectives. In 2000, three research studies were carried into the feasibility of creating a professional body for further education, two commissioned by FENTO and one a contemporary piece of academic research. Effectively, each was an exercise in market research and, based in sample sizes in the low thousands, the outcomes were consistent – two-thirds of staff surveyed were in support, 30% wanted to ‘wait and see’ and less than 10% were opposed.

In 2001 a business plan was established by the FENTO Council and a name was chosen, the Institute for Learning (FE) – to be comparable with the ILT (HE) as one of its important interfaces. At this point the government amplified the focus on the professionalism of further education teachers with regulations requiring all new teachers to hold a recognised teaching qualification, based on the new FENTO standards, with a target of a fully qualified workforce by 2010. Early 2002 the Institute for Learning was incorporated, the Memorandum and Articles of Association were signed by founder members Pauline Lovell and Derek Betts, a Transitional Council was formed and the process of attracting a "volunteer" paying membership began.

In November 2004 the Institute for Learning's prospects of becoming a fully established professional body were given a significant boost with the publication of the key DfES policy document, ‘Equipping our Teachers for the Future’.

For the Institute for Learning, with a growing membership in the low thousands, section 4.7 of the document came to represent a key turning-point:

The active involvement of the leading professionals in the sector is crucial to the effective management of the reforms. We want the Institute (for Learning) to have an influential voice as the professional body representing teachers in the sector, and to play a central role in the reform of initial teacher training.

With one critical modification; the extension of the registration and CPD elements to all teachers in the sector (and not just new entrants), "Equipping our Teachers" was introduced more-or-less as projected. The Institute for Learning was afforded responsibilities in the Further Education Teachers’ Qualifications (England) Regulations 2007 and the Further Education Teachers' Continuing Professional Development and Registration (England) Regulations 2007 governing the registration, professional formation and remaining in good standing through CPD of teachers in further education. The requirements of the regulations were extended to learning providers funded by the Learning and Skills Council (LSC) through the terms of their 2007/08 locally negotiated contracts.

In 2010 an enlarged Advisory Council was elected consisting of 45 Member representatives, 15 partner organisation representatives and 5 observers. From that a Non-executive Board was elected consisting of 9 member representatives, 3 partner reps and potentially 3 Expert Directors. All communication with members of this governance board is directed via a single company secretary.

The first Chief executive Toni Fazaeli was appointed in June 2008. The first president of the Institute For Learning, John Chorley was elected in August 2010.

== See also ==
- British Educational Communications and Technology Agency (Becta)
- Department for Business, Innovation and Skills (BIS)
- Department for Innovation, Universities and Skills (DIUS)
- Learning and Skills Council (LSC)
- Skills Funding Agency (SFA)
