= List of economics journals =

The following is a list of scholarly journals in economics containing most of the prominent academic journals in economics.

Popular magazines or other publications related to economics, finance, or business are not listed.

== A ==
- Affilia
- African Journal of Economic Policy
- Agrekon
- Agricultural Economics
- American Economic Journal
- American Economic Review
- American Journal of Agricultural Economics
- American Journal of Economics and Sociology
- Annual Review of Economics
- Applied Econometrics and International Development
- Applied Economic Perspectives and Policy
- Asian Economic Papers

== B ==
- Brookings Papers on Economic Activity
- Business Economics

== C ==
- Cambridge Journal of Economics
- Canadian Journal of Economics
- Carnegie-Rochester Conference Series on Public Policy
- Computational Economics
- Contemporary Economic Policy

== D ==
- D+C Development and Cooperation

== E ==
- Eastern Economic Journal
- Econ Journal Watch
- Econometric Theory
- Econometrica
- Econometrics Journal
- Economic Affairs
- Economic and Industrial Democracy
- Economic Development and Cultural Change
- Economic History Review
- Economic Inquiry
- The Economic Journal
- Economic Modelling
- Economic Policy
- Economic Theory
- Economica
- Economics Letters
- Economics of Governance
- Economics & Sociology
- De Economist
- Education Finance and Policy
- Electronic Commerce Research
- Energy Economics
- Essays in Economic & Business History
- European Economic Review
- European Journal of Health Economics
- European Journal of Political Economy
- European Review of Agricultural Economics
- Explorations in Economic History

== F ==
- Feminist Economics
- Fiscal Studies

== G ==
- Games and Economic Behavior
- German Economic Review

== H ==
- Health Economics

== I ==
- Industrial and Labor Relations Review
- Intereconomics
- International Economic Review
- International Journal of Central Banking
- International Review of Economics & Finance
- Investment Analysts Journal

== J ==
- Japanese Economic Review
- Journal of Agricultural Economics
- Journal of Applied Econometrics
- Journal of Banking and Finance
- Journal of Behavioral Finance
- Journal of Business and Economic Statistics
- Journal of Cleaner Production
- Journal of Common Market Studies
- Journal of Comparative Economics
- Journal of Competition Law and Economics
- Journal of Cultural Economics
- Journal of Development Economics
- Journal of Econometrics
- Journal of Economic Behavior and Organization
- Journal of Economic Dynamics and Control
- Journal of Economic Education
- Journal of Economic Geography
- Journal of Economic History
- Journal of Economic Issues
- Journal of Economic Literature
- Journal of Economic Perspectives
- Journal of Economic Theory
- Journal of Economics & Management Strategy
- Journal of Emerging Market Finance
- Journal of Environmental Economics and Management
- Journal of the European Economic Association
- Journal of Finance
- Journal of Financial and Quantitative Analysis
- Journal of Financial Economics
- Journal of Financial Studies
- Journal of Health Economics
- Journal of Human Capital
- Journal of Institutional Economics
- Journal of International Economics
- Journal of International Money and Finance
- Journal of Labor Economics
- Journal of Law and Economics
- The Journal of Law, Economics, & Organization
- Journal of Macroeconomics
- Journal of Mathematical Economics
- Journal of Monetary Economics
- Journal of Money, Credit and Banking
- Journal of Policy Modeling
- Journal of Political Economy
- Journal of Public Economics
- Journal of Regional Science
- Journal of Sports Economics
- Journal of Trading
- Journal of Urban Economics
- Journal of Wine Economics
- The Journal of Risk

== K ==
- The Korean Economic Review
- Kyklos (journal)

== L ==
- Land Economics

== M ==
- Macroeconomic Dynamics
- The Manchester School
- Marine Resource Economics
- Mathematical Social Sciences

== N ==
- National Institute Economic Review
- New Political Economy

== O ==
- ORDO – Jahrbuch für die Ordnung von Wirtschaft und Gesellschaft (The Ordo Yearbook of Economic and Social Order)
- Oxford Review of Economic Policy

== P ==
- Post-Communist Economies
- Public Choice

== Q ==
- Quarterly Journal of Austrian Economics
- Quarterly Journal of Economics

== R ==
- RAND Journal of Economics
- Real-world economics review
- Regional Science and Urban Economics
- Research in Economics
- Rethinking Marxism
- Review of Agricultural Economics
- Review of Economic Design
- Review of Economic Dynamics
- Review of Economic Studies
- Review of Economics and Statistics
- Review of Environmental Economics and Policy
- Review of International Organizations
- Review of International Political Economy
- Review of Keynesian Economics
- Review of Radical Political Economics
- Rivista Internazionale di Scienze Sociali

== S ==
- Scandinavian Journal of Economics
- Science and Society
- Scottish Journal of Political Economy
- Series of Unsurprising Results in Economics
- Singapore Economic Review
- Small Business Economics
- Socio-Economic Review
- South African Journal of Economic History
- South African Journal of Economics
- South Asia Economic Journal
- South Asian Journal of Macroeconomics and Public Finance
- Southern Economic Journal
- South Asian Journal of Macroeconomics and Public Finance
- Studies in Microeconomics
- Swiss Journal of Economics and Statistics

== T ==
- The Econometrics Journal

== W ==
- Wirtschaftsdienst

== See also ==
- List of environmental economics journals
- List of open access journals
- List of scholarly journals in international business
- List of scientific journals
