= JEL classification system =

System for classifying economics research

Articles in economics journals are usually classified according to classification codes derived from the Journal of Economic Literature (JEL). The JEL is published quarterly by the American Economic Association (AEA) and contains survey articles and information on recently published books and dissertations. The AEA maintains EconLit, a searchable data base of citations for articles, books, reviews, dissertations, and working papers classified by JEL codes for the years from 1969. A recent addition to EconLit is indexing of economics journal articles from 1886 to 1968 parallel to the print series Index of Economic Articles.

Developed in the context of the Journal of Economic Literature, the JEL classification system became a standard method of classifying economics literature, including journal articles, books, collective volume articles, dissertations, working papers in economics, book reviews from the Journal of Economic Literature, and EconLit.

== Structure ==
There are 26 primary JEL categories:

| JEL Codes^{[α]} | General Categories |
|---|---|
| A | General Economics and Teaching |
| B | History of Economic Thought, Economic Methodology, and Heterodox Approaches |
| C | Mathematical and Quantitative Methods |
| D | Microeconomics |
| E | Macroeconomics and Monetary Economics |
| F | International Economics |
| G | Financial Economics |
| H | Public Economics |
| I | Health, Education, and Welfare |
| J | Labor Economics and Demographic Economics |
| K | Law and Economics |
| L | Industrial Organization |
| M | Business Administration and Business Economics • Marketing • Accounting • Personnel Economics |
| N | Economic History |
| O | Economic Development, Innovation, Technological Change, and Growth |
| P | Economic Systems |
| Q | Agriculture and Natural Resource Economics • Environmental and Ecological Economics |
| R | Urban, Rural, Regional, Real Estate, and Transportation Economics |
| Y | Miscellaneous Categories |
| Z | Other Special Topics |

Each JEL primary category has secondary and tertiary subcategories, for example, under JEL: D – Microeconomics:

JEL: D1 – Household Behavior and Family Economics

JEL: D11 – Consumer Economics: Theory

JEL code (sub)categories, including periodic updates, are referenced at Journal of Economic Literature (JEL) Classification System.

== Purpose ==
Articles in economics journals also list JEL codes, facilitating their use across search engines. Comprehensive uses of JEL (sub)classifications include:

- The New Palgrave Dictionary of Economics, 2008, v. 8, Appendix IV, pp. 854–69, and for the online version by drilling to the primary, secondary, or tertiary JEL code of interest here and pressing the Search button below it for article-preview links .
- National Bureau of Economic Research Working Papers abstracts by year via links
- Research Papers in Economics via links.

== Notes ==
^α JEL codes A through Z denote primary categories (e.g. D Microeconomics). Secondary categories are specified by an additional Arabic numeral (e.g. D3 Distribution), tertiary categories by a following second Arabic numeral (e.g. D30 General). Articles in economics publications use JEL codes in this manner: JEL: B12.
