= Rhema Vaithianathan =

Health economics researcher in New Zealand

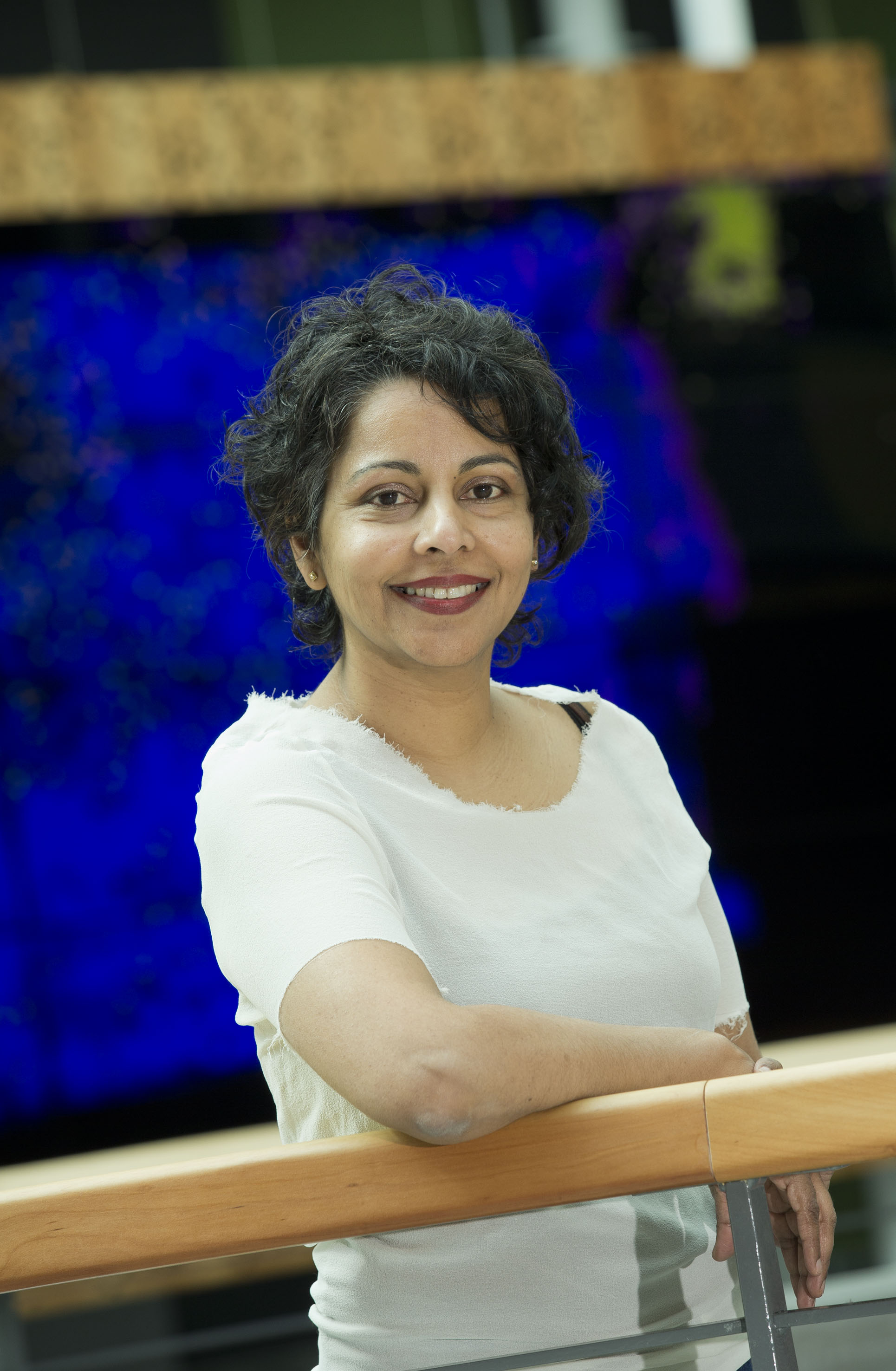
- Vaithianathan in 2014.
- Education: University of Auckland
- Known for: Health Economics, Big Data, Predictive Risk Modelling
- Scientific career
- Fields: Health economics, big data
- Workplaces: Auckland University of Technology
- Thesis: Economic incentives and clinical decisions (1999)

Professor Rhema Vaithianathan is a New Zealand academic who specialises in the field of health economics, and big data. She is a Professor in the School of Economics at Auckland University of Technology and is a co-director of the Centre for Social Data Analytics within that school.

== Career ==
=== Tertiary education ===
Vaithianathan gained a Bachelor of Commerce in Economics in 1989, followed by Masters of Commerce (First-class Honours) in Economics in 1995, and a PhD in Economics in 2000, all from the University of Auckland.

Vaithianathan received a PhD fellowship from the Health Research Council of New Zealand, Vaithianathan's PhD thesis, Economic Incentives and Clinical Decisions, studied the economic incentives of questionable behaviour in the medical profession.

During her PhD studies Vaithianathan won the McKinsey Prize for Best Paper at the Australian PhD Conference in Business and Economics in 1997, and the Jan Whitwell Prize for Best Student Paper in 1998. She also won the prize for the Best Doctoral Dissertation in the Faculty of Business and Economics at the University of Auckland in 2000.

=== Early career ===
Between 1988 and 1999, Vaithianathan worked as: A Policy Analyst for the New Zealand Treasury, a Health Economist for the Northern Regional Health Authority, an Economic Consultant for the New Zealand Health Funding Authority, and a Health Economist at the Waitemata District Health Board.

=== Academic career ===
Vaithianathan commenced her academic career as a research fellow at Australian National University in 2000, returning to the University of Auckland as a lecturer in the School of Economics in 2002.

In 2007 Vaithianathan was awarded a Harkness Fellowship, one of the most prestigious awards in health policy. Vaithianathan spent her year-long fellowship at the Department of Health Care Policy, Harvard University Medical School, Boston in 2007-08. Her Harkness Fellowship project was entitled Insurance Coverage and Cost Growth.

Vaithianathan returned to the University of Auckland in 2009 as an Associate Professor.

In 2013, Vaithianathan joined the Department of Economics (now School of the Economics) at Auckland University of Technology as a full professor.

In 2014, Vaithianathan was appointed Director of the Singapore Life Panel (hosted by the Centre for Research on the Economics of Ageing at the Singapore Management University). The Panel is a monthly, online-based survey of older Singaporean citizens recognised as one of the largest high-frequency surveys globally. Vaithianathan retains this role as a partial appointment.

In 2016, Vaithianathan established the Centre for Social Data Analytics in the School of Economics at Auckland University of Technology, together with Professor Tim Maloney. She and Maloney run the Centre as co-directors.

Vaithianathan is a member of Data Futures, a government-academia collaboration on data-use; her work with big data has received press attention.

== Research interests ==
Vaithianathan's research interests include:

- Health services,
- Health Economics,
- Big data
- Predictive Risk Modelling.

== Current research projects ==
Since 2014, Vaithianathan's research has had a strong focus on predictive-risk modelling. Current projects include:

- Allegheny Family Screening Tool: Rhema leads the international research team that has developed this predictive-risk modelling tool which is used as a decision support tool by child welfare call screeners in Allegheny County, Pennsylvania, US.
- Douglas County Decision Aid: Rhema is leading the research team developing this predictive-risk model which will be used during child-welfare decision making. Unlike the Allegheny Family Screening Tool, this tool will not use fully integrated data.
- Health Education England Working Across Wessex MyDay Survey: Vaithianathan is overseeing the development and implementation of MyDay, a purpose-built online survey that collects anonymous data from up to 2100 trainee doctors about their workplace wellbeing.

== Publications ==
- Gørgens, Tue, Xin Meng, and Rhema Vaithianathan. "Stunting and selection effects of famine: A case study of the Great Chinese Famine." Journal of development Economics 97, no. 1 (2012): 99-111.
- Hurley, Jeremiah, Rhema Vaithianathan, Thomas Crossley, and Deborah Cobb-Clark. "Parallel private health insurance in Australia: A cautionary tale and lessons for Canada." (2002).
- Vaithianathan, Rhema. "Health insurance and imperfect competition in the health care market." Journal of health economics 25, no. 6 (2006): 1193-1202.
- Lewis, Geraint H., Rhema Vaithianathan, Peter M. Hockey, Guy Hirst, and James P. Bagian. "Counterheroism, common knowledge, and ergonomics: concepts from aviation that could improve patient safety." The Milbank Quarterly 89, no. 1 (2011): 4-38.
- Vaithianathan, Rhema, Tim Maloney, Emily Putnam-Hornstein, and Nan Jiang. "Children in the public benefit system at risk of maltreatment: Identification via predictive modeling." American Journal of Preventive Medicine 45, no. 3 (2013): 354-359.
- Lewis, G.H.; H. Kirkham, I. Duncan and R. Vaithianathan (2013) “How Health Systems Could Avert ‘Triple Fail’ Events That Are Harmful, Costly and Result In Poor Patient Satisfaction”, Health Affairs 32(4), 669-676.
- Lewis, G., Vaithianathan, R., Wright, L., Brice, M. R., Lovell, P., Rankin, S., & Bardsley, M. (2013). "Integrating care for high-risk patients in England using the virtual ward model: lessons in the process of care integration from three case sites". International journal of integrated care, 13.
- Vaithianathan, R., T. Maloney, N. Jiang and E. Putnam-Hornstein (2013) “Using Predictive Modelling to Identify Children in the Public Benefit System at High Risk of Substantiated Maltreatment” American Journal of Preventive Medicine
- ‘Lewis, G., R. Vaithianathan M. Bardsley, et al “How Well Are Virtual Wards Integrating Care for High-Risk Patients? A Three-Site Case Study”, International Journal of Integrated Care (2013)
- Linthicum, Mark T., Julia Thornton Snider, Rhema Vaithianathan, Yanyu Wu, Chris LaVallee, Darius N. Lakdawalla, Jennifer E. Benner, and Tomas J. Philipson. "Economic Burden of Disease-Associated Malnutrition in China." Asia-Pacific Journal of Public Health (2014)
- Dare, Tim, Rhema Vaithianathan, and Irene De Haan. "Addressing child maltreatment in New Zealand: is poverty reduction enough?" Educational Philosophy and Theory 46.9 (2014): 989-994.
- Ryan, Matthew, and Rhema Vaithianathan. "The Regulation of Direct‐to‐Consumer Advertising of Pharmaceuticals in a Managed Care Setting." Journal of Public Economic Theory 17.6 (2015): 986-1021
- Maloney, T., Putnam-Hornstein, E., Vaithianathan, R., Jiang, N., & Dalton, E. (2016). “Black–White Differences in Child Maltreatment Reports and Foster Care Placements: A Statistical Decomposition Using Linked Administrative Data”. Maternal and Child Health Journal
- Cuccaro-Alamin, S., Foust, R., Vaithianathan, R., & Putnam-Hornstein, E. (2017). “Risk assessment and decision making in child protective services: Predictive risk modelling in context”. Children and Youth Services Review 79
- Vaithianathan, R., Rouland, B., & Putnam-Hornstein, E. (2017). “Injury and Mortality Among Children Identified as at High Risk of Maltreatment”. Pediatrics 141(2).
- Rouland, B., & Vaithianathan, R. (2018). "Cumulative prevalence of maltreatment among New Zealand children, 1998–2015". American journal of public health, 108(4), 511-513.
- Reid, P., Paine, S. J., Te Ao, B., Willing, E., Wyeth, E., & Vaithianathan, R. (2018). "Estimating the economic costs of ethnic health inequities: Protocol for a prevalence-based cost-of-illness study in New Zealand (2003–2014)." BMJ Open, 8(6)
- Cheng, T., Li, J., & Vaithianathan, R. (2018). "Monthly Spending Dynamics of the Elderly Following a Health Shock: Evidence from Singapore". Health Economics.
- Lewis, G.H.; H. Kirkham, I. Duncan and R. Vaithianathan (2013) “How Health Systems Could Avert ‘Triple Fail’ Events That Are Harmful, Costly and Result In Poor Patient Satisfaction”, Health Affairs 32(4), 669-676.
- Cram, F., Vette, M., Wilson, M., Vaithianathan, R., Maloney, T., & Baird, S. (2018). "He awa whiria—braided rivers: Understanding the outcomes from Family Start for Maori". Evaluation Matters, 165-207.
- Vaithianathan, R., Hool, B., Hurd, M. D.,& Rohwedder, S. (2018). "High-frequency internet survey of a probability sample of older Singaporeans: The Singapore life panel". The Singapore Economic Review
