= Uma Lele =

Indian agricultural economist (born 1941)

- Born: 28 August 1941 (age 85); Koregaon, Satara, India
- Died: 28 July 2025 (aged 83)
- Education: Pune University, Cornell University
- Scientific career
- Workplaces: World Bank. Institute of Economic Growth

External videos
- "Uma Lele: Food for all: International organizations and the transformation of agriculture", Cornell 2022
- Responding to water scarcities – Keynote – Dr. Uma Lele, MIT Water Summit, 2020
- Does India have an agrarian crisis?, Uma Lele, IFPRI, 22 March 2019

Uma Lele (born 28 August 1941; Koregaon, Satara, India) was an agricultural economist, notably at the Institute of Economic Growth at the University of Delhi, India. She spent much of her career working with the World Bank and other international organizations.

Through her field research and work on operations, policy analysis, and evaluation, Lele assessed the impact of development assistance. She worked in areas around the world, including in China, India and Africa. Her work improved interventions, such as the World Bank's Forest Strategy (2002), and the work of CGIAR.

Lele was elected a Fellow of the Agricultural & Applied Economics Association in 1999. In July 2018 Uma Lele became president-elect of the International Association of Agricultural Economists. In 2021 she became their president (a three-year term), the first woman to hold that position.

== Early life and education ==
Uma Lele was born on 28 August 1941 in Koregaon, Satara, India and grew up in the state of Maharashtra. Her father was a lawyer and a judge. She completed her B.A. at Ferguson College, Pune University in 1960.

After marrying Jayant Lele, a PhD student at Cornell University, Uma Lele joined the master's program in the economics department at the University of Chicago. After a year working in Chicago with Theodore Schultz, she was able to transfer to Cornell, receiving a joint scholarship from the College of Agriculture (CALS) and the College of Arts and Sciences. Uma Lele earned her MS in 1963, and her PhD in 1965 from Cornell University in agricultural economics. She was the first woman to graduate from Cornell University with a PhD in applied economics.

== Career ==
After graduating, Lele lived in Canada and carried out field research in India on grain markets. In 1971, she was hired by the World Bank and began studying areas in South Asia and Africa. She worked on her book The Design of Rural Development: Lessons From Africa (1975) as a visiting professor at Cornell (1973–1974), returning to the World Bank in 1974 and remaining there until 1990.

In 1991 Lele become a graduate research professor and director of international studies at the University of Florida, where she spent four years (1991–1995). In addition she worked as the Director of the Global Development Initiative at the Carter Center from 1992 to 1993.

In 1995 Lele returned to the World Bank, where she became a senior advisor in the organization's Operations Evaluation Department (later the Independent Evaluation Group). In 2005 Lele retired from the World Bank. She continues to do research, write and lecture as a visiting researcher with the Institute of Economic Growth at the University of Delhi.

Lele has strongly supported the empowerment of women, helping to organize the First Global Conference for Women in Agriculture (GCWA) held in 2012. She has established a Mentor Fellowship Award for Women through the Agricultural & Applied Economics Association and a Best Research Award on Gender in Development through the International Association of Agricultural Economists.

== Research ==
Lele engaged in research, operations, policy analysis and evaluation with the World Bank and other international organizations including the FAO, CGIAR, IFAD, UNICEF, UNDP, Rockefeller Foundation and Bill & Melinda Gates Foundation. A recurring theme of Lele's work was her willingness to test the assumptions underlying public interventions against actual conditions and outcomes in the field. She led complex evaluations leading to the rethinking of major global development programs such as the World Bank's Forest Strategy (2002) and CGIAR (2003).

One of her first assignments at the World Bank was to study agricultural economics in Africa. At the time, leadership at the World Bank was strongly advocating for integrated rural development. Lele led the first comparative study to look at the design of rural development within Africa, and concluded that the bank's development approach was not effective in the African context, due to lack of infrastructure. In comparison, in countries like India, existing institutions were more stable and provided practical experience and support for the use of development funds. She recommended that projects needed "to build human and institutional development capacities" and to "build capacity before institutions could absorb large inflows of capital.” This work became the basis for her book The design of rural development : lessons from Africa (1975).

In this and in later work such as her comparisons of water-related policies in China and India, Lele emphasizes international diversity, the need to understand local conditions and suit interventions to circumstances Lele has also pointed out close links between agricultural sector performance and macroeconomic performance and examined the roles that donors play in the successes and failures of development.

As a Division Chief in the development research department, reorganized by Anne Osborn Krueger in the 1980s, Lele carried out a comparative study on aid to African agriculture. The MADIA (Managing Agricultural Development in Africa) discussion papers examine the effectiveness of liberalisation and privatisation attempts in agricultural marketing over 25 years by aid donors (the World Bank, USAID, UKODA, DANIDA, SIDA, France, Germany, and the EEC) in six African countries (Kenya, Malawi, Tanzania, Cameroon, Nigeria, and Senegal). Lele also independently published a book on aid and capital flows.

After Ismail Serageldin became leader of the World Bank in the 1990s, Lele became Deputy Division Chief of Agriculture, and Senior Advisor in the World Bank's Operations Evaluation Department (later called the Independent Evaluation Group). Lele led a meta-evaluation of CGIAR, the Consultative Group for International Agricultural Research. CGIAR had been created by Robert S. McNamara in the 1960s as a global public goods program. It had two major branches dealing with rice (International Rice Research Institute, IRRI), and wheat crops (International Maize and Wheat Improvement Center, CIMMYT). Lele examined the impact of CGIAR's programs in a comparative context with other global programs. This analysis led to the identification of changes that had occurred over time and a rethinking of CGIAR's role.

The Operations Evaluation Department was also asked to review the implementation of the World Bank's 1991 forest strategy policy. Lele carried out both a portfolio review of the Bank's activities, and case studies of countries which had tropical moist forests but had not worked with the Bank. Reports from forest-rich Brazil, Cameroon, and Indonesia and forest-poor China, Costa Rica, and India brought forward a range of perspectives. Her controversial recommendations led to changes in the organization's strategies for forest policy, to better co-ordinate conservation and poverty alleviation initiatives.

== Awards and honors ==
- 2019, Honorary Fellow. African Association of Agricultural Economists
- 2018, Clifton R. Wharton Jr. Emerging Markets Award, Charles H. Dyson School of Applied Economics and Management
- 2017, M. S. Swaminathan Award, Trust for Advancement of Agricultural Sciences, for “lifetime achievement in leadership in agriculture.”
- 2016–2017, B. P. Pal Memorial Award from the National Academy of Agricultural Sciences, India, for “singular outstanding overall contribution to agriculture”
- 2015, Honorary Life Member, International Association of Agricultural Economists
- 2014, Fellow, Indian Society of Agricultural Economics (ISAE)
- 2008, CALS Alumni Association Outstanding Alumni Award Recipients, Cornell University
- 1999, Fellow, American Agricultural Economic Association
- 1998, Fellow, National Academy of Agricultural Sciences, India
- 1995, Distinguished Scientist of Asian Origin, American Association of Agricultural Scientists of Indian Origin (AASIO)

== Selected publications ==
Lele has authored or edited at least 18 books and reports and over 130 book chapters, papers, and articles.

- Lele, Uma J. (1971). Food grain marketing in India; private performance and public policy. Ithaca [N.Y.]: Cornell University Press. ISBN 9780801406188.
- Lele, Uma J. (1975). The design of rural development : lessons from Africa. Baltimore: Published for the World Bank by Johns Hopkins University Press. ISBN 9780801817564.
- Lele, Uma J. (1989). Managing Agricultural Development in Africa : three articles on lessons from experience (PDF). Washington, D.C.: World Bank. ISBN 0-8213-1318-5.
- Forestry : the World Bank's experience. Washington, D.C.: Operations Evaluation Dept., World Bank. 1991. ISBN 0821319833.
- Lele, Uma; Kumar, Nalini; Husain, Syed Arif; Zazueta, Aaron; Kelly, Lauren (31 October 2000). The World Bank Forest Strategy. The World Bank. doi:10.1596/0-8213-4841-8. ISBN 978-0-8213-4841-3.
- Lele, Uma; Nabi, Ijaz, eds. (1991). Transitions in development : the role of aid and commercial flows : executive summary (PDF). San Francisco, CA: ICS Press. ISBN 1-55815-126-5. Archived from the original (PDF) on March 2, 2017.
- Lele, Uma; Lesser, William H.; Horstkotte-Wesseler, Ges, eds. (2000). Intellectual property rights in agriculture : the World Bank's role in assisting borrower and member countries. Washington, D.C.: World Bank. ISBN 082134496X.
- Lele, Uma; Husain, Syed Arif; Kumar, Nalini; Zazueta, Aaron; Kelly, Lauren (2000). The World Bank forest strategy : striking the right balance. Washington, D.C.: World Bank. ISBN 978-0821348413.
- Lele, Uma J. (2002). Managing a global resource : challenges of forest conservation and development. New Brunswick, N.J.: Transaction Publishers. ISBN 978-0765809407.
- Lele, Uma J.; Agarwal, Manmohan; Baldwin, Brian C.; Goswami, Sambuddha (2021). Food for All International Organizations and the Transformation of Agriculture. [S.l.]: OUP Premium. ISBN 978-0198755173.
