= Kelegama =

Kelegama is a surname. Notable people with the surname include:

- Jayantha Kelegama (1928–2005), Sri Lankan economist
- Saman Kelegama (1959–2017), Sri Lankan economist, son of Jayantha Kelegama
