= Jill McCluskey =

American economist

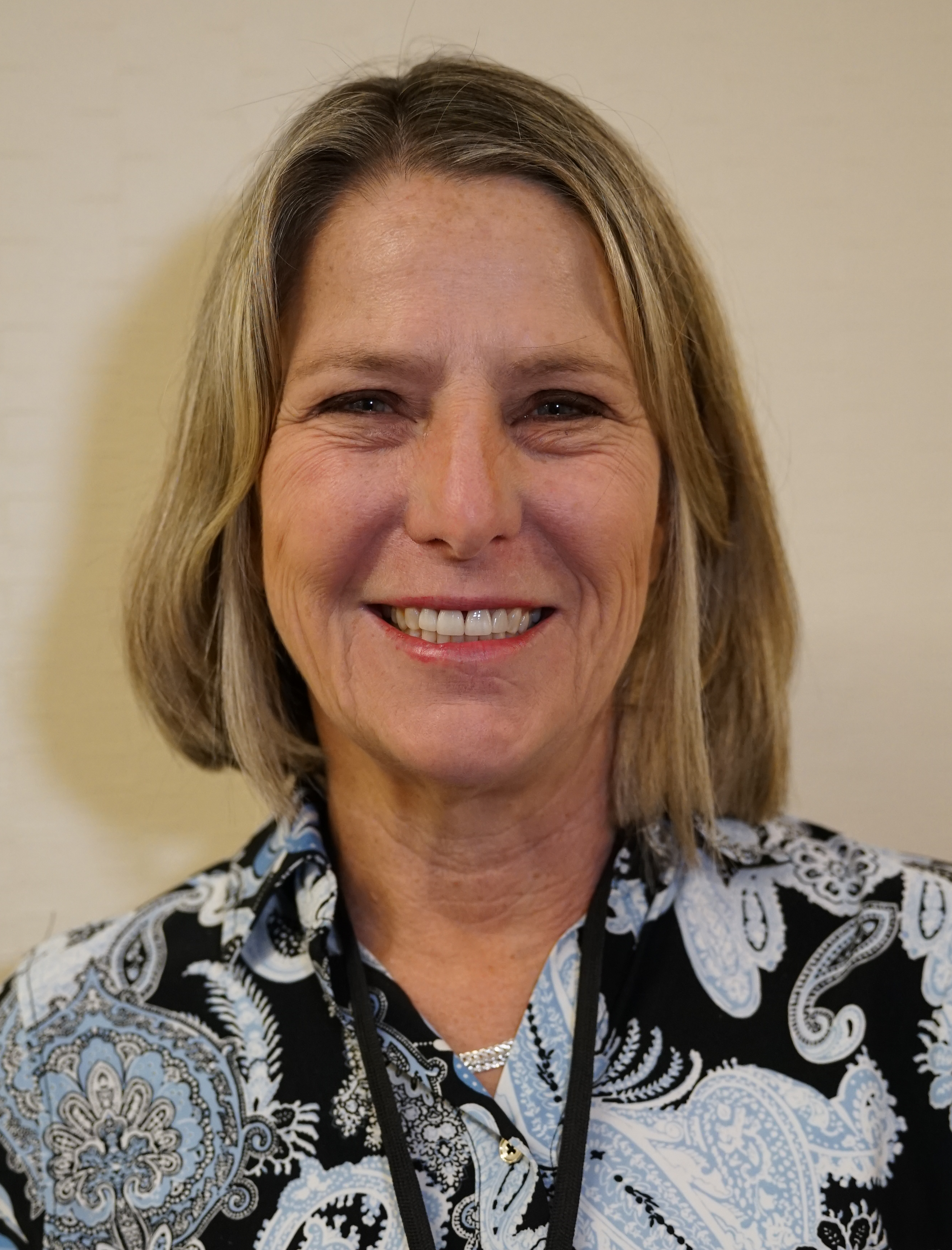
- McCluskey at ASSA 2026

Academic background
- Education: BA, Business Economics and Political Science, 1989, University of California, Santa Barbara; MA, economics, 1993, Georgetown University; MA, PhD, 1998, University of California, Berkeley
- Thesis: Environmental contamination and compensation (1998)

Jill Jennifer McCluskey is an American economist. She is a Regents Professor and Director of the School of Economic Sciences at Washington State University.

== Early life and education ==
McCluskey completed her Bachelor of Arts degree in Business Economics and Political Science in 1989 at the University of California, Santa Barbara before completing her Master's degree in economics at Georgetown University. Following this, she enrolled at the University of California, Berkeley for her Master of Science degree and PhD in agricultural and resource economics.

== Career ==
Following her PhD, McCluskey joined the faculty at Washington State University in 1998. During her early tenure, she taught industrial organization and microeconomic theory including the economics of food quality and labeling, firm incentives, and consumer perceptions and behavior. Outside of the institution, she served as director of the Agricultural & Applied Economics Association (AAEA) from 2005 to 2008 and Chaired the Food and Agricultural Marketing Policy Section. In 2010, McCluskey became the principal investigator on a study aimed at researching partner accommodation policies on recruitment, retention, and promotion of female faculty at WSU. Later, she was appointed chair of graduate studies in the WSU School of Economic Sciences before being elected president of the AAEA from 2014 to 2017. In 2018, after concluding her term as AAEA president, McCluskey was named a Fellow of the AAEA for her research, teaching, service, and leadership.

In 2017, McCluskey joined the National Academy of Sciences’s Board on Agriculture and Natural Resources (BANR) to provide advice on requests and inquiries from Congress, federal, and state agencies and identify frontiers of science and policy in the food, agricultural, and natural resources system. In 2023, she was appointed the Chair of the Board of Agriculture and Natural Resources. She is the first female and economist to serve as the Chair of BANR.

In 2019, she was also recognized by WSU for her "ground-breaking research in economic incentives, product quality and reputation, consumer acceptance of technology, and women in STEM fields" by being named a University Regents Professor, the highest honor bestowed onto faculty. McCluskey then became the first female Director of WSU's School of Economic Sciences by replacing outgoing director H. Alan Love in 2019. At the same time, she was elected a Fellow of the Western Agricultural Economics Association and named an editor of the American Journal of Agricultural Economics.

In 2021, McCluskey was elected a Fellow of the American Association for the Advancement of Science for her contributions to research and leadership in the areas of food labeling, food quality, and product reputation.

In 2024, McCluskey became the President Elect of the International Association of Agricultural Economists.

== Personal life ==
McCluskey is married to Matthew McCluskey, Westinghouse professor in the Department of Physics & Astronomy at WSU. They have a son Ryan McCluskey (1999-). After their daughter Lauren (1997–2018) was murdered on campus at the University of Utah, they established the Lauren McCluskey Foundation, a non-profit organization to fund research and education programs centered around making college campuses safer.

== Selected publications ==
- Modern Agricultural and Resource Economics and Policy: Essays in Honor of Gordon C. Rausser
- New Technology and Conflicting Information: Assessing Consumers’ Willingness to Pay for New Foods
- The Economics of Reputation
