= Nkechi Owoo =

Ghanaian female economist and academic

Nkechi Srodah Owoo (Onuoha) is Ghanaian economist and academic serving as a professor of Economics at the University of Ghana. Her research is focused on poverty and inequality, health and demographic economics, gender economics and climate change in developing countries, especially in Sub-saharan Africa.

Owoo has collaborated with international institutions, such as the World Bank, International Labor Organization and Food and Agricultural Organization, and has gained recognition for her contribution in development economics and policy research.

In 2025, she became the first woman to be promoted into full professorship in economics at the University of Ghana, making a significant milestone breakthrough in the institution's history.

== Early life ==
Owoo was born into a family of medical doctors where she was encouraged to follow suite. Although she considered medicine, she later discovered her comparative advantage lay elsewhere. Through the encouragement of her grandfather, Bossoh Kpohanu who had studied economics himself, provided an alternative for her, since he had made a fulfilling career as a results. Prof. Owoo had her first encounter to the subject in high school and become fascinated by its simple logic which made sense and could relate to the various concepts taught. Her interest deepened through undergraduate and graduate studies where she admired the deliberateness of assumptions and the predictability of the conclusions that characterized economic analysis.

== Education ==
Owoo enrolled in the University of Ghana, Legon, where she obtained her Bachelor of Arts in Economic graduating with First Class Honors in 2006. She later pursued her graduate studies at Clark University in Worcester, Massachusetts in the United States, and earned her Master's degree in Economics in 2009. She continued at Clark University to obtain her doctoral studies, with her research focusing on microeconomic issues in developing countries, with interest in household behavior, health, agriculture and gender dynamics. She completed her Doctor of Philosophy (PhD) in Economics in 2012.

== Career ==
Owoo joined the Department of Economics at the University of Ghana as a lecturer and later rose through the academic ranks to become professor. She teaches undergraduate courses in microeconomics and macroeconomics, and graduate courses in health economics and applied econometrics.
