= Economy of Galicia =

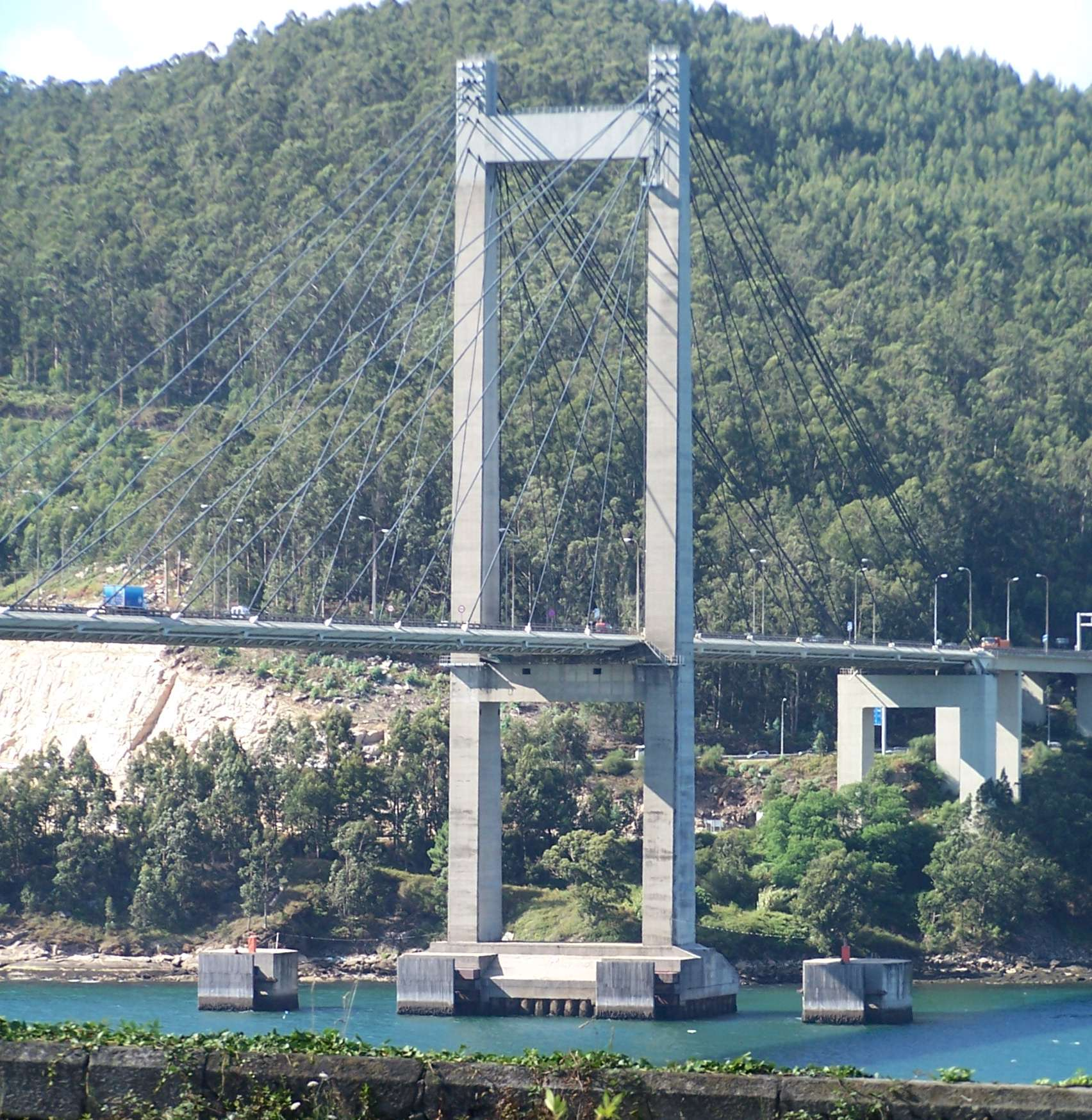
Rande Bridge

Galicia's two major economic poles are A Coruña and Vigo, with A Coruña in the lead, producing an estimated 33.2% of VAT receipts against 24.3% from Vigo. A third economic center is Santiago de Compostela, capital of Galicia. Other important cities are Ferrol and Pontevedra. In recent years the distance has grown between the interior provinces, Lugo and Ourense, which are more rural and less developed, and the coastal provinces, Pontevedra and A Coruña, particularly the areas situated along the axis of the A-9 Highway.

There is also a growing economic sector in Fair Trade and alternative economy.

== Background ==
Galicia is the fifth largest autonomous region in Spain by area, with its own language, and cultural traditions which, like Catalonia and the Basque Country, set it apart from the rest of Spain.

== Development in the 20th century ==
Francisco Franco was born in Galicia, however during the Civil War and the Francoist dictatorship (1936-1975) his government banned all regional languages (including Galician) from public use. During those years the region was neglected by the central government and lagged behind other regions during the Spanish miracle of the 1960s and 1970s.

== Contemporary economy ==
Today, Galicia is a producer and manufacturer of several goods, including automobiles, ships, fashion garments and timber. Vigo produces 17% of all the automobiles manufactured in Spain. The port of Vigo is also important for shipping and seafood exports. Galician productivity of timber stands at 207.95 m3/k2.

== Local related books ==
- Guisan, Maria-Carmen: Galicia 2000. Industria y empleo. University of Santiago de Compostela, Spain. Free on line at: http://www.usc.es/economet/galicia.htm,
- Prada Blanco, Albino y Lago Peñas, Santiago (2009): "Galicia, unha economía europea 1986-2006", Vigo, Editorial Galaxia
- Prada Blanco, Albino (coord.) (2007): "Globalización, competencia e deslocalización. Perspectivas dende Galicia", Santiago, Xunta de Galicia, https://web.archive.org/web/20140309112634/http://webs.uvigo.es/aprada/pdfs/Globalizacion%20competencia%20deslocalizacion.pdf
- Prada Blanco, Albino (2004): "Economía de Galicia. Situación actual y perspectivas", Santiago, tresCtres
- Prada Blanco, Albino (1999): "Economía de Galicia", Vigo, Edicións Xerais de Galicia

== See also ==
- History of Galicia
