= Paul Kukubo =

Kenyan businessman

- Education: University of Nairobi; United States International University
- Occupation: Businessman

Paul Kukubo is a Kenyan businessman and Chief Executive Officer of the Kenya ICT Board. He started the first interactive agency in East Africa, 3mice Interactive. Kukubo held senior roles in Marketing and Advertising; including a Directorship at McCann-Erickson Kenya, before co-founding the technology firm, 3mice Interactive Ltd.

He was the Chairman of the Marketing Society of Kenya, where he led the Brand Kenya initiative.

== Education ==
Kukubo holds a Bachelor of Arts Degree in Economics and Sociology (Hons) from the University of Nairobi. In 2011, he graduated with a Global Executive Masters of Business Administration (GEMBA) from United States International University, Africa (USIA-A) in partnership with Columbia Business School.

== Other Achievements ==
Kukubo is a director in various Organizations in Kenya which includes the positions of Non-executive Director and Co-Founder of 3mice Interactive Ltd; and Non-executive Director, Kenya School of Professional Studies.

He is married with two children.
