= Ramon Casadesus-Masanell =

Spanish-American economist

Ramon Casadesus-Masanell is a Spanish-American economist currently the Herman C. Krannert Professor of Business Administration at the Harvard Business School. He is co-editor, with Daniel F. Spulber, of the Journal of Economics & Management Strategy.

Ramon is also a prolific case writer and was placed among the top 40 case authors consistently, since the list was first published in 2016 by The Case Centre. He ranked 17th In 2018/19, 27th in 2017/18, 35th in 2016/17 and 38th in 2015/16.
