= Sure =

Sure may refer to:

- Seemingly unrelated regressions
- Series of Unsurprising Results in Economics (SURE), an economics academic journal
- Support to mitigate unemployment risks in an emergency (SURE), an EU programme
- Sure, as probability, see certainty
- Sure (brand), a brand of antiperspirant deodorant
- Sure (company), a telecommunications company operating in British Crown Dependencies and Overseas Territories
- Stein's unbiased risk estimate (SURE), in estimation theory
- Suhre river, Switzerland
- Sauer river, a tributary of the Moselle

== In music ==
- "Sure" (Every Little Thing song), from the album Eternity
- "Sure" (Take That song), from the album Nobody Else

== See also ==
- Shure
