= Journal of Economics & Management Strategy =

- Discipline: Economics, management
- Language: English
- Edited by: Daniel F. Spulber and Ramon Casadesus-Masanell

Publication details
- History: 1992-present
- Publisher: John Wiley & Sons
- Frequency: Quarterly
- Impact factor: 1.871 (2020)

Standard abbreviations
- ISO 4: J. Econ. Manag. Strategy

Indexing
- ISSN: 1058-6407 (print); 1530-9134 (web)
- LCCN: 92640643
- OCLC no.: 610452185

Links
- Journal homepage; Online access; Online archive

The Journal of Economics & Management Strategy is a quarterly peer-reviewed academic journal published by John Wiley & Sons. The founding editor-in-chief is Daniel F. Spulber (Kellogg School of Management, Northwestern University) and Ramon Casadesus-Masanell (Harvard Business School). The journal was established in 1992.

== Abstracting and indexing ==
The journal is abstracted and indexed in:

- ABI/INFORM
- American Business Law Journal
- CSA Environmental Sciences & Pollution Management Database
- Current Contents/Social & Behavioral Sciences
- EconLit
- International Bibliography of the Social Sciences
- RePEc
- Social Sciences Citation Index

According to the Journal Citation Reports, the journal has a 2020 impact factor of 1.871.
