= Agrekon =

- Discipline: Economics Agricultural economics
- Language: English
- Edited by: Johann Kirsten

Publication details
- History: 1962–present
- Publisher: Taylor & Francis (United States)
- Frequency: Quarterly
- Impact factor: 0.224 (2016)

Standard abbreviations
- ISO 4: Agrekon

Indexing
- ISSN: 0303-1853 (print); 2078-0400 (web)
- OCLC no.: 643133728

Links
- Journal homepage; Online access; Online access (Africa); Online archive

Agrekon is a quarterly peer-reviewed academic journal concentrating on Food, Agricultural and Resource Economics vis-a-vis to Southern Africa. It is edited by Professor Johann Kirsten, an economics Professor at Stellenbosch University and a director at the Bureau of Economic Research. Agrekon is the official publication of the Agricultural Economics Association of South Africa (AEASA), the professional body of South African Agricultural economists. It is published by Taylor & Francis.
