= Rivista Internazionale di Scienze Sociali =

Italian economic journal

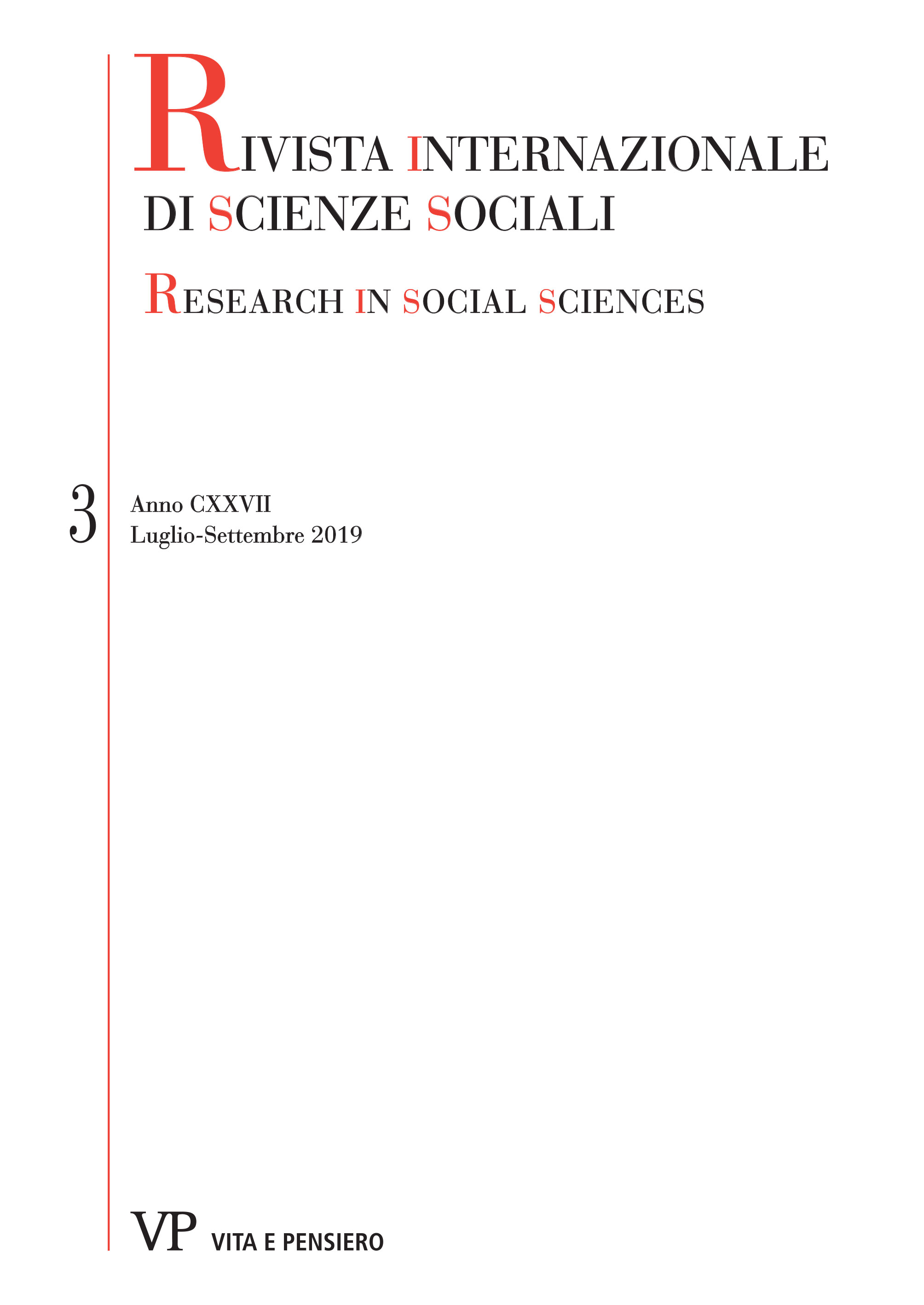
- Discipline: Social sciences
- Language: Italian; English
- Edited by: Maurizio Baussola

Publication details
- History: 1893–present
- Publisher: Vita e Pensiero (Italy)
- Frequency: Quarterly

Standard abbreviations
- ISO 4: Riv. Int. Sci. Soc.

Indexing
- ISSN: 0035-676X (print); 1827-7918 (web)

Links
- Journal homepage

Rivista Internazionale di Scienze Sociali (RISS; English title: Research In Social Sciences), established in 1893, is the oldest Italian academic journal in economics and social sciences.

The journal promotes research and scientific debate in the field of social sciences, stimulates theoretical and empirical interdisciplinary discussion, and provides insights on the most relevant, critical and controversial policy issues. All research articles submitted to RISS undergo blind peer reviewing.

RISS is indexed in SCOPUS, RePEc, JEL and available on JSTOR.

Its website contains every article published since 1934.

== Approach ==
RISS accepts contributions from scholars of multiple backgrounds (including economics, management, political science, philosophy, anthropology, and sociology, and various methodological approaches. It intends to offer a better understanding of the structure and dynamics of different societies and economies, aimed at supporting effective and innovative policies.

Since its beginning the journal published papers written in Italian. From 1991, it started publishing articles written in English as well, and gradually welcomed more and more contributions from international scholars. Thanks to the cooperation with "Giordano Dell'Amore" Observatory On The Relationship Between Law and Economics the review to published a number of selected papers, presented at the international workshops organised by the Observatory, with a focus on "Law and Economics". Information and privacy issues together with the technological, environmental and economic controversies related to the European unification process, were discussed on various issues of RISS and proposed at the attention of researchers and policymakers.

RISS also devote its attention on the economic conditions of Italy, and publishes special issues on the Italian economy and the impact of the Great Recession in a historical perspective.

== History ==
=== Founding and early history ===
RISS was founded on January 1, 1893, as the publication of Unione Cattolica per gli Studi Sociali in Italia (Catholic Union for Social Studies in Italy), which in May 1890 set out to establish clubs, found a secondary school and launch a social studies periodical for "advocating the restoration of a social order inspired by Christian values". The Journal, within the Catholic movement, aimed to disseminate the principles of Christian morals upon which to found a renewed social order. The objective was to create a system of thought that reflected the Christian principles and the social teachings of Pope Leo XIII, able to tackling the widespread diffusion of capitalistic and socialistic ideologies.

The Journal's agenda, published in the first issue and signed by its editors, Salvatore Talamo and Giuseppe Toniolo, addressed the topics propounded by the Union: "illustrating the value of a social order inspired by Christian values, and following the marvellous progress of the ideas and works realised all over the world today, under the guidance of the Roman Pontiff, for the purpose of fully making again alive that social order". It also expressed an intention to present and discuss scientific ideas and doctrines, to describe and analyze facts and institutions, and to accomplish this project in the broadest possible scope, inviting contributions from both Italian and foreign authors and maintaining a constant link between the development of social thought and the Magisterium.

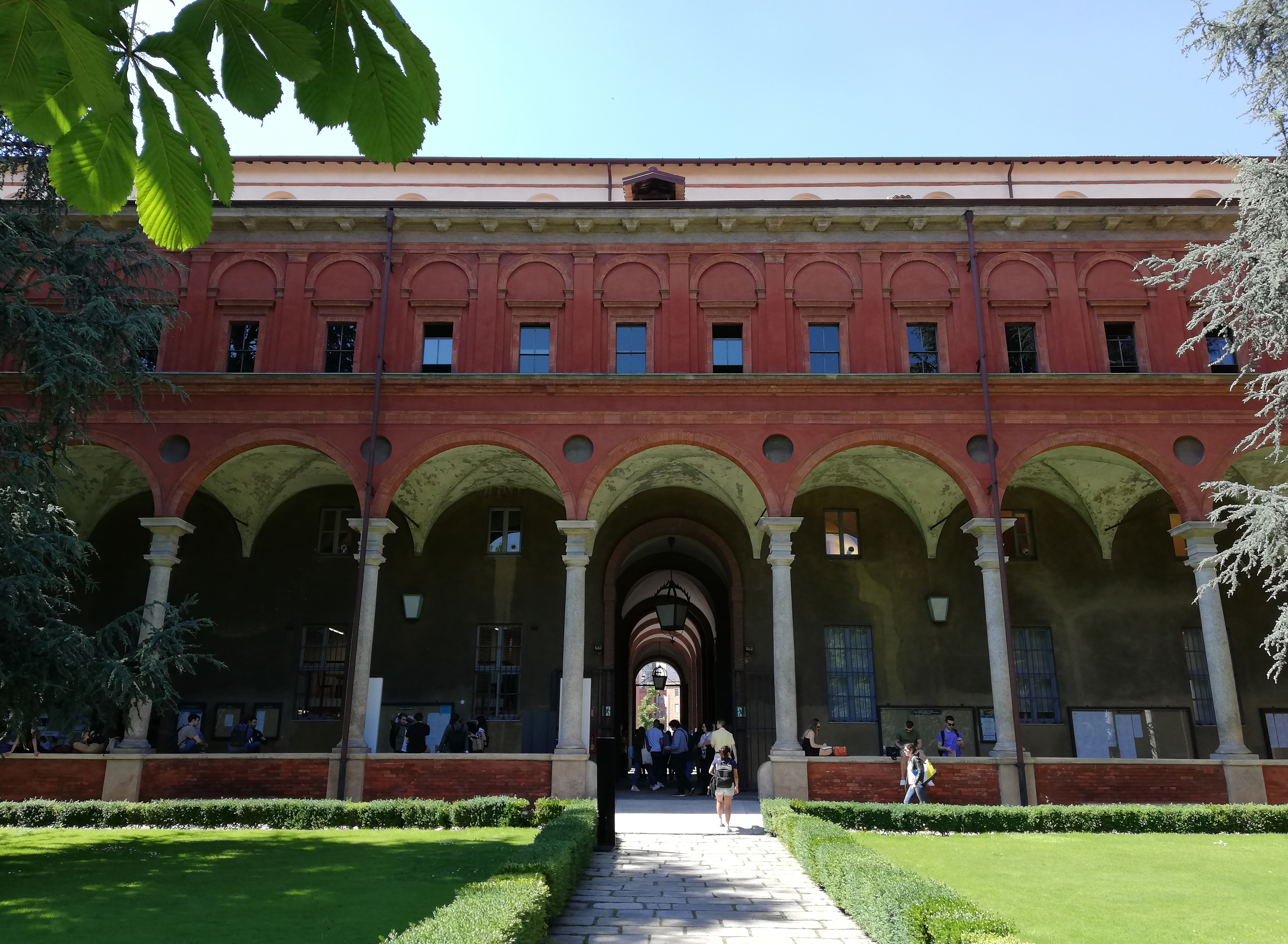
Università Cattolica del Sacro Cuore of Milan

Besides furthering an operational programme, the Journal was determined to place at its core the formulation of a message of "public philosophy", a "moral doctrine on social facts" based on the centrality of man and the search for criteria upon which to construct relationships among human beings as well as between humans and their surroundings.

Each monthly issue was divided in three sections. The first was dedicated to scientific articles. The Journal's significant reputation was shaped over the first twenty years of publication by a stable group of contributors, which included prominent personalities like Giuseppe Toniolo, Luigi Caissotti di Chiusano, Filippo Ermini, Salvatore Talamo, Giuseppe Tuccimei, Giovanni Rossignoli, Ercole Agliardi, Igino Petrone, Luigi Olivi, Giuseppe Tomassetti, Giovanni Carano-Donvito, Angelo Mauri. A third of the articles addressed social and civic questions and many dealt with labour-related problems. Examining the key social and legislative issues associated with protecting workers rights and promoting their role in the economic system was both a direct response to pleas in the Rerum Novarum and an assumption of responsibility towards those suffering the most serious consequences of the "social question" firstly highlighted by Pope Leo XIII. Several articles on economic activities, as well as broader speculative essays (regarding philosophy, politics, history, sociology, psychology and biology) were included.

In 1927, Rivista Internazionale di Scienze Sociali e Discipline Ausiliarie became the economic scientific Journal of Università Cattolica del Sacro Cuore of Milan, published by Vita e Pensiero. Its first director, the Dean of the University itself, Father Agostino Gemelli, and Pio Bondioli, who first assisted him and then editor for three consecutive years, from 1930 to 1932, embraced the legacy of its founders. This commitment was also upheld by their successors: Amintore Fanfani, editor from 1933 to 1945 and successively Italian Prime Minister after World War II (in 1934, the publication changed its name to Rivista Internazionale di Scienze Sociali) and Francesco Vito, editor until his death in 1968.

The Journal was also an independent, critical voice, to this day still historically relevant, in the debates on the concept of "state-led economy" and the imperfections of the competitive market, through the essays by Francesco Vito and Amintore Fanfani. An interest in the theory of economic cycles and economic development, particularly as applied to underdeveloped areas and international relations, was one of its distinctive features in the 1940s and 1950s.

=== Recent history ===
Giancarlo Mazzocchi became the Journal's editor-in-chief in 1968 and worked with members of the Istituto di Scienze Economiche Francesco Vito, at Università Cattolica.

From 1991 RISS started publishing articles written in English, and gradually welcomed more and more contributions from international scholars.

From 2017 Maurizio Baussola is Editor-in-chief of RISS following Luigi Campiglio who headed the journal from 2005 to 2017.
