= Ki-Hang Kim =

Korean-American mathematician (1936–2009)

- 김기항(金基恒)
- Born: August 5, 1936; Anju, South Pyongan, Korea, Empire of Japan
- Died: January 15, 2009 (aged 72); Montgomery, Alabama, USA
- Other names: Kim Ki-Hang Butler, Hang Kim, Keyhany Keem, Kim Ki-Hang
- Education: University of Southern Mississippi (B.S. 1960, M.S. 1961); George Washington University (Ph.D 1971)
- Occupations: Mathematician, Professor
- Years active: 1970–2006
- Employers: University of Hartford (1961–1966); St. Mary's College (1966–1971); Pembroke State University (1971–1974); University of Alabama (1974–2007)
- Spouse: Myong Kim (married 1963)
- Children: 2; Linda Kim (actress)
- Honours: Distinguished Professor of Mathematics; Honorary Alabama Colonel (1996)

Ki-Hang Kim (Korean: 김기항; 5 August 1936 – 15 January 2009), also known as Kim Ki-Hang Butler, Hang Kim, Keyhany Keem, or Kim Ki-Hang was a Korean-American Mathematician and Alabama State University professor known for his contributions in semigroups, Boolean matrices, and Social Sciences. He frequently co-wrote with Fred Roush.

== Personal life ==
Kim was born in Anju, Korea, Empire of Japan (now in North Korea) the eldest son of independent farmers Jin Gyong Kim and Mayhryn Hong. A bright child, by 12 years old Kim was capable of speaking some Japanese, Chinese, English and Russian, and had skipped some grades of school; by 14, he was acting as an interpreter for US troops in Korea during the Korean War. In 1950, Kim's region was held by the South Korean and American army. When the North Koreans and Chinese returned, Kim was given six hours to decide whether to take an empty U.S. Air Force seat, and go South with the US Army, which he accepted upon the urging of his father. He didn't see his family again for 30 years. He went to Taegu Airbase, and in 1952 passed the qualifying English exams, securing him the job of interpreter for Colonel Decatur Poindexter Butler. At the war's end, Butler took Kim to the US, for a better education. On 25 November 1954, Kim began the paperwork to immigrate to the US permanently, in order to join the US air force. In 1955, Kim enlisted in the US Army to reduce stress on the Butler family by utilising the G.I. Bill to pay for his further education. He was discharged in 1956. He received US citizenship in 1960.

Kim married Myong Ja Hwang on 31 July 1963. They had two children together one of whom is the actress Linda Kim. In 1981, Kim returned to North Korea, reuniting with his family for the first time in 30 years. Kim was also active in the Korean-American community, acting as the first president of the Montgomery Korean-American Association and was a member of the Korean-American Methodist Church.

In 1996, Kim was awarded an Honorary Alabama Colonel for his outstanding leadership in the field of mathematics. He was also recognised in the 1972 edition of "Personalities of the South."

According to long-time collaborator Fred Roush, there was a period of time where Kim was a bodybuilder. His Erdős number is 2.

== Education and career ==
Kim graduated from the University of Southern Mississippi in 1960 with a B.S. in mathematics. He received a M.S. a year later, in 1961. Unable to fund a Ph.D., Kim taught briefly at University of Hartford. He then obtained a Ph.D. in mathematics from George Washington University in 1970, for On (0,1)-Matrix Semigroups.

Kim began teaching at St. Mary's College in 1968, moving to Pembroke State University in 1971. Finally, he accepted the position of professor of mathematics and Director of the Mathematics Research Group at Alabama State University. Kim additionally taught at institutions abroad, in Portugal and India, as well as attending many international conferences, including those in China and Hungary, particularly the conference on Algebraic Semigroup Theory in Szeged, Hungary, where he was the only American invited. He was also active in many conferences within the US, including the American Mathematical Society meeting at Auburn University in 1971, Southeastern Conference on Combinatorics, Graph Theory, Computing in Boca Raton, Florida in 1974. Kim spent 35 years teaching at Alabama State University, ending his tenure in 2007.

From 1971 to 1976, Kim published 25 papers on semigroups and Boolean matrices (under the name Kim Butler). Following meeting fellow mathematician Fred Roush, Kim published over 150 more papers over a variety of subjects. He is remembered for bridging the gap between social sciences, particularly economics, psychology, and political sciences. In 1980, he launched and became editor of Mathematical Social Sciences, focusing on Game Theory and Social Choice Theory. Kim also disproved an established theorem dictating the way computer coding was written. Kim wrote seven books, most co-authored by Roush.

== Publications and books ==
Listed below are some early works by Kim, published under Kim Butler:

- Butler, K.KH. "On Kim's conjecture." Semigroup Forum 2, 281 (1971).
- Butler, K.KH. (1971). "Binary relations." In: Capobianco, M., Frechen, J.B., Krolik, M. (eds) Recent Trends in Graph Theory. vol 186. Springer, Berlin, Heidelberg.
- Butler, K.KH. "On a miller and clifford theorem." Semigroup Forum 3, 92–94 (1971).
- Butler, K.KH. "On (0,1)-matrix semigroups." Semigroup Forum 3, 74–79 (1971).
- Butler, K.KH. (1972). "The number of partial order graphs." In: Alavi, Y., Lick, D.R., White, A.T. (eds) Graph Theory and Applications. Lecture Notes in Mathematics, vol 303. Springer, Berlin, Heidelberg.
- Butler, K.KH. "Straddles and splits on semigroups." Acta Mathematica Academiae Scientiarum Hungaricae 24, 113–114 (1973).
- Butler, K.KH. "Canonical bijection betweenD of (0, 1)-matrix semigroupsof (0, 1)-matrix semigroups." Period. Math. Hung. 4, 303–305 (1973).
- Butler, K.KH. (1974). "A moore-penrose inverse for boolean relation matrices." In: Holton, D.A. (eds) Combinatorial Mathematics. Lecture Notes in Mathematics, vol 403. Springer, Berlin, Heidelberg.
- Butler, K.KH. (1974). "Subgroups of binary relations." In: Newman, M.F. (eds) Proceedings of the Second International Conference on The Theory of Groups. Lecture Notes in Mathematics, vol 372. Springer, Berlin, Heidelberg.
- Ki-Hang Butler, K. "Combinatorial properties of binary semigroups." Period. Math. Hung. 5, 3–46 (1974).
- Butler, K.KH. "The semigroup of hall relations." Semigroup Forum 9, 253–260 (1974).

Over 150 later works can be found here, published under Ki Hang Kim.

Additionally, Kim wrote seven books, reviews of which can be found here. They are titled as follows:

- Lecture notes on (0,1)-matrices (1973)
- Mathematics for social scientists (1980) with F W Roush.
- Introduction to mathematical consensus theory (1980) with F W Roush.
- Boolean matrix theory and applications (1982)
- Applied abstract algebra (1983) with F W Roush.
- Competitive economics. Equilibrium and arbitration (1983) with F W Roush.
- Incline algebra and applications (1984) with Z Q Cao and F W Roush.
- Team theory (1987) with F W Roush
