= International Association of Agricultural Economists =

International professional organization for agricultural economists

- Founded: 1929
- Founder: Leonard Knight Elmhirst
- Type: 501(c)(6) organization
- Purpose: Sharing information about Agricultural economics
- President: Uma Lele
- Website: iaae-agecon.org

The International Association of Agricultural Economists (IAAE) is an International professional organization for agricultural economists. IAAE publishes the peer-reviewed journal Agricultural Economics. The flagship conference of the International Association of Agricultural Economists (IAAE), the International Conference of Agricultural Economists (ICAE), is held every three years.

Although founded in England in 1929, the Association was only formally incorporated as a 501(c)(6) organization in the US as of 2012, as the "International Association of Agricultural Economists, Inc". The related "Fund for the International Conference of Agricultural Economics" was registered as a 501(c)(3) organization in the US in 1960, to offer support for travel and registration costs to the triennial conference.

== History ==
The International Association of Agricultural Economists was formed in 1929 as a result of meetings organized by Leonard Knight Elmhirst and Carl Edwin Ladd. These were in part a response to the agricultural depression of the 1920s, following World War I. The meetings were hosted by Elmhirst and his wife, heiress Dorothy Payne Whitney, at their home Dartington Hall in Devon, England.

Elmhirst's first conference at Dartington Hall in 1929 was followed by a second conference at his alma mater, Cornell University, USA, in 1930. International travel for many of the attendees was subsidized with the help of the Carnegie Endowment and the General Education Board of the Rockefeller Foundation. At the 1930 conference, what was then known as the International Conference of Agricultural Economists (ICAE) adopted a constitution and agreed to publish proceedings for each meeting. Leonard Elmhirst served as the president of the new organization from 1929 to 1958, and was subsequently designated as the "founder president" (1959-1974). George F. Warren (USA) and Max Sering (Germany) were the first co-vice presidents.

Subsequent conferences were held at Bad Eilsen, Germany (1934), St. Andrews, Scotland (1936) and Macdonald College, Sainte-Anne-de-Bellevue, Quebec, Canada (1938). Eleven countries were represented in 1929 (Canada, China, Denmark, Finland, Germany, New Zealand, Norway, South Africa, Trinidad, the United Kingdom and the United States), thirty in 1930, and nineteen in 1934. Organizers planned to hold a sixth conference in Hungary in 1941, but the next conference did not occur until 1947, after World War II.

In 1961, at the Eleventh International Conference of Agricultural Economists in Mexico, the name of the organization was officially changed to "International Association of Agricultural Economists" (IAAE), with the name "International Conference of Agricultural Economists" (ICAE) being retained for the actual conference.

The organization supported publication of the multi-volume World Atlas of Agriculture (1969-1976), collecting together text, maps, charts, and statistics about hundreds of countries. "The first complete coverage of world land-use patterns on a uniform basis and on a large scale", it was described as "a massive contribution to our knowledge of land-use patterns". Decades later, the World Atlas of Agriculture was used to create the Historical Land Use Database 1960 (HISLU60). The HISLU60 digital database provides an important baseline for historical European land-use and has been used to analyze European land cover trends, revealing dramatic overall changes over time.

At the Nineteenth International Conference of Agricultural Economists in Málaga, Spain, in 1985, the founding of the journal Agricultural Economics: The Journal of the International Association of Agricultural Economists was announced. The first issue of Agricultural Economics was published in 1986 by Blackwell Publishing in Oxford.

The first woman to become president of the International Association of Agricultural Economists was Uma Lele. Lele became president-elect in July 2018, and president in August 2021. She is also the first woman to receive a PhD in Applied Economics from Cornell University.

IAAE recognizes outstanding contributions in the field of agricultural economics through a number of awards. Receiving an IAAE Honorary Life Membership is the equivalent of becoming a Fellow in other professional associations.
