= Journal of Emerging Market Finance =

- Discipline: Financial economics & management
- Language: English
- Edited by: G. Balasubramanian

Publication details
- History: 2002-present
- Publisher: Sage Publications India Pvt Ltd
- Frequency: Triannually
- Impact factor: 1.2

Standard abbreviations
- ISO 4: J. Emerg. Mark. Finance

Indexing
- ISSN: 0972-6527 (print); 0973-0710 (web)
- OCLC no.: 179698713

Links
- Journal homepage; Online access; Online archive

The Journal of Emerging Market Finance is a triannual peer-reviewed academic journal covering the theory and practice of finance in emerging markets. The journal was established in 2002 and is published tri-annually by SAGE Publications. The editor-in-chief is G. Balasubramanian (Institute for Financial Management and Research).

== Abstracting and indexing ==
The journal is abstracted and indexed in:

- Australian Business Deans Council (ABDC)
- CABELLS Journalytics
- Chartered Association of Business Schools (CABS)
- DeepDyve
- Dutch-KB
- EconLit
- Emerging Sources Citation Index
- International Bibliography of the Social Sciences
- ProQuest databases
- Research Papers in Economics
- Scopus
- EBSCO
- Indian Citation Index (ICI)
- J-Gate
- OCLC
- Ohio
- Portico
- Pro-Quest-RSP
- ProQuest-Illustrata
- UGC-CARE (GROUP II)
