= Mathematical Social Sciences =

- Discipline: Economics, social science, mathematics
- Language: English
- Edited by: Emel Filiz-Ozbay, Juan Moreno-Ternero

Publication details
- History: 1980–present
- Publisher: Elsevier
- Frequency: Bimonthly
- Impact factor: 0.5 (2023)

Standard abbreviations
- ISO 4: Math. Soc. Sci.
- MathSciNet: Math. Social Sci.

Indexing
- CODEN: MSOSDD
- ISSN: 0165-4896
- OCLC no.: 07346213

Links
- Journal homepage; Online archive

Mathematical Social Sciences is a peer-reviewed mathematics journal in the field of social science, in particular economics. The journal covers research on mathematical modelling in fields such as economics, psychology, political science, and other social sciences, including individual decision making and preferences, decisions under risk, collective choice, voting, theories of measurement, and game theory.

It was established in 1980 and is published by Elsevier. The editors-in-chief have been Ki Hang Kim (1980-1983), Hervé Moulin (1983-2004), Jean-François Laslier (2005-2016), Simon Grant, Christopher Chambers (2009-2020), Yusufcan Masatlioglu (2020-2021), Juan Moreno-Ternero (2017-) and Emel Filiz-Ozbay (2021-).

== See also ==
- List of scholarly journals in economics
