= South Asia Economic Journal =

- Discipline: Economics
- Language: English
- Edited by: Saman Kelegama and Prabir De

Publication details
- History: 2001
- Publisher: SAGE Publications (India)
- Frequency: Bi-annual

Standard abbreviations
- ISO 4: South Asia Econ. J.

Indexing
- ISSN: 1391-5614 (print); 0973-077X (web)

Links
- Journal homepage; Online access; Online archive

South Asia Economic Journal is a blind peer-reviewed journal that provides a forum to discuss South Asia's position on global economic issues, its relations with other regional groupings and its response to global developments.

It is published twice a year by SAGE Publications in association with Institute of Policy Studies of Sri Lanka and Research and Information System for Developing Countries.

Sri Lankan economist Saman Kelegama co-edits the journal.

== Abstracting and indexing ==
South Asia Economic Journal is abstracted and indexed in:

- Australian Business Deans Council
- DeepDyve
- Dutch-KB
- EBSCO
- ICI
- J-Gate
- OCLC
- Ohio
- PAIS International – ProQuest
- Portico
- ProQuest-Illustrata
- Pro-Quest-RSP
- Research Papers in Economics (RePEc)
- SCOPUS
- EBSCO:EconLit
