= Emily Putnam-Hornstein =

American professor of social work

- Education: Yale University; Columbia University; University of California, Berkeley
- Scientific career
- Fields: Child welfare, predictive analytics
- Workplaces: University of Southern California; University of North Carolina at Chapel Hill

Emily Putnam-Hornstein is an American professor of social work at the University of North Carolina at Chapel Hill whose research specializes in child welfare policy, child maltreatment surveillance, and predictive analytics. She is the John A. Tate Distinguished Professor for Children in Need. Putnam-Hornstein was previously a social science researcher at University of Southern California.

== Education ==
Putnam-Hornstein earned a B.A. in psychology at Yale College in 2000. She completed a M.S. in social work at Columbia University School of Social Work in 2005.

In 2010, Putnam-Hornstein earned a Ph.D. in social welfare at the University of California, Berkeley. Her doctoral research examined predictors of child welfare involvement. That year, she published research in Children and Youth Services Review examining whether information available at birth could predict future involvement with child protective services. This research initially began as an academic exercise, but its findings led New Zealand's Ministry of Social Development to approach Putnam-Hornstein about practical applications.

== Career ==
Putnam-Hornstein is founder and faculty co-director of the Children's Data Network where she researches child welfare, child maltreatment, and predictive analytics. In 2012, she collaborated with New Zealand researcher Rhema Vaithianathan to develop a predictive risk modeling tool for children in families receiving public benefits. The model incorporated more than 100 factors, including mothers' ages and the dates of their first public-benefit payments, to help identify families who might benefit from parenting programs.

In 2019, Putnam-Hornstein began working with the Los Angeles County Department of Children and Family Services on a predictive analytics initiative examining child fatalities and other critical incidents. She earlier collaborated with Vaithianathan on the Allegheny Family Screening Tool, implemented by Allegheny County, Pennsylvania in August 2016. She has also researched racial and socioeconomic disparities in child welfare investigations and foster care placements. Putnam-Hornstein was interviewed about her research on the 2020 documentary series The Trials of Gabriel Fernandez.

By 2021, Putnam-Hornstein was a professor at the University of North Carolina School of Social Work (UNC). That year, she was lead author of a study published in the American Journal of Public Health examining rates of child protection involvement among children born in California in 1999. In an interview with Mother Jones, she raised concerns about the effects of child protection investigations on families, including the fear parents may experience over the possibility of losing custody of their children. At UNC, she is the John A. Tate Distinguished Professor for Children in Need. In 2024, Putnam-Hornstein was elected a fellow of the American Academy of Social Work and Social Welfare.
