= Scott H. Irwin =

Economist at the University of Illinois Urbana-Champaign)

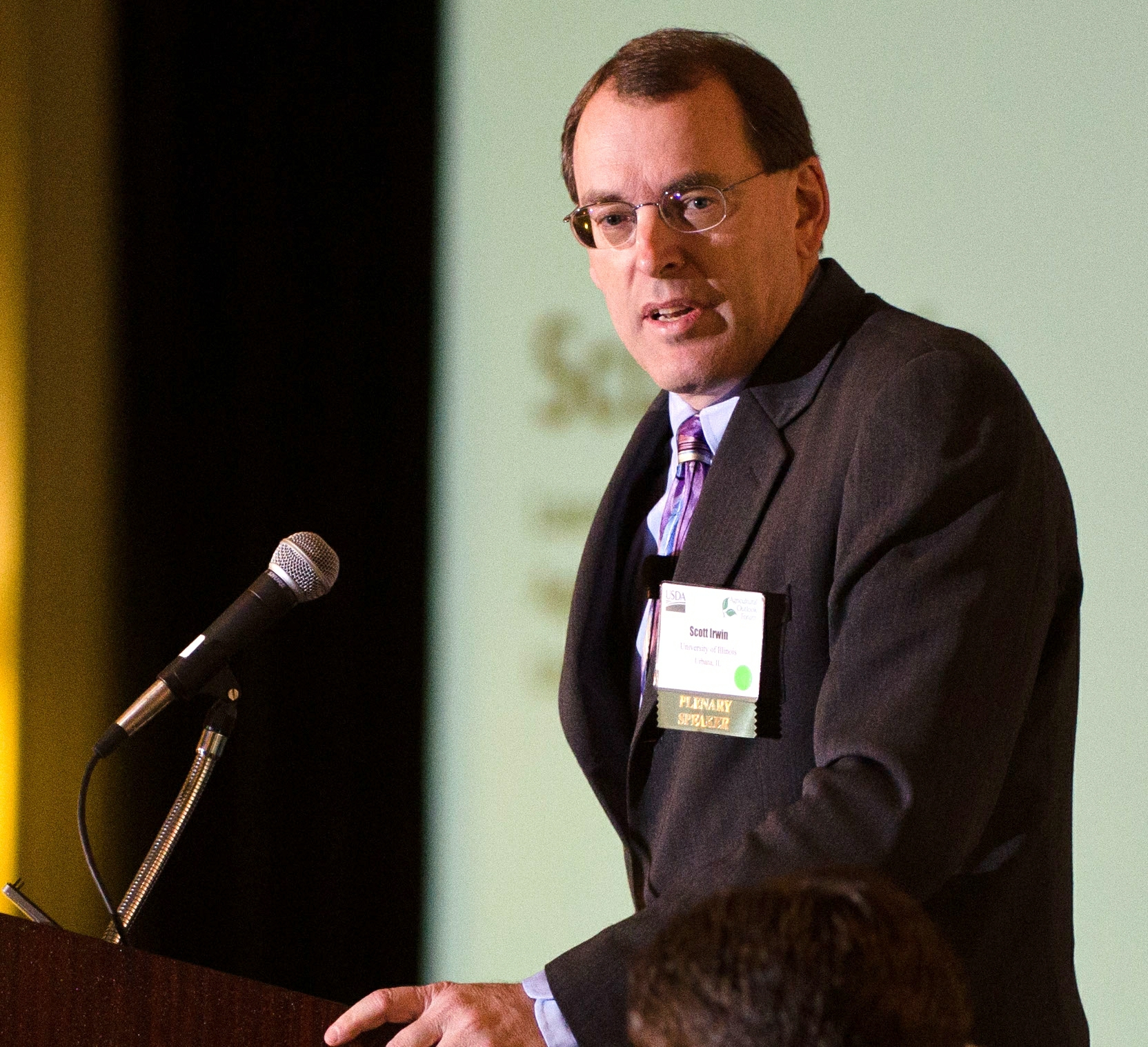
- Irwin in 2013

Academic background
- Education: Purdue University (PhD); Iowa State University(BS)

Academic work
- Discipline: Agricultural marketing
- Institutions: University of Illinois Urbana-Champaign
- Website: Information at IDEAS / RePEc

Scott H. Irwin is the Laurence J. Norton Chair of Agricultural Marketing and professor in the department of agricultural and consumer economics at University of Illinois Urbana-Champaign.

== Career ==
Irwin earned a bachelor's degree in agricultural business from Iowa State University in 1980 and both an MS and PhD in agricultural economics from Purdue University in 1983 and 1986, respectively.

== Research ==
His research on agricultural markets is cited by other academic researchers. One of his papers was selected as the "Top 25 Paper Published in the First 25 Years of the Journal of Economic Surveys". Irwin has worked on the impact of speculation in commodity market. He has been an active participant in the world-wide debate about the market impact of financial index investment in commodity markets, popularly known as financialization.

Scott H. Irwin was blamed, along with Craig Pirrong, by journalist David Kocieniewski for not disclosing ties with the financial industry. He has been paid for consulting services and research by private funding from financial companies. David Kocieniewski adds "Mr. Irwin declined to provide a list of his clients, and the university said its disclosure requirements did not compel him to do so". This report was heavily criticized by financial journalist Felix Salmon. David Kocienewski answered to issues raised by Felix Salmon but the latter found Kocienewski's answers unconvincing.

== Awards ==
- 2016, AAEA Quality of Research Discovery Award
- 2016, AAEA Distinguished Group Extension Program Award
- 2014, AAEA Quality of Communication Award
- 2014, AAEA Distinguished Group Extension Program Award
- 2013, AAEA Fellow
- 2002, AAEA Distinguished Group Extension Program Award
