= Oxford Review of Economic Policy =

- The cover of Oxford Review of Economic Policy
- Discipline: Economics
- Language: English
- Edited by: Christopher Allsopp

Publication details
- History: 1985-present
- Publisher: Oxford University Press (United Kingdom)
- Frequency: Quarterly
- Impact factor: 1.703 (2010)

Standard abbreviations
- ISO 4: Oxf. Rev. Econ. Policy

Indexing
- ISSN: 0266-903X (print); 1460-2121 (web)
- LCCN: 92648878
- OCLC no.: 473991426

Links
- Journal homepage; Online access; Online archive

Oxford Review of Economic Policy is a quarterly peer-reviewed academic journal of economics. Each issue concentrates on a current theme in economic policy, with a balance between macro- and microeconomics, and comprises an assessment and a number of articles.

== See also ==
- List of scholarly journals in economics
