= Journal of Financial Studies =

- Discipline: Finance
- Language: English
- Edited by: Sheng-Syan Chen

Publication details
- History: 1993–present
- Publisher: Taiwan Finance Association (Taiwan)
- Frequency: Quarterly

Standard abbreviations
- ISO 4: J. Financ. Stud.

Indexing
- ISSN: 1022-2898
- OCLC no.: 30805200

Links
- Journal homepage; Online access; Online archive

The Journal of Financial Studies is a quarterly peer-reviewed academic journal that was established in 1993 as the official publication of the Taiwan Finance Association. it covers all aspects of financial research. The journal is included in the Taiwan Social Science Citation Index of the National Science Council and EconLit.

== Aims and scope ==
The focus of this journal is undergraduate and graduate level. Coverage includes current research in behavioral finance, corporate governance, derivatives, financial management, real estate finance and others.
