= Journal of Trading =

- Discipline: Finance, investment
- Language: English

Publication details
- History: 2006-2018
- Publisher: Euromoney Institutional Investor (United States)
- Frequency: Quarterly

Standard abbreviations
- ISO 4: J. Trading

Indexing
- ISSN: 1559-3967

Links
- Journal homepage

The Journal of Trading was a quarterly academic journal covering tools and strategies in institutional trading including topics such as algorithmic trading, transaction costs, execution options, trading platforms, liquidity, and multi-asset trading. Its editor in chief is Brian R. Bruce (Finance Institute, Southern Methodist University).
