= The Singapore Economic Review =

- Discipline: Economics
- Language: English
- Edited by: Euston Quah

Publication details
- Former name: Malayan Economic Review
- History: 1956-present
- Publisher: World Scientific (Singapore)
- Frequency: 6/year
- Impact factor: 1.8 (2022)

Standard abbreviations
- ISO 4: Singap. Econ. Rev.

Indexing
- ISSN: 0217-5908 (print); 1793-6837 (web)
- LCCN: 86655822
- OCLC no.: 10678845

Links
- Journal homepage; Online access; Online archive

The Singapore Economic Review is a peer-reviewed academic journal published by World Scientific. The journal was established in 1956 as the Malayan Economic Review, obtaining its current name in 1969. It is the official journal of the Economic Society of Singapore. The journal covers economics in general, with an emphasis on economic issues in Asia. According to the Journal Citation Reports, the journal has a 2020 impact factor of 1.315.

The journal is published by the World Scientific Publishing Co Pte Ltd. The SER covers a wide range of topics related to the economy, including macroeconomics, international trade, labor economics, and financial economics. The journal is published quarterly and is considered an important source of information and analysis on the Singaporean economy for researchers, policymakers, and other professionals.

== Abstracting and indexing ==
The journal is abstracted and indexed in:

- Academic OneFile
- EBSCO databases
- EconLit
- GEOBASE
- International Bibliography of the Social Sciences
- ProQuest databases
- RePEC
- Scopus
- Social Sciences Citation Index
