= Journal of Policy Modeling =

- Language: English
- Edited by: Antonio Maria Costa

Publication details
- History: 1979–present
- Publisher: Elsevier (United States)
- Frequency: Bimonthly
- Impact factor: 1.2 (2018)

Standard abbreviations
- ISO 4: J. Policy Model.

Indexing
- ISSN: 0161-8938
- OCLC no.: 4058752

Links
- Journal homepage; Online access

The Journal of Policy Modeling is a peer-reviewed academic journal that covers research in economics and policy. The journal was established in 1979 and is published by Elsevier for the Society for Policy Modeling. It publishes academic research papers analyzing national and international policy issues. The Journal of Policy Modeling is ranked by the CNRS, the ESSEC Business School, and SCIMago, among others.

According to the Journal Citation Reports, the journal has a 2018 impact factor of 1.2.
