= Daniel F. Spulber =

American academic

- Born: January 31, 1953 (age 73)
- Education: University of Michigan; Northwestern University
- Scientific career
- Fields: International economics, industrial organization, microeconomic theory, innovation, entrepreneurship, management strategy, law
- Workplaces: Brown University, University of Southern California, California Institute of Technology, Northwestern University
- Doctoral advisor: Dale T. Mortensen

Daniel F. Spulber (born January 31, 1953) is the Elinor Hobbs Distinguished Professor of International Business and professor of strategy at the Kellogg School of Management (Northwestern University), where he has taught since 1990. Spulber is also professor of law at the Northwestern University School of Law and research director of the Searle Center on Law, Regulation, and Economic Growth. He is the founding editor-in-chief of the Journal of Economics & Management Strategy.

== Education and early career ==
His father was the Romanian economist Nicolas Spulber, who taught for many years at Indiana University Bloomington. Daniel Spulber received his B.A. in economics from the University of Michigan in 1974, his M.A. in economics from Northwestern University in 1976, and his Ph.D. in economics from Northwestern University in 1979. He taught at Brown University, the University of Southern California, and the California Institute of Technology before returning to Northwestern.

== Academic work ==
Spulber's research is in the areas of international economics, industrial organization, microeconomic theory, innovation, entrepreneurship, management strategy, and law. In 1996, he was ranked 6th among economists in the United States and also highly ranked for 1979-2003 adjusted appearances. Spulber has published numerous journal articles in economics journals and law reviews.

== Selected books ==
=== Books written ===
- The Innovative Entrepreneur. Cambridge University Press. 2014. ISBN 9781107047259.
- The Theory of the Firm: Microeconomics with Endogenous Entrepreneurs, Firms, Markets, and Organizations. Cambridge University Press. 2009. ISBN 978-0-521-51738-6.
- Economics and Management of Competitive Strategy, 2009, New Jersey: World Scientific Press
- Networks in Telecommunications: Economics and Law, with Christopher Yoo, 2009, Cambridge: Cambridge University Press
- Global Competitive Strategy, 2007, Cambridge: Cambridge University Press
- Management Strategy, 2004, New York: McGraw Hill
- Market Microstructure: Intermediaries and the Theory of the Firm, 1999, New York: Cambridge University Press
- The Market Makers: How Leading Companies Create and Win Markets, 1998, New York: McGraw-Hill/ Business Week Books
- Deregulatory Takings and the Regulatory Contract: The Competitive Transformation of Network Industries in the United States, with J. Gregory Sidak, 1997, Cambridge University Press
- Protecting Competition from the Postal Monopoly, with J. Gregory Sidak, 1996, Washington, D.C.: American Enterprise Institute
- Regulation and Markets, 1989, Cambridge, Mass: MIT Press

=== Books edited ===
- Famous Fables of Economics: Myths of Market Failures, 2002, Malden, MA: Basil Blackwell
- Essays in the Economics of Renewable Resources, edited with Leonard J. Mirman, 1982, Amsterdam: Elsevier-North Holland Publishing Co.
