= Electronic Commerce Research =

- Discipline: Electronic commerce
- Language: English
- Edited by: J. Christopher Westland

Publication details
- History: 2001-present
- Publisher: Springer Science+Business Media
- Frequency: Quarterly
- Impact factor: 4.7 (2024)

Standard abbreviations
- ISO 4: Electron. Commer. Res.

Indexing
- ISSN: 1389-5753 (print); 1572-9362 (web)
- OCLC no.: 1117063779

Links
- Journal homepage; Online Archive

Electronic Commerce Research is a peer-reviewed academic journal published by Springer Science+Business Media. The journal focuses on disseminating the latest findings in all facets of electronic commerce. A sampling of topics published in the journal as they relate to the Internet and electronic commerce include intelligent agents technologies and their impact; economics of electronic commerce; virtual electronic commerce systems; service creation and provisioning; supply chain management through the internet; collaborative learning, gaming, and work; and workflow for electronic commerce applications.

== Abstracting and indexing ==
The journal is abstracted and indexed in DBLP, Research Papers in Economics, Scopus, and the Social Sciences Citation Index. According to the Journal Citation Reports, the journal has a 2024 impact factor of 4.7.
