= Research in Economics =

- Discipline: Economics
- Language: English
- Edited by: Michele Boldrin; David K. Levine

Publication details
- Former name: Ricerche Economiche
- History: 1947-present
- Publisher: Elsevier
- Frequency: Quarterly
- Open access: Hybrid

Standard abbreviations
- ISO 4: Res. Econ.

Indexing
- ISSN: 1090-9443 (print); 1090-9451 (web)
- OCLC no.: 610525256

Links
- Journal homepage; Online archive; Online archive of Ricerche Economiche

Research in Economics is a quarterly peer-reviewed academic journal of economics. It is published by Elsevier and the editor-in-chief is Federico Etro (Ca' Foscari University of Venice). The journal was established in 1947 as Ricerche Economiche and obtained its current title in 1997. The journal is abstracted and indexed in Research Papers in Economics.
