= Agricultural & Applied Economics Association =

The Agricultural and Applied Economics Association (AAEA) is a professional association of people working in agricultural and applied economics.

== History ==
In 1910, the American Farm Management Association was founded at Iowa State University. In 1919, the association was renamed the American Farm Economics Association. In 1968, a group left the organization and formed the American Agricultural Economics Association. The organisation was later renamed the Agricultural and Applied Economics Association.

The association holds an annual meeting. The Journal of the Agricultural and Applied Economics Association was launched in 2021.

Fellows of the association include Scott H. Irwin and Elisabeth Sadoulet.

== Journals ==
The association publishes three journals, all of which are published by Wiley:

- American Journal of Agricultural Economics
- Applied Economic Perspectives and Policy
- Journal of the Agricultural and Applied Economics Association
