= Journal of Agricultural Economics =

- Discipline: Agricultural economics
- Language: English
- Edited by: David Harvey

Publication details
- Former name: Journal of the Proceedings of the Agricultural Economics Society
- History: 1928-present
- Publisher: Wiley-Blackwell on behalf of the Agricultural Economics Society
- Frequency: Triannually
- Impact factor: 3.581 (2020)

Standard abbreviations
- ISO 4: J. Agric. Econ.

Indexing
- CODEN: JAGEA7
- ISSN: 0021-857X (print); 1477-9552 (web)
- LCCN: 78645834
- OCLC no.: 802975336

Links
- Journal homepage; Online access; Online archive

The Journal of Agricultural Economics is a triannual peer-reviewed academic journal published by Wiley-Blackwell on behalf of the Agricultural Economics Society. It was established in 1928 as the Journal of the Proceedings of the Agricultural Economics Society and became the Journal of Agricultural Economics in 1955. The journal covers research on agricultural economics with relation to other fields such as statistics, marketing, politics, and business management as well as history and sociology and the environment.

According to the Journal Citation Reports, the journal has a 2020 impact factor of 3.581, ranking it 7/35 in the category "AGRICULTURAL ECONOMICS & POLICY".
