= Economics & Sociology =

- Discipline: Economics, sociology
- Language: English
- Edited by: Tomasz Bernat

Publication details
- History: 2008-present
- Publisher: Centre of Sociological Research (Poland)
- Frequency: Quarterly

Standard abbreviations
- ISO 4: Econ. Sociol.

Indexing
- ISSN: 2306-3459 (print); 2071-789X (web)
- LCCN: 2013273031
- JSTOR: 23063459
- OCLC no.: 852079699

Links
- Journal homepage

Economics & Sociology is a peer-reviewed academic journal covering the socio-economic analysis of societies and economies, institutions, and organizations, social groups, networks and relationships. It was established in 2008 and is published by the Centre of Sociological Research (Poland). The editor-in-chief is Tomasz Bernat (Szczecin University).

== Abstracting and indexing ==
The journal is abstracted and indexed in:

- Emerging Sources Citation Index (ESCI)
- EconLit
- EBSCOhost
- Scopus
- ProQuest
- CAB Abstracts
