= María del Carmen Guisán =

Spanish economist

María del Carmen Guisán is a professor at the University of Santiago de Compostela and one of the 20 most influential Spanish economists according to the newspaper El Confidencial. She is currently the editor of the academic journal Applied Econometrics and International Development.

== Research ==
Her research focuses on development, macro-econometric models and European economic dynamics. Her research focuses on macroeconomic models on which she has written a textbook and she has also written an econometrics textbook in Spanish. She was listed as one of the 20 most influential Spanish economists and is ranked as one of the 100 most influential female economists on IDEAS. She also wrote an op-ed in the New York Times arguing that Germany should focus less on austerity within the Eurozone.

== Selected bibliography ==
• Guisan, Maria-Carmen and Aguayo, Eva (2007). Education, Research and Regional Economic Disparities in 25 Countries of the European Union after 2004 Enlargemente: Econometric Models and Policy Challenges, Chapter. In Korres, G.M. (Eds) Regionalization, Growth and Economic Integration. Contributions to Economics. Physica-Verlag HD. https://doi.org/10.1007/978-3-7908-1925-0_8 Print ISBN 978-3-7908-1924-3 • Guisan, Maria-Carmen; Aguayo, Eva; Exposito, Pilar (2015). MDGs and international cooperation: analysis of private and public aid and the role of education. In B. Mak Arvin and Byron Lee (2015) Handbook on the Economics of Foreign Aid. ISBN 9781783474578. Edward Elgar Publishing.

- Guisan, Maria-Carmen (2005). Macro-econometric Models: The Role of Demand and Supply. ICFAI University Press. ISBN 978-81-7881-778-1.
- Guisan, M. Carmen; Aguayo, Eva; Exposito, Pilar (2001). "Economic growth and cycles: Cross-country models of education, industry and fertility and international comparisons". Applied Econometrics and International Development. 1 (1): 9–37.
- Guisan, M. C.; Exposito, P. (2010). "Health Expenditure, Education, Government Effectiveness and Quality of Life in Africa and Asia". Regional and Sectoral Economic Studies. 10 (1).
