= Asian Economic Papers =

- Discipline: Economics
- Language: English

Publication details
- History: 2000–present
- Publisher: MIT Press (United States)
- Frequency: Triannually

Standard abbreviations
- ISO 4: Asian Econ. Pap.

Indexing
- ISSN: 1535-3516 (print); 1536-0083 (web)
- OCLC no.: 47029730

Links
- Journal homepage; Online access

Asian Economic Papers is a peer-reviewed academic journal that focuses on the analysis of economic issues in Asia. The journal was founded in 2000 and is published online and in hard copy by the MIT Press. Asian Economic Papers is sponsored by The Earth Institute at Columbia University, the Global Security Research Center at Keio University, the Korea Institute for International Economic Policy, and the Global Development Program at the Brookings Institution.

== See also ==
- Economy of Asia
