= Saman Kelegama =

Sri Lankan economist

Dr. Saman Kelegama
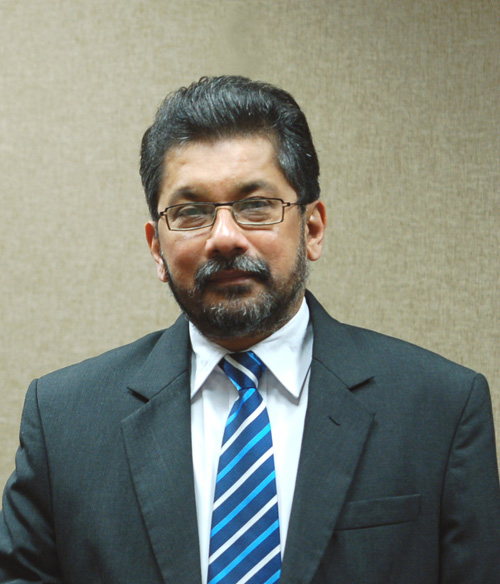
- Saman Kelegama

Personal details
- Born: 6 April 1959 Kandy, Dominion of Ceylon (now Sri Lanka)
- Died: 23 June 2017 (aged 58) Bangkok, Thailand
- Spouse(s): Sirimavo Kelegama (née Ratwatte)
- Children: Chandana, Jayathri
- Parent(s): Dr. Jayantha Kelegama (father); Padma Kelegama (mother)
- Education: University of Oxford, Indian Institute of Technology (IIT), Kanpur, India
- Profession: International economist, macroeconomist

Saman Kelegama (6 April 1959 – 23 June 2017) was a Sri Lankan economist, author and the executive director of the Institute of Policy Studies (Sri Lanka) (IPS).

== Early life and education ==
Kelegama was born and grew up in Colombo under the influence of his father, Deshamanya Jayantha Kelegama, who was both an academic and civil servant.

He received his secondary and primary education in Sri Lanka at Royal College, Colombo and St. Thomas' Preparatory School respectively. Subsequently, after completing his master's degree (1983) in Mathematics (Five year integrated programme) at the Indian Institute of Technology (IIT), Kanpur, India, he completed his M.Sc. (1985) and D.Phil. (1990) in economics at St Catherine's College, Oxford University, UK.

== Career ==
Kelegama joined the Institute of Policy Studies of Sri Lanka (IPS) in 1990 and served as a research fellow until 1994, and was appointed executive director in 1995.

He was engaged in fund raising and networking activities for the IPS for two decades. The development of the IPS Endowment Fund and the new Head Office were two of his many achievements in fund raising at the IPS. The initiation of the South Asia Economic Journal and the South Asia Economic Summit were two noteworthy achievements in regional networking. Kelegama co-edits the South Asia Economic Journal. While working at the IPS he was closely associated with many academic institutions, the government and the private sector of Sri Lanka.

He was a member of the governing boards of the South Asia Centre for Policy Studies (SACEPS), Kathmandu, Nepal (since 2001), Postgraduate Institute of Management – University of Sri Jayawardenapura (since 2012), Social Policy Analysis and Research Center(SPARC),(since 2005), Gamani Corea Foundation (since 2012).

He was a member of the editorial boards of various journals including the South Asia Economic Journal (founding editor), the Journal of the Indian Ocean Region (Routledge), Asia Pacific Development Journal (UNESCAP), Trade Insight (SWTEE), and the Sri Lankan Journal of Management. Kelegama was the president of the Sri Lanka Economic Association from April 1999 to May 2003. He was instrumental in the merger of the Sri Lanka Association of Economists with the Sri Lanka Economic Association in the year 2000. He was also instrumental in merging Upanathi with the Sri Lanka Economic Journal and bringing out a new series. He was an Honorary Fellow of the Sri Lanka Economic Association.

He was a Member/Executive Council Member of a number of institutions/associations including, the Sri Lanka Economic Association, the Organization of Professional Association of Sri Lanka, the Coalition of Action of South Asian Cooperation (CASAC-Sri Lanka Chapter), and Centre for Regulation and Competition, University of Manchester, UK.

He was a Visiting Lecturer at the Postgraduate Institute of Management and the Bandaranaike International Diplomatic Training Institute in Colombo. He was a visiting Fellow at the International Institute of Social Studies at The Hague (1992), Australia-South Asia Centre, Australian National University (1998) and the Centre for Migration and Development at the University of Western Australia (1993–2000). He was an international visitor at the United States Information Service (1993), Indian Council for Cultural Relations (1998).

He was a Fellow of the National Academy of Sciences in Sri Lanka (elected in 2006) and a Salzburg Fellow(1997).

=== Public sector ===
While working at the IPS, Kelegama served on a number of Sri Lankan government boards and committees including; Industrial Development Board, National Enterprise Development Authority, Presidential Taxation Commission, 'Committee on Development and Management of Estates Leased out to Regional Plantation Companies, National Economic Council, National Development Trust Fund, Committee on Regional Trade Agreements of Sri Lanka, Joint Study Group: India – Sri Lanka Comprehensive Economic Partnership Agreement, * Independent South Asia Commission on Poverty Alleviation, * Fair Trading Commission, Industrial Task Force, Industrialization Commission, Human Resources Development Council, Public Enterprise Reform Commission' and Board of Investment of Sri Lanka(BOI).

Kelegama was appointed as the chairperson by the Government of Sri Lanka in a number of Boards & Committees including Technical Negotiation Committees on "Trade in Services" & "Economic Cooperation" of the India-Sri Lanka Comprehensive Economic Partnership Agreement since 2005 to 2008.

He also served as the Chairperson of the "Regaining Sri Lanka" Policy Development Committees on Land Transport and Infrastructure Development from 2002 to 2004, Small and Medium Industrial Task Force to prepare the White Paper since 2001 to 2002, SAARC Research Network since 1998 to 2001 and Indian Ocean Rim Academic Group since 1997 to present.

He was appointed as the Economic Advisor to the Ministry of Industrial Development (2002–2004) and was a member of the Sri Lankan official delegation to: ESCAP Annual Sessions in 1999 and 2000 in Bangkok, Thailand; WTO Ministerial Summit in Singapore in 1996 and in Hong Kong in 2005; 12th SAARC Summit in Islamabad, Pakistan in 2004; UNCTAD XI in São Paulo, Brazil in 2004; Doha Development Round in Qatar in 2006 among others.

The establishment of the Consumer Affairs Authority in 2003 was based on a report he jointly authored and recommended for the merger of the Fair Trading Commission and the Department of Internal Trade to form one single institution. Moreover, the establishment of the National Enterprise Development Authority in 2006 was based on a White Paper of Small and Medium Enterprises (SMEs) prepared in 2002 by a committee chaired by Kelegama which recommended for an authority to deal with problems of SMEs.

=== Private sector ===
Kelegama was the chairman of Singer (Sri Lanka) PLC (from 2015 until his demise). He served on a number of boards in the Sri Lankan Blue chip and other companies including Singer (Sri Lanka) and its subsidiaries – Regnis Lanka, and Singer Finance, SC Securities, Colombo Stock Exchange, Sampath Bank, Centre for Private Sector Development and Five Year Apparel Sector Strategy Task Force.

He also served as the chairperson of the Evaluation Committee on Best Corporate Citizen Award of the Ceylon Chamber of Commerce from 2004 to 2013; and was the head of the panel of judges for the Exporter of the Year Award of the National Chamber of Exporters of Sri Lanka from 1998 to 2008. He also served as the head of panel of judges of the Sri Lanka – Entrepreneur of the Year Award 1996 of the Federation of Chambers of Commerce and Industry of Sri Lanka and was a member of the panel of judges for the selection of the Best Corporate Annual Report of the Institute of Chartered Accountants of Sri Lanka in 2002.

== Death ==
Kelegama died of a heart attack, on 23 June 2017 while attending a seminar in Bangkok, Thailand. He was 58 years old.

== Awards and posthumous recognition ==
Posthumously, the Institute of Policy Studies of Sri Lanka (IPS) named its state-of-the-art auditorium as the ‘Dr. Saman Kelegama Auditorium’, dedicating it to its late executive director, in memory of his vision, leadership, and guidance.

A special session to commemorate Kelegama was held during the Think Tank Initiative's 7th South Asia Regional Meeting 2018 (TTI RM7) held in Dhaka, Bangladesh, organised by the Centre for Policy Dialogue. In fact, the whole 4 day event was dedicated to his memory. The special session reflected on the contributions of Kelegama, who dedicated his professional life to promoting South Asian integration.

Kelegama was posthumously conferred the ICCR Distinguished Alumni Award by the Government of India at a ceremony in New Delhi on the 13th of April 2018. The award is presented to distinguished foreign alumni of Indian Universities and Dr Kelegama was recognised for his significant contributions in the field of Economics and for his efforts towards strengthening Sri Lanka - India Economic ties and friendship.

In December 2017, the Postgraduate Institute of Management (PIM) of the Sri Jayawardenapura University of Sri Lanka decided to name the gold medal for the best performing student in its Executive MBA program as the 'Dr. Saman Kelegama Memorial Gold Medal' as a fitting tribute to preserve his presence at the PIM for posterity. Furthermore, the PIM dedicated the 14th edition of the Professional Manager magazine to him, launching the book in April 2018. Titled ‘Insights on an Irreplaceable Icon’, this issue contains 25 articles dedicated to Kelegama.

The IPS launched the Saman Kelegama memorial lecture in June 2018 to mark the first death anniversary of Kelegama. The inaugural lecture was held on the theme ‘Managing Domestic and International Opportunities and Challenges for Stability and Growth’ and was delivered by the governor of the Central Bank of Sri Lanka (CBSL), Indrajit Coomaraswamy. Coomaraswamy noted that Kelegama was an embodiment of many qualities, both professional and human; despite his many accolades and achievements, he was always modest, kind, unassuming, and humane, he said.

IPS also hosted a 'Dr. Saman Kelegama Memorial Conference', which was held in Colombo under the patronage of Sri Lankan Prime Minister Ranil Wickremesinghe and International Trade and Development Strategies Minister Malik Samarawickrama. The 2 day event was themed ‘Managing Domestic and International Challenges and Opportunities in Post-Conflict Development: Lessons from Sri Lanka' and brought together eminent economists from Sri Lanka and abroad, including Sri Lankan economists overseas and key figures from South Asian think tanks and international agencies, as resource persons. The conference was organised to mark Kelegama's first death anniversary.

== Works ==
- Foreign Aid in South Asia: The Emerging Scenario. SAGE Publications, 2012. ISBN 978-81-32109-72-3 (paperback) ISBN 978-81-32108-74-0 (hardcover)
- Economic and Social Development under a Market Economy Regime in Sri Lanka (Volume 2). VIJITHA YAPA PUBLICATIONS, 2012. ISBN 978-95-56651-51-5 (paperback)
- Economic and Social Development under a Market Economy Regime in Sri Lanka (Volume 1). VIJITHA YAPA PUBLICATIONS, 2011. ISBN 978-95-56651-50-8 (paperback)
- Trade Liberalisation and Poverty in South Asia (Routledge Studies in the Growth Economies of Asia). Routledge, 2011. ISBN 978-04-15561-75-4 (hardcover)
- Migration, Remittances and Development in South Asia, SAGE Publications, 2011. ISBN 978-81-32106-41-8 (hardcover)
- Promoting Economic Cooperation in South Asia: Beyond SAFTA, SAGE Publications, 2010. ISBN 978-81-32103-11-0 (hardcover)
- Trade in Services in South Asia: Opportunities and Risks of Liberalization, SAGE Publications, 2009. ISBN 978-81-78299-37-2 (hardcover)
- South Asian Yearbook of Trade and Development: Harnessing Gains from Trade: Domestic Challenges and Beyond, Academic Foundation, 2009. ISBN 978-95-58708-36-1 (paperback)
- South Asia in the WTO, SAGE Publications, 2008. ISBN 978-07-61936-14-5 (hardcover)
- Development Under Stress: Sri Lankan Economy in Transition, SAGE Publications, 2006. ISBN 978-07-61935-36-0 (hardcover)
- Contemporary Economic Issues: Sri Lanka in the Global Context, Sri Lanka Economic Association, 2006. ISBN 978-95-56200-20-1
- South Asia after the Quota System, Impact of the MFA Phase-Out, Institute of Policy Studies in association with Friedrich-Ebert-Stiftung, 2005. ISBN 978-95-58708-36-1
- Economic Policy in Sri Lanka: Issues and Debates, SAGE Publications, 2004. ISBN 978-07-61932-78-9 (hardcover)
- Ready-made Garment Industry in Sri Lanka: Facing the Global Challenge, SAGE Publications, 2004. ISBN 978-95-58708-24-8 (paperback)
- Privatization in Sri Lanka: Experience During the Early Years of Implementation, Diane Publications, 1993. ISBN 978-07-88110-44-3
