= Jayantha Kelegama =

Deshamanya Dr. Jayantha Kelegama
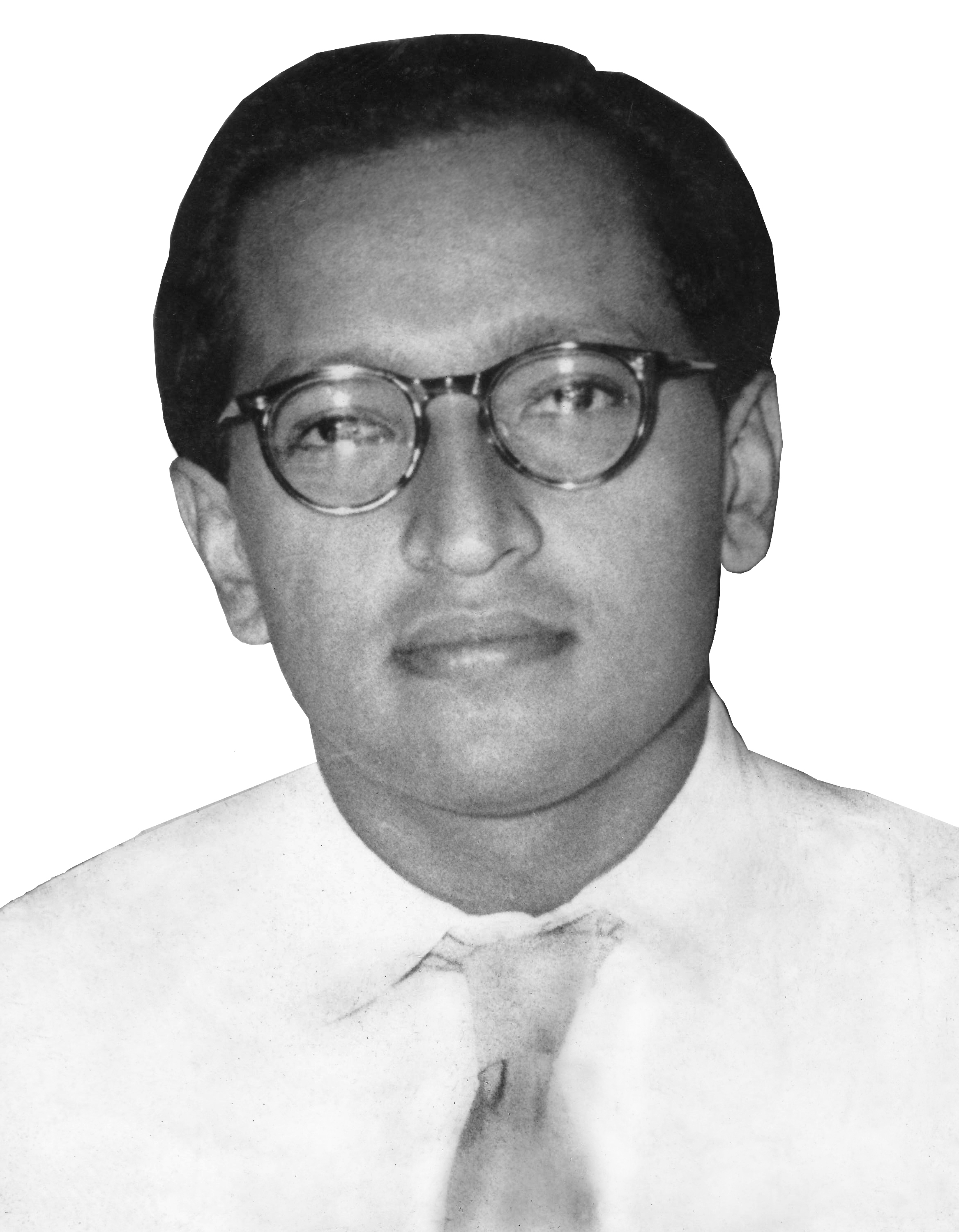
- Jayantha Kelegama
- Born: 1928; Kurunegala, Ceylon
- Died: 2005 (aged 76–77); Colombo, Sri Lanka
- Spouse: Padma Kelegama

Academic background
- Education: Maliyadeva College; Trinity College, Kandy; University of Ceylon; University of Oxford

Academic work
- Discipline: Fabian socialism, Keynesian economics
- School or tradition: Post-Keynesian economics

Deshamanya Jayantha Kelegama (1928–2005) was a Sri Lankan economist and civil servant. He belongs to the first generation of economists in the post-independent Sri Lanka.

== Family ==
Kelegama married Padmini and they had two sons; one of them was Sri Lankan economist Dr. Saman Kelegama.

== Education ==
After graduating from the University of Colombo with a degree in economics, Kelegama joined the Central Bank of Sri Lanka in the early-1950s with the first batch of officers which included Gamani Corea, Warnasena Rasaputra, among others. He proceeded to Oxford University for post graduate studies under a Central Bank scholarship thereafter.

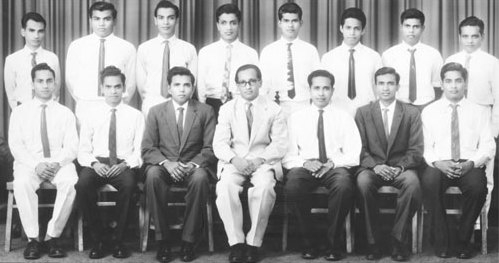
Prof. Jayantha Kelegama is seated in the middle with the Faculty of the Department of Economics and the Student Members of the Economic Association (1964–1965) of the Vidyalankara University of Sri Lanka.

== Career ==
After completing his doctorate in 1957, Kelegama returned to Sri Lanka and re-joined the Central Bank. He was seconded as the Senior Assistant Secretary to the Ministry of Trade in 1960 and in 1963 he was appointed as the Director of Economic Research in the Ministry of Finance – a post he held till 1966. It was during the 1960s that Kelegama together with P.B. Karandawala played a crucial role in formulating budgets of the 1960–1965 government. Kelegama served under three Finance Ministers during that time: T.B. Ilangaratne, Felix Dias Bandaranaike, and Dr. N.M. Perera. He was instrumental in establishing the People's Bank and the Sri Lanka Insurance Corporation in the early 1960s with the then Finance Minister, T.B. Ilangartna. He was also instrumental in introducing the Business Turnover Tax. He contributed to the preparation of budgets of the former Finance Minister, U.B. Wanninayake during 1965–1967.

He became the first Professor of Economics at Vidyalankara after it was converted from a Pirivena to a university in the late 1950s by Prime Minister, S.W.R.D. Bandaranaike’s government. He with a few others pioneered the teaching of Economics in Sinhala at the University of Vidyalankara after swabasha was introduced. His contemporaries at Vidyalankara were K. Dharmasena, Tilak Ratnakara, Kamal Karunanayake, among others. During this period, he wrote many articles and made extensive contributions to the Ceylon Economist and to the news papers. Other contributors to Ceylon Economist at that time were I.D.S. Weerawardena, F.R. Jayasuriya, A.D.V.de S. Indraratna, H.A.de S. Gunasekera, Buddhadasa Hewavitharana, among others.

In 1968, he was appointed as the Director-General of Commerce under the Dudley Senanayake government and served in that position for two years. During 1970–1977, he served as the Permanent Secretary to the Ministry of External & Internal Trade with T.B. Ilangaratne as the Minister under the Sirimavo Bandaranaike government. State Trading Corporation, Sri Lanka Tractor Corporation, etc., were new initiatives at that time.

=== Economic consultancy at UN Agencies ===
During 1977–1990 he pursued a career outside Sri Lanka serving in various international organizations such as UNCTAD, FAO, and ESCAP as an economic consultant.

== Honorary positions ==
He, together with H.N.S. Karunatileke and A.D.V. de S. Indraratna formed the Sri Lanka Economic Association in 1985 where he served as the Vice President from 1985 to 1991.

In 1994/1995, he served as the Chairman of the Tea Commission and during 1996–2002 he served as the Chancellor of the Rajarata University. He was the first Chancellor of the Rajarata University.

== Humanitarian works ==
During the 1990s, he played a key role in two leading humanitarian organizations, viz., the Cancer Society and Sahanaya and served as the chairman in both these institutions for many years.

== Approach to economic analysis ==
Kelegama belonged to the older generation of economists who were every much influenced by Fabian socialism and Keynesian economics. He stood at the centre-left of the political spectrum in his economic thinking. He was a prolific writer with contributions to Ceylon Economist, Economic Review, Sri Lanka Economic Journal and to the newspapers. His papers on the rural economy of Sri Lanka and peasantry are still widely quoted by scholars. During the time of the globalization debate, he made many notable contributions on pros and cons of globalization to various journals. He delivered many lectures on economic topics of contemporary interest at various forums – Philip Gunawardena Memorial lecture, N.M. Perera Memorial lecture, etc.

His thinking on economic issues was articulated in his weekly column to the Sunday Island under the name Kanes. Under the column, many subjects ranging from: globalization, Washington Consensus, WTO, regional & bilateral free trade agreements, and domestic economic policy issues were discussed. He wrote this column from 1995 to 2005.

The running theme on many of his articles on the domestic economy was that Sri Lanka is still not prepared for a total free market economy because of the not very strong supply base in the country, and until the supply base was adequately developed a mixed economy should be pursued. A Keynesian type of government initiated fiscal stimulus was necessary, he argued, to develop the supply potential in the economy. In other words, he gave an alternative viewpoint to that of ardent advocates of a total free market economy who argued that with the free operation of the market forces, the supply base will automatically develop with minimum state intervention.

== Awards ==
In recognition of his service to the Nation he was conferred with Deshamanya by the government of Sri Lanka in 1994 and in recognition of his contribution to economic teaching and economic policy making he was conferred with Artha Shastra Shiromnai by the University of Kelaniya in 2002. He was posthumously awarded Trinity Lion by the Trinity College, Kandy in 2013.

== See also ==
- List of Sri Lankan non-career Permanent Secretaries
