= List of international business journals =

The following is a list of major and notable scholarly journals in international business. The list is not comprehensive, as there are many other journals that are published. The list contains most of the prominent journals in the field.

- Corporate Governance: An International Review
- Cross-Cultural Research
- European Journal of International Management
- Global Strategy Journal
- International Small Business Journal
- Journal of International Business Studies
- Journal of International Economics
- Journal of International Management
- Management International Review
