= Studies in Microeconomics =

- Discipline: Economics
- Language: English
- Edited by: Sahana Roy Chowdhury

Publication details
- History: 2013
- Publisher: SAGE Publications (India)
- Frequency: Biannual

Standard abbreviations
- ISO 4: Stud. Microecon.

Indexing
- ISSN: 2321-0222 (print); 2321-8398 (web)

Links
- Journal homepage; Online access; Online archive

Studies in Microeconomics is a peer-reviewed journal that provides a forum for discussion on all areas of microeconomics.

It is published twice in a year by SAGE Publications.

== Abstracting and indexing ==
Studies in Microeconomics is abstracted and indexed in:

- DeepDyve
- Dutch-KB
- CCC
- J-Gate
- ProQuest: Worldwide Political Science Abstracts
- UGC-CARE : Consortium for Academic Research and Ethics
- Scopus
