= Health Economics =

- Discipline: Health economics
- Language: English
- Edited by: Sally Stearns

Publication details
- History: 1992-present
- Publisher: John Wiley & Sons
- Frequency: Monthly
- Open access: Hybrid
- Impact factor: 2.0 (2023)

Standard abbreviations
- ISO 4: Health Econ.

Indexing
- CODEN: HEECEZ
- ISSN: 1057-9230 (print); 1099-1050 (web)
- LCCN: 92645957
- OCLC no.: 771149345

Links
- Journal homepage; Online access; Online archive

Health Economics is a monthly peer-reviewed academic journal published by John Wiley & Sons, covering the subject of health economics. It was established in 1992.

According to the Journal Citation Reports, the journal has a 2023 impact factor of 2.0, ranking it 60th out of 118 journals in the category "Health Policy & Services", 92nd out of 174 journals in the category "Health Care Sciences & Services", and 207th out of 600 journals in the category "Economics",

== See also ==
- Journal of Health Economics
- List of scholarly journals in economics
