= American Journal of Agricultural Economics =

- Discipline: Agricultural economics
- Language: English

Publication details
- Former name: Journal of Farm Economics
- History: 1919–present
- Publisher: Wiley
- Frequency: 5/year
- Impact factor: 4.082 (2020)

Standard abbreviations
- ISO 4: Am. J. Agric. Econ.

Indexing
- ISSN: 0002-9092 (print); 1467-8276 (web)

Links
- Journal homepage

The American Journal of Agricultural Economics is a peer-reviewed academic journal of agricultural, natural resource, and environmental economics, as well as rural and community development. Published five times per year, it is one of two journals published by the Agricultural & Applied Economics Association, along with Applied Economic Perspectives and Policy. It was established in 1919, at which point it was called the Journal of Farm Economics.

== Editors ==
The current editors are Amy Ando (University of Illinois, Urbana-Champaign), Marc Bellemare (University of Minnesota), Jill McCluskey (Washington State University), and Jesse Tack (Kansas State University).
