= The Manchester School (journal) =

- Language: English
- Edited by: Akos Valentinyi

Publication details
- Impact factor: 1.200 (2020)

Standard abbreviations
- ISO 4: Manch. Sch.

Indexing
- ISSN: 1467-9957

Links
- Journal homepage

The Manchester School is an economics journal, edited since 1932 by the School of Social Science at the University of Manchester in Manchester, England. It is currently published by John Wiley & Sons.

Every volume of The Manchester School incorporates five regular issues, one special issue devoted to a particular theme and a further special supplement containing selected papers from the Money, Macroeconomics and Finance Research Group Conference.
