= Agricultural economics =

Applied field of economics

Agricultural economics is an applied field of economics concerned with the application of economic theory in optimizing the production and distribution of food and fiber products. Agricultural economics began as a branch of economics that specifically dealt with land usage. It focused on maximizing the crop yield while maintaining a good soil ecosystem. Throughout the 20th century the discipline expanded and the current scope of the discipline is much broader. Agricultural economics today includes a variety of applied areas, having considerable overlap with conventional economics. Agricultural economists have made substantial contributions to research in economics, econometrics, development economics, and environmental economics. Agricultural economics influences food policy, agricultural policy, and environmental policy.

== Origins ==
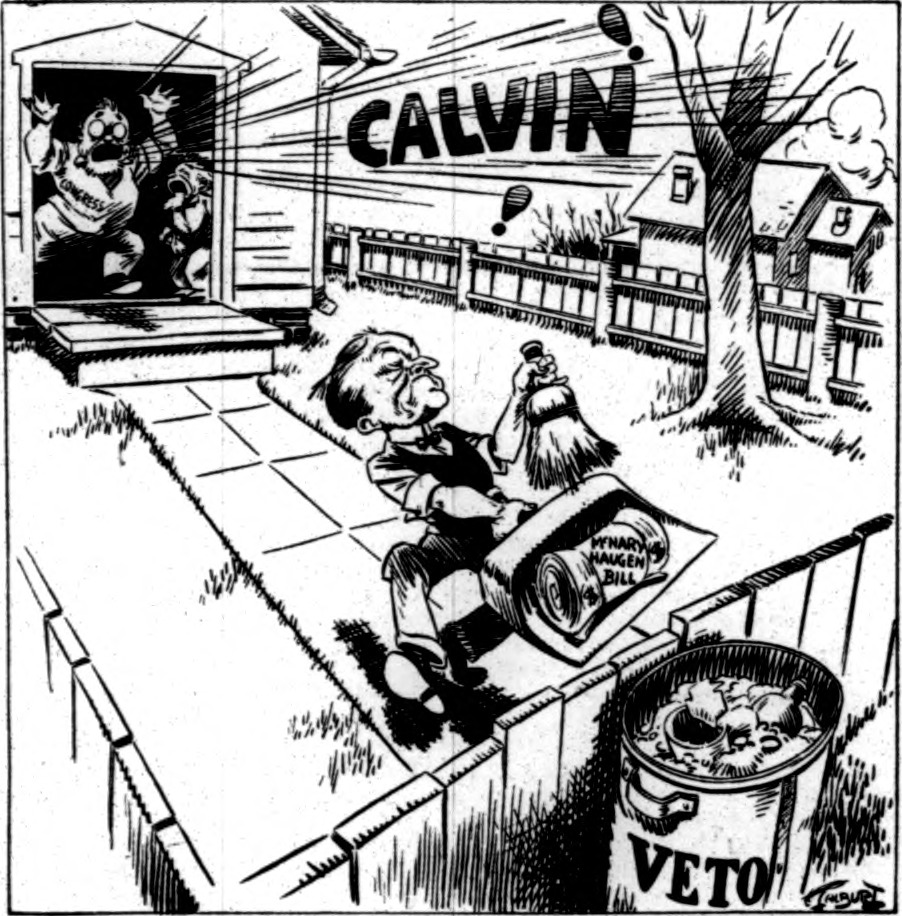
Cartoon showing U.S. President Calvin Coolidge carrying the McNary–Haugen Farm Relief Bill in a dustpan out to a trash can labeled "VETO"

Economics has been defined as the study of resource allocation under scarcity. Agricultural economics, or the application of economic methods to optimize the decisions made by agricultural producers, grew to prominence around the turn of the 20th century. The field of agricultural economics can be traced back to works on land economics. Henry Charles Taylor was the greatest contributor in this period, with the establishment of the Department of Agricultural Economics at the University of Wisconsin in 1909.

Another contributor, 1979 Nobel Economics Prize winner Theodore Schultz, was among the first to examine development economics as a problem related directly to agriculture. Schultz was also instrumental in establishing econometrics as a tool for use in analyzing agricultural economics empirically; he noted in his landmark 1956 article that agricultural supply analysis is rooted in "shifting sand", implying that it was and is simply not being done correctly.

One scholar in the field, Ford Runge, summarizes the development of agricultural economics as follows:

Agricultural economics arose in the late 19th century, combined the theory of the firm with marketing and organization theory, and developed throughout the 20th century largely as an empirical branch of general economics. The discipline was closely linked to empirical applications of mathematical statistics and made early and significant contributions to econometric methods. In the 1960s and afterwards, as agricultural sectors in the OECD countries contracted, agricultural economists were drawn to the development problems of poor countries, to the trade and macroeconomic policy implications of agriculture in rich countries, and to a variety of production, consumption, and environmental and resource problems.

Agricultural economists have made many well-known contributions to the economics field with such models as the cobweb model, hedonic regression pricing models, new technology and diffusion models (Zvi Griliches), multifactor productivity and efficiency theory and measurement, and the random coefficients regression. The farm sector is frequently cited as a prime example of the perfect competition economic paradigm.

In Asia, the Faculty of Agricultural Economics was established in September 1919 in Hokkaido Imperial University, Japan, as Tokyo Imperial University's School of Agriculture started a faculty on agricultural economics in its second department of agricultural science.

In the Philippines, agricultural economics was offered first by the University of the Philippines Los Baños Department of Agricultural Economics in 1919. Today, the field of agricultural economics has transformed into a more integrative discipline which covers farm management and production economics, rural finance and institutions, agricultural marketing and prices, agricultural policy and development, food and nutrition economics, and environmental and natural resource economics.

Since the 1970s, agricultural economics has primarily focused on seven main topics, according to Ford Runge: agricultural environment and resources; risk and uncertainty; food and consumer economics; prices and incomes; market structures; trade and development; and technical change and human capital.

== Major topics in agricultural economics ==
=== Agricultural environment and natural resources ===
In the field of environmental economics, agricultural economists have contributed in three main areas: designing incentives to control environmental externalities (such as water pollution due to agricultural production), estimating the value of non-market benefits from natural resources and environmental amenities (such as an appealing rural landscape), and the complex interrelationship between economic activities and environmental consequences. With regard to natural resources, agricultural economists have developed quantitative tools for improving land management, preventing erosion, managing pests, protecting biodiversity, and preventing livestock diseases.

=== Food and consumer economics ===
While at one time, the field of agricultural economics was focused primarily on farm-level issues, in recent years agricultural economists have studied diverse topics related to the economics of food consumption. In addition to economists' long-standing emphasis on the effects of prices and incomes, researchers in this field have studied how information and quality attributes influence consumer behavior. Agricultural economists have contributed to understanding how households make choices between purchasing food or preparing it at home, how food prices are determined, definitions of poverty thresholds, how consumers respond to price and income changes in a consistent way, and survey and experimental tools for understanding consumer preferences.

=== Production economics and farm management ===
Agricultural economics research has addressed diminishing returns in agricultural production, as well as farmers' costs and supply responses. Much research has applied economic theory to farm-level decisions. Studies of risk and decision-making under uncertainty have real-world applications to crop insurance policies and to understanding how farmers in developing countries make choices about technology adoption. These topics are important for understanding prospects for producing sufficient food for a growing world population, subject to new resource and environmental challenges such as water scarcity and global climate change.

=== Development economics ===
Development economics is broadly concerned with the improvement of living conditions in low-income countries, and the improvement of economic performance in low-income settings. Because agriculture is a large part of most developing economies, both in terms of employment and share of GDP, agricultural economists have been at the forefront of empirical research on development economics, contributing to our understanding of agriculture's role in economic development, economic growth and structural transformation. Many agricultural economists are interested in the food systems of developing economies, the linkages between agriculture and nutrition, and the ways in which agriculture interact with other domains, such as the natural environment.

== Professional associations ==
The International Association of Agricultural Economists (IAAE) is a worldwide professional association, which holds its major conference every three years. The association publishes the journal Agricultural Economics. There also is a European Association of Agricultural Economists (EAAE), an African Association of Agricultural Economists (AAAE) and an Australian Agricultural and Resource Economics Society. Substantial work in agricultural economics internationally is conducted by the International Food Policy Research Institute.

Many countries have their own societies. In the United States, for example, the primary professional association is the Agricultural & Applied Economics Association (AAEA), which holds its own annual conference and also co-sponsors the annual meetings of the Allied Social Sciences Association (ASSA). The AAEA publishes the American Journal of Agricultural Economics and Applied Economic Perspectives and Policy. In the United Kingdom the Agricultural Economics Society dates back to 1926. It too has an annual residential conference. It publishes the Journal of Agricultural Economics and, with the European Association of Agricultural Economists, EuroChoices.

== Careers in agricultural economics ==
Graduates from agricultural and applied economics departments find jobs in many sectors of the economy: agricultural management, agribusiness, agricultural marketing, education, the financial sector, government, natural resource and environmental management, real estate, and public relations. Careers in agricultural economics require at least a bachelor's degree, and research careers in the field require graduate-level training; see Masters in Agricultural Economics. A 2011 study by the Georgetown Center on Education and the Workforce rated agricultural economics tied for 8th out of 171 fields in terms of employability.

== Literature ==
- Evenson, Robert E. and Prabhu Pingali (eds.) (2007). Handbook of Agricultural Economics. Amsterdam, NL: Elsevier.

== See also ==
- Agrarian law
- Agrarian reform
- Agribusiness
- Agricultural recession
- Agricultural value chain
- Development economics
- DIRTI 5
- Electrical energy efficiency on United States farms
- Food grading
- Food security
- Land economics
- Subsidizing
- Transport economics
- Vertical archipelago
