= The Korean Economic Review =

- Discipline: General-interest economics
- Language: English
- Edited by: Kwanho Shin, Manjong Lee, Chang Kim

Publication details
- History: 1985–present
- Publisher: Korean Economic Association (South Korea)
- Frequency: Biannual
- Open access: Yes

Standard abbreviations
- ISO 4: Korean Econ. Rev.

Indexing
- ISSN: 0254-3737

Links
- Journal homepage; Online archive

The Korean Economic Review is a biannual peer-reviewed academic journal on economics. It is published by the Korean Economic Association and was established in 1985. It is a general interest economics journal. It is published twice a year, on January 1 and July 1 of every year. The editors-in-chief are Kwanho Shin, Manjong Lee (Korea University), and Chang Kim (Sik Sungkyunkwan University).
