= Applied Econometrics and International Development =

- Discipline: Econometrics, Development studies
- Language: English
- Edited by: María del Carmen Guisán

Publication details
- History: 2001-2024
- Publisher: Euro-American Association of Economic Development Studies
- Frequency: Biannual
- Open access: Yes

Standard abbreviations
- ISO 4: Appl. Econom. Int. Dev.

Indexing
- ISSN: 1578-4487
- OCLC no.: 436793715

Links
- Journal homepage

Applied Econometrics and International Development is a biannual peer-reviewed academic journal covering econometrics published by the Euro-American Association of Economic Development Studies. The journal was established in 2001 and ceased in 2024. The founding editor was María del Carmen Guisán. Its scientific advisory board included Jurgen Brauer and Nobel Laureate Lawrence Klein.

== Abstracting and indexing ==
The journal is abstracted and indexed in DIALNET, EconLit, International Bibliography of the Social Sciences, Latindex, and Scopus.
