= South Asian Journal of Macroeconomics and Public Finance =

- Discipline: Macroeconomics
- Language: English
- Edited by: Sugata Marjit

Publication details
- History: 2012
- Publisher: SAGE Publications (India)
- Frequency: Bi-annual

Standard abbreviations
- ISO 4: South Asian J. Macroecon. Public Finance

Indexing
- ISSN: 2277-9787 (print); 2321-0273 (web)

Links
- Journal homepage; Online access; Online archive

South Asian Journal of Macroeconomics and Public Finance is a peer-reviewed journal that provides a forum for discussion on issues relating to contemporary global macroeconomics and public finance.

This journal is a member of the Committee on Publication Ethics (COPE).

== Abstracting and indexing ==
South Asian Journal of Macroeconomics and Public Finance is abstracted and indexed in:

- EBSCO: EconLit
- DeepDyve
- J-Gate
- Research Papers in Economics (RePEc)
- ProQuest: Worldwide Political Science Abstracts
