= EuroChoices =

- Discipline: Agriculture
- Language: English

Publication details
- History: 2001-Present
- Publisher: Wiley-Blackwell on behalf of the Agricultural Economics Society and the European Association of Agricultural Economists.
- Frequency: Triannual

Standard abbreviations
- ISO 4: EuroChoices

Indexing
- ISSN: 1478-0917 (print); 1746-692X (web)

Links
- Journal homepage; Online access; Online archive

EuroChoices is a peer-reviewed academic journal published thrice annually by Wiley-Blackwell on behalf of the Agricultural Economics Society and the European Association of Agricultural Economists. The journal was established in 2001. The journal covers agricultural and rural research, ideas and policy deliberation. The journal was founded in order to engage with the changes in European agri-food industries and rural areas.
