= Applied Economic Perspectives and Policy =

- Discipline: Applied economics
- Language: English

Publication details
- Former names: Illinois Agricultural Economics; North Central Journal of Agricultural Economics; Review of Agricultural Economics
- History: 1979–present
- Publisher: Wiley
- Frequency: Quarterly

Standard abbreviations
- ISO 4: Appl. Econ. Perspect. Policy

Indexing
- ISSN: 1058-7195

Links
- Journal homepage

Applied Economic Perspectives and Policy (AEPP) is a peer-reviewed journal of applied economics and policy. Published four times per year, it is the one of two journals published by the Agricultural & Applied Economics Association (AAEA), along with the American Journal of Agricultural Economics (AJAE). Today is the leading journal in 'applied economics' with a 2020 impact factor of 4.083.

The purpose of AEPP is to analyze areas of current applied economic research in an effort to inform the policy-makers and decision makers; and to generate connections between sub-fields of agricultural and applied economics in order to focus future research and increase knowledge of those in the field about the impact of public policy.

== History ==
Applied Economic Perspectives and Policy was first published as the Illinois Agricultural Economics from 1961 to 1978. It then changed its name to the North Central Journal of Agricultural Economics from 1979 to 1990, and then Review of Agricultural Economics from 1991 to 2009. It took its current name in 2010, in order to appeal to a wider audience. In addition to changing the name, the focus of the journal changed as well.

== Editors ==
The current editors of the AEPP are Craig Gundersen from the Baylor University, Mindy Mallory from the Purdue University Purdue University and Daniel Petrolia from Mississippi State University.
