= Series of Unsurprising Results in Economics =

- Discipline: Economics
- Language: English
- Edited by: Andrea K. Menclova

Publication details
- History: 2019–present
- Publisher: University of Canterbury (New Zealand)
- Open access: Yes
- License: Creative Commons Attribution

Standard abbreviations
- ISO 4: Ser. Unsurpris. Results Econ.

Indexing
- ISSN: 2538-1253

Links
- Journal homepage

Series of Unsurprising Results in Economics (SURE) is an academic journal about economics published by University of Canterbury.

The journal's purpose is to provide an outlet for valid research papers about economics that endeavors to counter a publication bias favoring research that contains sensational findings.

Instead, reliable research with relatively low-key results is the focus to provide a legitimate forum for it that otherwise would be rejected by other editors.
