= Agricultural Economics (journal) =

Journal

- Discipline: Agricultural, Economics
- Language: English

Publication details
- Publisher: Wiley-Blackwell
- Frequency: 8/year

Standard abbreviations
- ISO 4: Agric. Econ.

Indexing
- CODEN: AGECE6
- ISSN: 1574-0862 (print); 0169-5150 (web)
- LCCN: 98643541

Links
- Journal homepage

Agricultural Economics is the peer-reviewed academic journal of the International Association of Agricultural Economists, published 8 times per a year by Wiley-Blackwell.
