= Journal of Economic Literature =

- Discipline: Economics
- Language: English
- Edited by: Steven Durlauf

Publication details
- Former name: Journal of Economic Abstracts
- History: 1963–present
- Publisher: American Economic Association (United States)
- Frequency: Quarterly

Standard abbreviations
- ISO 4: J. Econ. Lit.

Indexing
- CODEN: JECLB3
- ISSN: 0022-0515
- LCCN: 73646621
- JSTOR: 00220515
- OCLC no.: 01788942

Links
- Journal homepage; Online archive

The Journal of Economic Literature is a peer-reviewed academic journal, published by the American Economic Association, that surveys the academic literature in economics. It was established by Arthur Smithies in 1963 as the Journal of Economic Abstracts, and is currently one of the highest-ranked journals in economics. As a review journal, it mainly features essays and reviews of recent economic theories (as opposed to the latest research). The editor-in-chief is Steven Durlauf. In January 2022, the AEA announced that David Romer would become the editor beginning in July 2022.

The journal originated a widely used classification system for publications in the field of economics.

== See also ==
- JEL classification codes
