= EconLit =

- Producer: American Economic Association (United States)

Access
- Providers: EBSCO, ProQuest, Ovid
- Cost: Subscription

Coverage
- Disciplines: Economics
- Record depth: Index & abstract
- Temporal coverage: 1886-present

Links
- Website: www.aeaweb.org/econlit/index.php
- Title list(s): www.aeaweb.org/econlit/journal_list.php

EconLit is an academic literature abstracting database service published by the American Economic Association. The service focuses on literature in the field of economics. EconLit covers articles and other materials dating back to 1969. It uses the JEL classification codes for classifying papers by subject.

== See also ==
- List of academic databases and search engines
