= Dieckmann =

Dieckmann is a surname, and may refer to:

- August Dieckmann (1912-1943), German colonel
- Bärbel Dieckmann (born 1949), German politician
- Carolina Dieckmann (born 1978), Brazilian actress
- Christina Dieckmann (born 1977), Venezuelan actress
- Christoph Dieckmann (beach volleyball) (born 1976), German beach volleyball player
- Ed Dieckmann, Netherlands musician
- Johannes Dieckmann (1893-1969), East German politician
- Katherine Dieckmann, American film director
- Markus Dieckmann (born 1976), German beach volleyball player
- Walter Dieckmann (1869-1925), German chemist
