= Annual Review of Resource Economics =

- Discipline: Economics
- Language: English
- Edited by: Gordon Rausser; David Zilberman

Publication details
- History: 2009–present, 17 years old
- Publisher: Annual Reviews (US)
- Frequency: Annually
- Open access: Subscribe to Open
- Impact factor: 7.5 (2025)

Standard abbreviations
- ISO 4: Annu. Rev. Resour. Econ.

Indexing
- ISSN: 1941-1340 (print); 1941-1359 (web)

Links
- Journal homepage

The Annual Review of Resource Economics peer-reviewed academic journal that publishes an annual volume of review articles relevant to natural resource economics. It was established in 2009 and is published by the nonprofit organization Annual Reviews (AR). The current co-editors are Gordon Rausser and David Zilberman. As of 2023, it is being published as open access, under the Subscribe to Open model.

== History ==
Annual Reviews (AR) is a nonprofit organization whose stated mission is to synthesize knowledge "for the progress of science and the benefit of society." AR first published the Annual Review of Resource Economics in 2009 along with the Annual Review of Economics and the Annual Review of Financial Economics. The founding editor was Gordon Rausser. David Zilberman, initially an associate editor, is credited as co-editor with Rausser in issues from 2019 onwards. As of 2021, the journal is published both in print and electronically.

== Scope and indexing ==
It defines its scope as covering significant developments in the field of natural resource economics, including facets such as agricultural economics, environmental economics, renewable resources, and non-renewable resources. As of 2026, Journal Citation Reports lists the journal's 2025 impact factor as 7.5, ranking it first of 45 journal titles in the category "Agricultural Economics and Policy", twentieth of 626 in "Economics", and twenty-fifth of 202 in "Environmental Studies". It is abstracted and indexed in Scopus, Science Citation Index Expanded, Social Sciences Citation Index, and EconLit, among others.

== Editorial processes ==
The Annual Review of Resource Economics is helmed by the editor or the co-editors. The editor is assisted by the editorial committee, which includes associate editors, regular members, and occasionally guest editors. Guest members participate at the invitation of the editor, and serve terms of one year. All other members of the editorial committee are appointed by the AR board of directors and serve five-year terms. The editorial committee determines which topics should be included in each volume and solicits reviews from qualified authors. Unsolicited manuscripts are not accepted. Peer review of accepted manuscripts is undertaken by the editorial committee.

=== Current editorial board ===
As of 2021, the editorial committee consists of the two co-editors and the following members:

- Thomas W. Hertel
- Matin Qaim
- Kathleen Segerson
- Richard J. Sexton
- Johan Swinnen
- Laura O. Taylor
- Anastasios Xepapadeas
- Jinhua Zhao

== See also ==
- List of economics journals
- List of environmental economics journals
