= Marcelo Ebrard =

Mexican politician (born 1959)

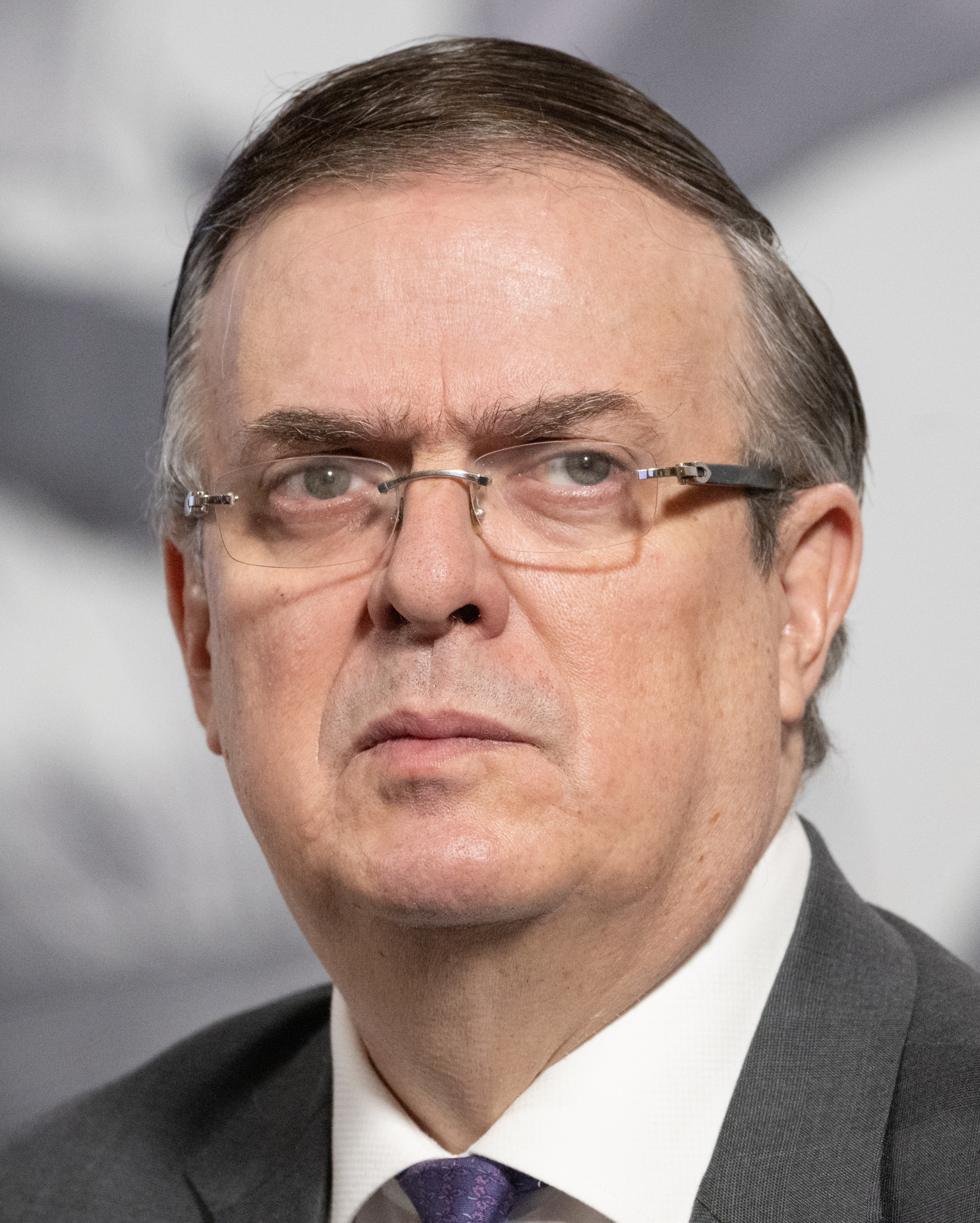
- Ebrard in 2025

Secretary of Economy
- Incumbent
- Assumed office 1 October 2024
- President: Claudia Sheinbaum
- Preceded by: Raquel Buenrostro Sánchez

Secretary of Foreign Affairs
- In office 1 December 2018 – 12 June 2023
- President: Andrés Manuel López Obrador
- Preceded by: Luis Videgaray Caso
- Succeeded by: Alicia Bárcena Ibarra

5th Head of Government of Mexico City
- In office 5 December 2006 – 4 December 2012
- Preceded by: Alejandro Encinas Rodríguez
- Succeeded by: Miguel Ángel Mancera
Other offices
Secretary of Social Development of the Federal District
In office 8 February 2005 – 7 September 2005
Head of Government	Andrés Manuel López Obrador
Preceded by	Raquel Sosa Elízaga
Succeeded by	Martha Pérez Bajarano
Secretary of Public Security of the Federal District
In office 15 February 2002 – 7 November 2004
Head of Government	Andrés Manuel López Obrador
Preceded by	Joel Ortega Cuevas
Succeeded by	Leonel Godoy Rangel
Secretary General of the Democratic Center Party
In office 30 June 1999 – 15 September 2000
Preceded by	Office established
Succeeded by	Office abolished
Member of the Chamber of Deputies
In office 1 September 1997 – 31 August 2000
Constituency	Fourth electoral region

Personal details
- Born: Marcelo Luis Ebrard; 10 October 1959 (age 67) Mexico City, Mexico
- Party: Morena (since 2018)
- Other political affiliations: Party of the Democratic Revolution (2000–2018); Democratic Center Party (1999–2000); Institutional Revolutionary Party (1977–1995)
- Spouses: Francesca Ramos Morgan (m. 1999; div. 2005) Mariagna Pratts (m. 2006; div. 2011) Rosalinda Bueso (m. 2011)
- Children: Anne Dominique Ebrard; Francesca Ebrard; Marcelo Ebrard, Jr. Ivanna Ebrard; Julián Ebrard
- Parent(s): Marcelo Ebrard, Sr. Marcela Casaubón
- Education: El Colegio de México (BA); National School of Administration (MA)

Marcelo Luis Ebrard Casaubón (Spanish: [maɾˈselo eˈβɾaɾð]; born 10 October 1959) is a Mexican politician and internationalist who has served as the secretary of economy since 2024. A member of the National Regeneration Movement (Morena), he previously served as secretary of foreign affairs under President Andrés Manuel López Obrador from 2018 to 2023. He served as Head of Government of the Federal District (Mexico City) from 2006 to 2012.

Ebrard won the 2006 Federal District election as a Democratic Revolution Party (PRD)-led electoral alliance. As mayor, Ebrard presided over the creation of the Ecobici mobility system, the Prepa Sí program that grants scholarships to low-income students, and revival projects in the city's historic center. While in office, he served as secretary-general of the former Federal District Department, minister of public security, and minister of social development of the Mexican capital. In 2010, Ebrard was nominated as the "world's best mayor" by the Project World Mayor. After leaving office, he served as president of the United Nations Global Network on Safer Cities. From 2009 to 2012, he was the chair of the World Mayors Council on Climate Change.

During his mayoralty, Ebrard was seen as a likely future presidential candidate. In 2012, Ebrard ran for the PRD's nomination for President, ultimately losing to López Obrador. In June 2023, Ebrard resigned from his position as secretary of foreign affairs to run for President in the 2024 election, but lost Morena's nomination to Claudia Sheinbaum. On 20 June 2024, President-elect Sheinbaum announced that Ebrard would serve as secretary of economy in her cabinet beginning 1 October 2024.

== Early life and education ==
A descendant of the French emigrant wave from Barcelonnette in 1915, Ebrard is the son of architect Marcelo Ebrard Maure and Marcela Casaubón. He received a bachelor's degree in international relations from El Colegio de México. He specialized in public administration and planning at France's École nationale d'administration.

== Early political career ==
Ebrard became a member of the Institutional Revolutionary Party (PRI) in 1978. After volunteering in the presidential campaigns of 1976 and 1982, serving as an advisor to the general secretary in 1988, and being elected to the Chamber of Deputies.

=== Democratic Center Party of Mexico and AMLO ===
Ebrard left the PRI along with Manuel Camacho Solís in 1995 to found the now-defunct Party of the Democratic Center (PCD). A centrist party that sought to expose nationalism and democracy as its principles. The party participated in the 2000 elections with Camacho as a candidate for the presidency and Ebrard as a candidate for the government of the Federal District. Ebrard, who achieved some acceptance as a candidate, declined in March 2000 in favor of Andrés Manuel López Obrador, candidate of the PRD and the so-called Alliance for Mexico City (PRD/PT/Convergencia/PSN/PAS) to Mexico City.

=== AMLO's Government in Mexico CIty ===
In 2000 he briefly campaigned for the 2000 Head of Government election for the PCD before stepping down in March 2000 and throwing his support behind Andrés Manuel López Obrador as the candidate of the multi-party Alliance for Mexico City. Following the election, he joined López Obrador's cabinet as secretary of public security in 2002 after the resignation of Leonel Godoy as head of this agency. During this period, crime and delinquency fell by 9.2%, reaching the lowest daily average in a decade. He launched the creation of new police groups, such as the Citizen Protection Program and the Cardholder Crime Protection Unit.

He became a member of the Party of the Democratic Revolution on 12 September 2004.

=== 2004–2006 ===
Ebrard, the city's chief of police, and Ramón Huerta, the Federal Secretary of Public Safety, were accused of not organizing a timely rescue effort when three undercover federal police officers were lynched by a mob in one of the capital's most impoverished suburbs in Tláhuac on 23 November 2004. After a thorough investigation, López Obrador gave Ebrard a vote of confidence, despite a request from President Fox that López Obrador relieve him of his duties.

Later, with constitutional power, Fox fired Ebrard, with the latter describing the dismissal as politically motivated. Other critics also viewed the firing as a politically motivated move to derail Ebrard's political future. Huerta was also implicated in the incident, yet Fox gave Huerta his full support, and did not remove him from office. For this incident, Ebrard was put under investigation, as were the federal authorities who also failed to act. He was later reinstated as Secretary of Social Development by López Obrador.

On 8 July 2006, the French newspaper Le Monde ran an article indicating that Ebrard was an emerging leader of the Mexican Left. Manuel Camacho Solís, of whom Ebrard was a political protégé, had a reputation for running articles in foreign newspapers to indicate his political intentions. Many saw this as an attempt to dismiss López Obrador and now rely on Ebrard to win the presidency in the 2012 presidential elections. On 7 December 2010, he was awarded the World Mayor prize in recognition of his environmental and civil-rights initiatives within the Federal District.

== Head of Government of the Federal District (2006–2012) ==
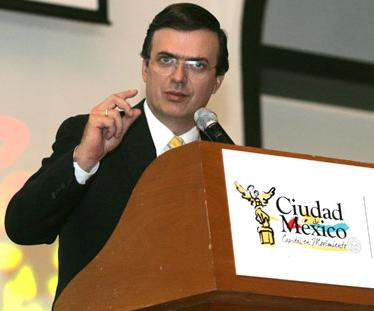
Marcelo Ebrard at a daily conference held at Federal District City Hall.

Ebrard ran as the PRD's candidate for Head of Government in the Federal District election held on 2 July 2006, winning 47% of the votes.

He continued and expanded programs that López Obrador had initiated. A new initiative was the Prepa Sí program, granting low-income students scholarships. This reduced the school-dropout rate in the city to 6% and raised the grade point average from 7.2 to 8.2.

He expanded pensions for the elderly so that it was a right of every inhabitant of Mexico City who had reached 68 years of age, sending an initiative to the Legislative Assembly of the Federal District to elevate it to the status of law.

Among his actions having the greatest impact according to public opinion was the expropriation of properties and buildings that functioned as operational centers of crime. This included a property in the Tepito neighborhood, supposedly a drug-trafficking center; a large area of the Iztapalapa delegation, involved in the sale of stolen car parts, and two more drug sales properties in Santa María la Ribera. Although some in the business sector criticized these actions as an attack on private property — actions that received the support of the federal government — the initiative to seize ownership of these properties, as well as the introduction of video surveillance cameras, together with social development, helped reduce the crime index by 11% in Mexico City compared to 2006. He also created a special intelligence unit to fight against money laundering.

Ebrard made significant changes to the Historic Center, returning it to the citizens of Mexico City and its visitors by relocating the street vendors beginning in mid-2007. The press classified his action as one of his government's successes since informal traders had significantly increased their numbers in recent years. Some people criticized the decision of one of its dependencies to demolish historic buildings in the city center to enable the relocation of street vendors. However, it was supported by the National Institute of Anthropology and History. He also rehabilitated the Monument to the Revolution and the Alameda.

In the area of health, he built hospitals in Tláhuac, Iztapalapa, and Tlalpan and promoted the development of medical specialties that did not exist in Mexico City's public health system.

During his mandate, he was recognized for his actions in the fight against climate change, the construction of mobility infrastructure, the transformation of public transport with the EcoBici (bike sharing) system; the expansion by 350% of the Metrobús system and the construction of Metro Line 12.

In 2009 he was named president of the World Mayors Council on Climate Change, and in 2010 he received the World Mayor award from the City Mayors Foundation.

Ebrard has stated that one of his goals is reviving the Nahuatl language. His plan calls for city workers to learn the language as an initial effort at reviving the language.

Marcelo Ebrard was the first head of government of the Federal District to complete his six-year term, which began on 5 December 2006 and ended on 5 December 2012.

He left office with a 63% approval rating.

== Post-Head of Government tenure ==
=== 2012 presidential election ===
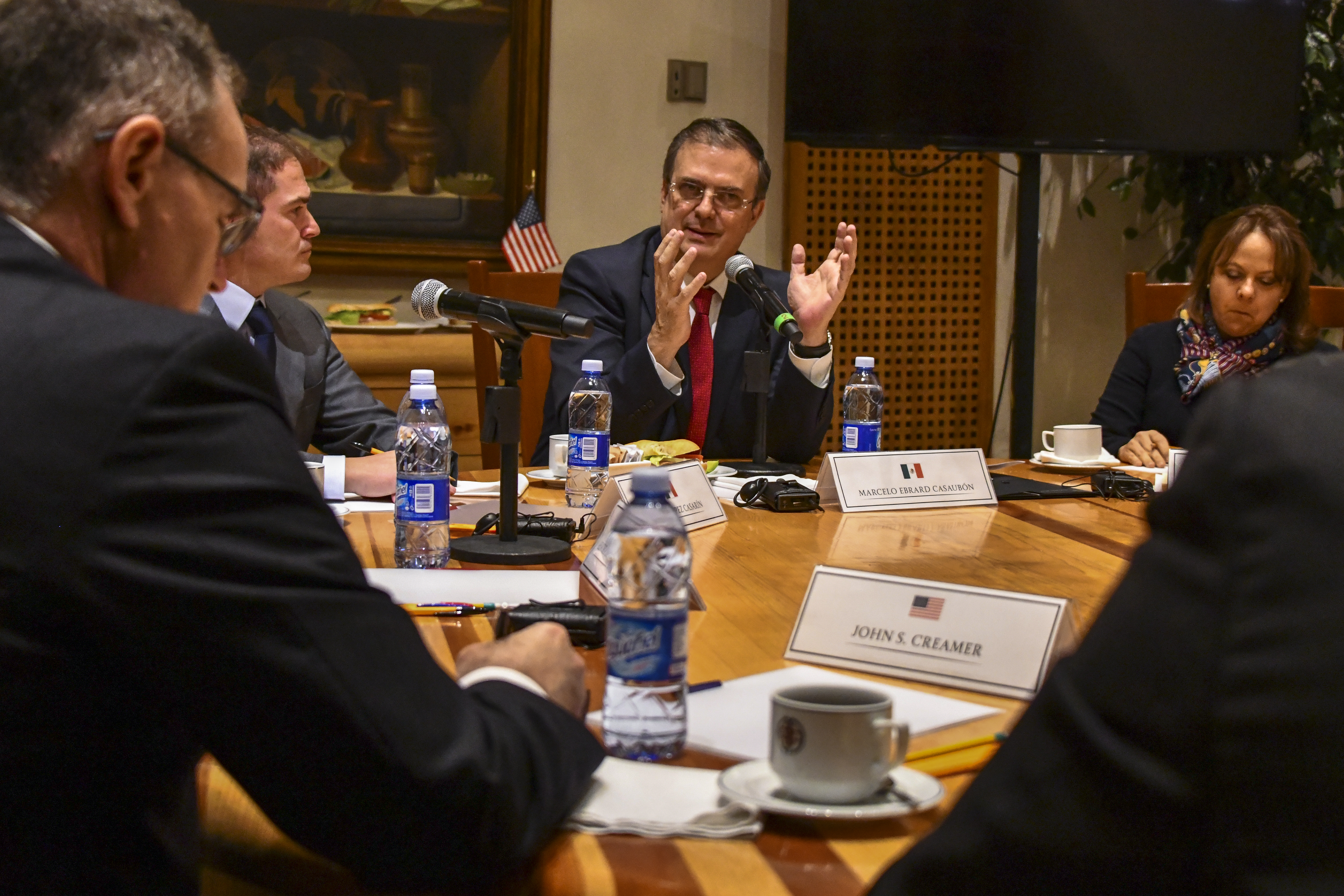
U.S. Secretary of State Michael R. Pompeo participates in a bilateral meeting with Mexican Foreign Secretary-designate Marcelo Ebrard in Mexico City on 19 October 2018.

On 30 March 2010, Ebrard publicly announced his intention to contest his party's candidacy for the presidency in 2012. As a pre-campaign platform, he founded his Progressive Vanguard movement. On 11 June 2011, Jesús Ortega's Nueva Izquierda faction within the PRD named him the party's presidential candidate. In contrast, the National Democratic Left faction, led by Dolores Padierna Luna, ruled in favor of Andrés Manuel López Obrador. On 15 November 2011, it was announced that the method to select a candidate for the presidency in 2012 would be a series of polls, which made López Obrador the winner. Ebrard refused to compete for the candidacy in 2012. As a formal presidential candidate, López Obrador proposed that Ebrard would be made Secretary of the Interior if he won the presidential elections but he lost.

=== President of Global Network of Safer Cities ===
In September 2012, Ebrard was elected to serve as president of the United Nations Global Network on Safer Cities which is part of the Urban Initiatives through the United Nations. He resigned his position on 3 February 2014, in order to contend for the Presidency of the PRD.

== López Obrador and Sheinbaum cabinets ==
=== Secretary of Foreign Affairs ===
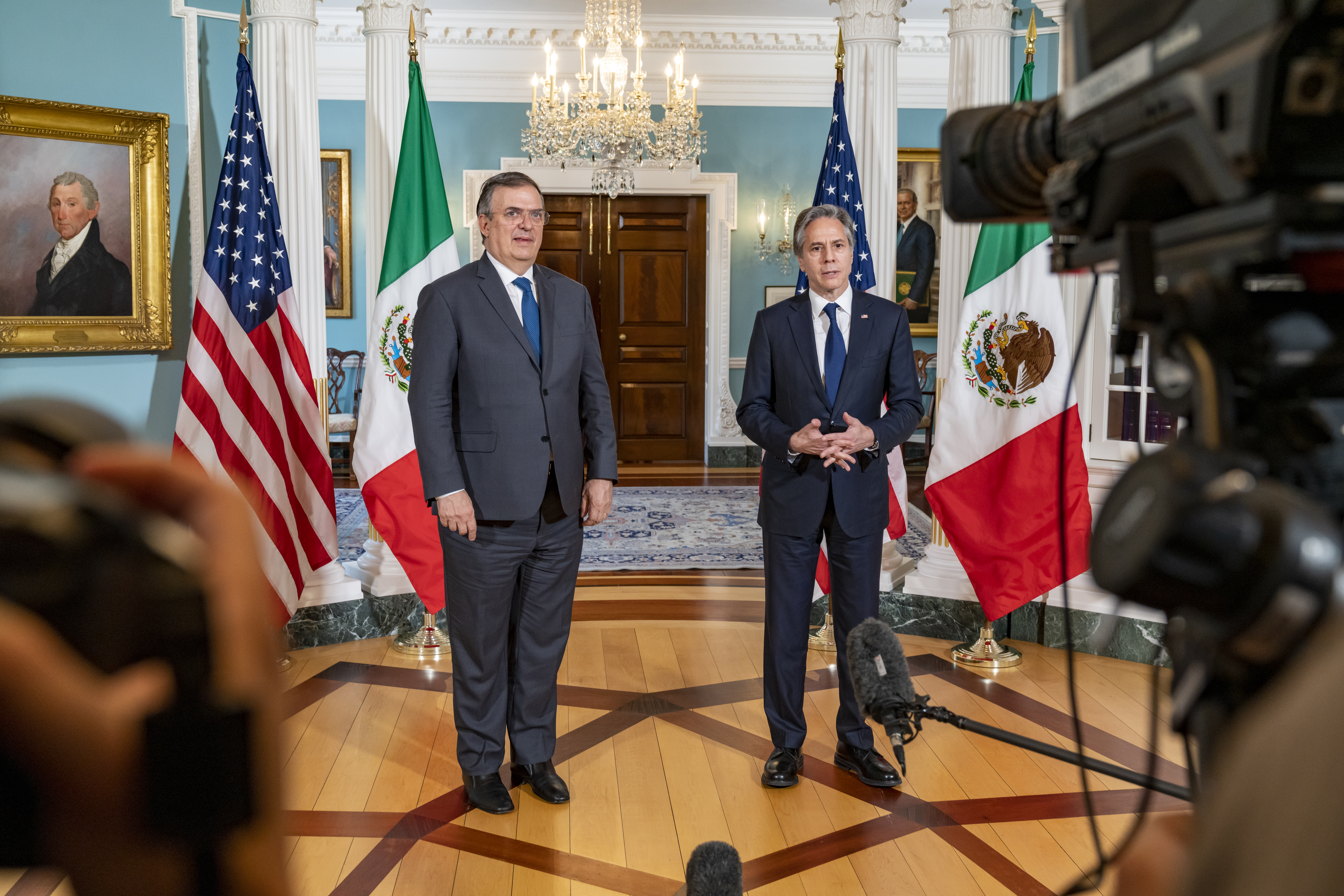
Marcelo Ebrard meets with U.S. Secretary of State Antony Blinken in Washington, D.C., on 3 May 2022

Ebrard was part of López Obrador's 2018 campaign team, responsible for outreach in Mexico's northwestern states. After López Obrador won the election on 1 July 2018, he was announced as the Secretary of Foreign Affairs a couple of days later, replacing Héctor Vasconcelos, who instead became a Senator.

During the resignation of former-Bolivian President Evo Morales and his government in November 2019, Ebrard viewed the situation as a coup and offered political asylum to Morales.

As Secretary of Foreign Affairs, Ebrard publicly condemned the Russian invasion of Ukraine in February 2022. Citing Mexico's history as a country that experienced foreign invasion, Ebrard stated "we have to strongly reject and condemn the invasion of a country like Ukraine by a power like Russia".

In 2023, Ebrard presided over the issuing of Mexico's first-ever non-binary passport on the International Day Against Homophobia, Biphobia and Transphobia.

=== 2024 presidential election ===
In June 2023, Ebrard resigned as foreign secretary to seek the presidential nomination of the MORENA party for the 2024 general election. However, before the party decided its candidate, Ebrard threatened to resign from Morena. Later on, Ebrard lost the party's nomination to Claudia Sheinbaum in September 2023.

Ebrard lodged a complaint against Sheinbaum's nomination victory in September 2023, claiming irregularities in the nomination process. In 2023, he received speculation that he would leave Morena to join the Citizens' Movement.

In March 2024, months ahead of the election, it was reported that Ebrard supported Sheinbaum's candidacy in the general election. Ebrard subsequently contended for a seat in the Senate in the same election.

=== Secretary of the Economy ===
On 20 June 2024, president-elect Sheinbaum announced Ebrard's appointment to serve as Secretary of the Economy in her cabinet as of 1 October 2024. Considered a moderate member of MORENA, his appointment as Secretary of the Economy led the peso to rise as high as 0.9% against the United States dollar.

== Political views ==
Ebrard was characterized as "centrist" by Reuters, who described his political orientation as "socially progressive and eager to put Mexico on the world stage". Ebrard has been described as an economic moderate.

The Associated Press reported that, "while some peg Ebrard as a centrist", Ebard has touted the legalization of same-sex marriage and abortion while leading Mexico City as evidence of his progressive bonafides.

== Personal life ==
He was married to Francesca Ramos Morgan and had two daughters and one son: Francesca, Anne Dominique, and Marcelo Ebrard Ramos. He later divorced and married Mexican soap-opera actress Mariagna Pratts. In April 2011, Marcelo Ebrard announced his divorce from Pratts through an official press release.

On 7 October 2011, Ebrard married for the third time to Rosalinda Bueso, the former Honduran ambassador to Mexico.

Political offices
Preceded by Joel Ortega Cuevas	Secretary of Public Security of the Federal District; 2002–2004	Succeeded by Leonel Godoy Rangel
Preceded by Raquel Sosa Elízaga	Secretary of Social Development of the Federal District; 2005	Succeeded by Martha Pérez Bajarano
Preceded by Alejandro Encinas Rodríguez	Head of Government of the Federal District; 2006–2012	Succeeded by Miguel Ángel Mancera
Preceded by Luis Videgaray Caso	Secretary of Foreign Affairs; 2018–2023	Succeeded by Alicia Bárcena Ibarra
