= Viva con Agua de Sankt Pauli =

German charity

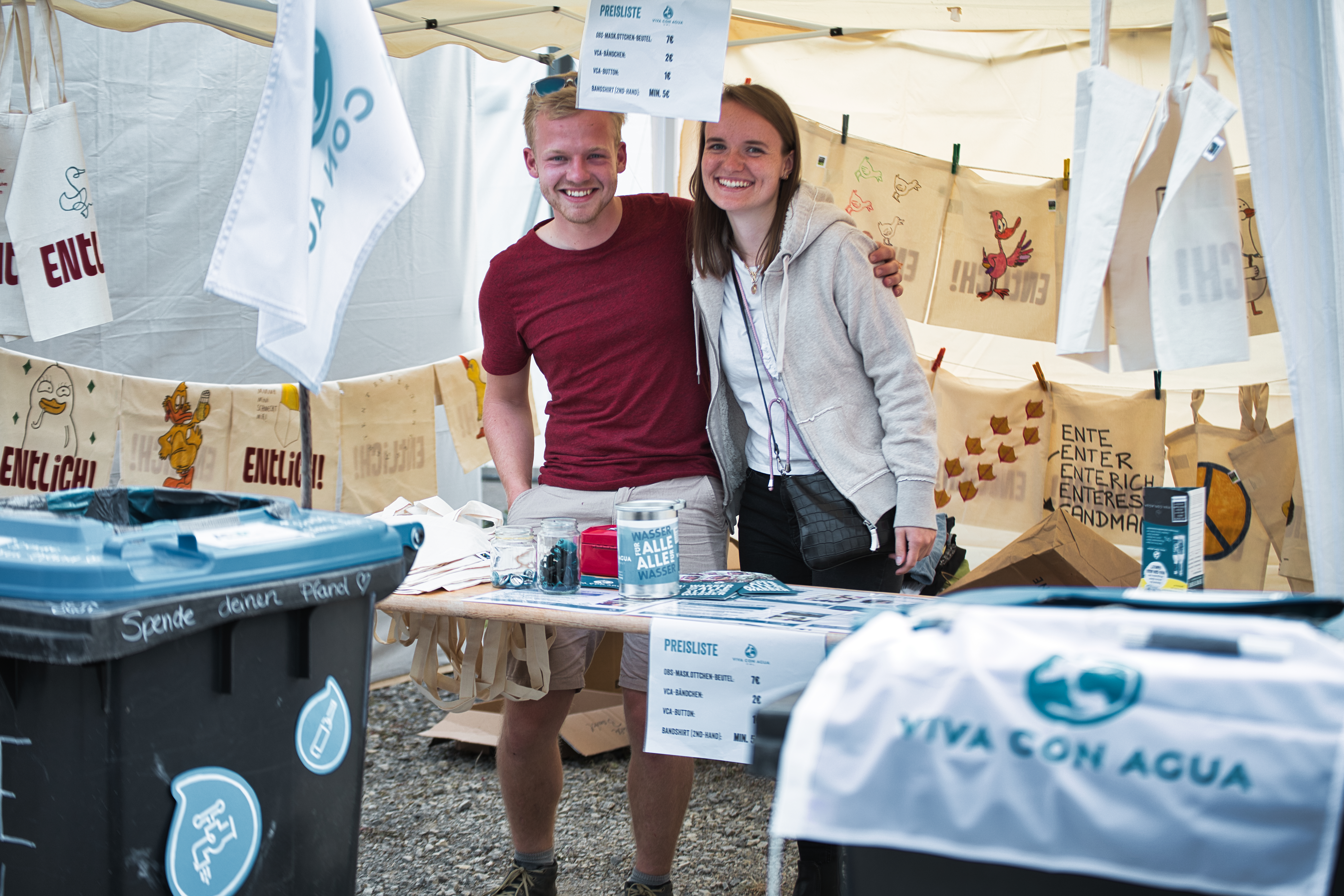
- Established: 2006 (20 years ago)
- Founders: Benjamin Adrion
- Types: charitable corporation
- Legal status: Registered association
- Aim: to improve drinking water supply in developing countries
- Headquarters: Hamburg
- Country: Germany
- Revenue: 4,784,282 euro (2019)
- Employees: 42 (2023)
- Website: www.vivaconagua.org/en/

Viva con Agua de Sankt Pauli (English: Live with Water) is a charity founded in 2006 in the Hamburg quarter of St. Pauli. Viva con Agua is a network of people and organizations committed to establish access to clean drinking water and basic sanitation for all humans worldwide. Creative and joyful activities raise awareness for the global issues water, sanitation, and hygiene (short WASH) and simultaneously raise funds for worldwide water.

The NGO started with a friend circle from Hamburg. Now their offices and locations are not just in Germany, but also in Switzerland, the Netherlands, Austria, Uganda and since 2020 in South Africa and California.

== History ==
In 2005 Benjamin Adrion, at the time a midfield player for the regional league football club FC St. Pauli, returned from a training camp in Havana. There he had seen how poor the supply of fresh drinking water was in Cuba. Back in Hamburg again, he decided to do something about it. He mobilised musicians, football fans and bohemians in the Hamburg district of St. Pauli and launched an appeal for donations.

Among the earliest supporters of the project were prominent figures like the hip-hop musicians of Fettes Brot and Bela B of the punk rock band Die Ärzte.

In cooperation with Welthungerhilfe, it subsequently proved possible to equip 150 kindergartens in Cuba’s capital Havana with water dispensers.

In 2006, Adrion officially founded the organisation Viva con Agua de Sankt Pauli.

When he was 28 years old Benjamin Adrion received the Cross of the Order of Merit of the Federal Republic of Germany in 2009. He accepted the award conferred in recognition of special services rendered for the common good on behalf of every single Viva supporter.

In 2010 the Viva con Agua Foundation was found to secure the idea and the ideals of the NGO in the long term.

== Aim and Structure ==
Viva con Agua de Sankt Pauli e.V. is a non-profit organization from the city district Sankt Pauli in Hamburg, Germany. The organization is built up as an "open network" which means that it mainly consists of individual initiatives with the support of the organization’s head office in Hamburg.

The aim of the association is to provide people in countries with needs with access to drinking water and sanitation.

Therefore the organization acts in conjunction with project partner like the Welthungerhilfe (one of the biggest private aid organisations in Germany) and local partners in the projects country.

Viva con Agua’s firm belief is that even the most serious topics in the world can be battled with joy. Most of the donations are collected through the work at Festival and Dancing Events. The NGO partners up with festival organizer and has mobilized around 15,000 mostly young volunteers. The young volunteers receive free tickets to festival areas, where they collect cups. Usually these cups have a deposit fee of one Euro or more. This way all the festival visitors can easily donate, while partying together. This is way Viva con Agua calls itself an All Profit Organisation.

=== All Profit ===
Viva con Agua wants everybody to benefit from their support, even the volunteers. The focus is on the All Profit idea. Eye level engagement is the key. Viva con Agua does not see their support as a donation, but rather as an investment in water projects and, ultimately, in a better future for all. They want to contribute to a mindset change in society when it comes to a partnership between the northern and southern hemispheres.

Viva con Agua prefers to attract volunteers through art, sport, music. They call those Universal Languages.

=== Projects ===
In 2019 Viva con Agua supported 16 WASH-Projects in ten countries: Ethiopia, Kenya, India; Mozambique, Nepal, Uganda, Sudan, Tanzania, Zimbabwe and Sierra Leone.

Some projects for example focus strongly on local schools. Due to long ways to school, it is of uttermost importance that the schools are equipped with clean drinking water and sanitation facilities. Further, hygiene sensitization is particularly effective with children as they tend to adopt new behaviour quickly. Another huge project is John’s Rig. A drilling machine, which is supposed to drill 196 shallow wells by 2023.

=== Activities ===
Several activities have been organized so far, including a march from Hamburg to the Swiss city of Basel (over 1050 km) in celebration of UEFA Euro 2008 in Austria and Switzerland.

Viva con Agua and its network organize sports tournaments, sponsored runs and parties. German musicians like the rapper Marteria have written songs for Viva con Agua that can be listened to on YouTube.

In spring 2020 Viva con Agua launched #stream4water festival on Instagram to collect donations.

== Social Businesses ==
=== Viva con Agua Wasser GmbH ===
In 2010 the Viva con Agua Wasser GmbH was founded. The so-called social business markets its own brand of mineral water, which is sold in cooperation with regional water bottlers. Sixty per cent of the profits go to water projects.

=== Goldeimer gGmbH ===
Another social business of Viva con Agua begun its life as a start-up: the Goldeimer project. This Kiel-based initiative has been working together with Viva con Agua since 2010 and provides mobile composting toilets for large-scale events. Most of the profits are invested in Viva con Agua’s WASH projects.

Since 2015 they also produce Toilet Paper. 20 Euro Cent of the price of every single package will be donated to Welthungerhilfe sanitation projects. The toilet paper is also important for the b2b business as VcA has a solid distribution and a well working network inside the gastro business in major German cities.

=== Viva con Agua ARTS gGmbH ===
The Millerntor Gallery, an annual art festival held in collaboration with FC St. Pauli, is one example of how Viva con Agua uses the universal languages sport, music, and art. During the festival, street art is on display in the Millerntor stadium by artists from around the world. Millerntor Gallery events now also take place in the Netherlands, Switzerland, and Uganda.

== Accolades ==
- 2006: "startsocial" state winner
- 2006: taz-Panter jury prize for outstanding social commitment for Viva con Agua founder Benjamin Adrion
- 2007: "Germany - Land of Ideas" award
- 2008: Utopia Award – role models
- 2009: Order of Merit of the Federal Republic of Germany for Viva con Agua founder Benjamin Adrion
- 2011: Gala Spa Award – Special Prize
- 2011: B.A.U.M.-Environmental Award
- 2011: Mike Krüger – Maker Contest
- 2012: Utopia Award – Organisations
- 2012: HAMMA Award
- 2015: Next Economy Award
- 2016: Echo Music Prize for social commitment
- 2019: About You Award in the category of Empowerment
- 2020: Club Award Hamburg for Millerntor Gallery
