= UC Berkeley College of Natural Resources =

College of the University of California, Berkeley

Rausser College of Natural Resources
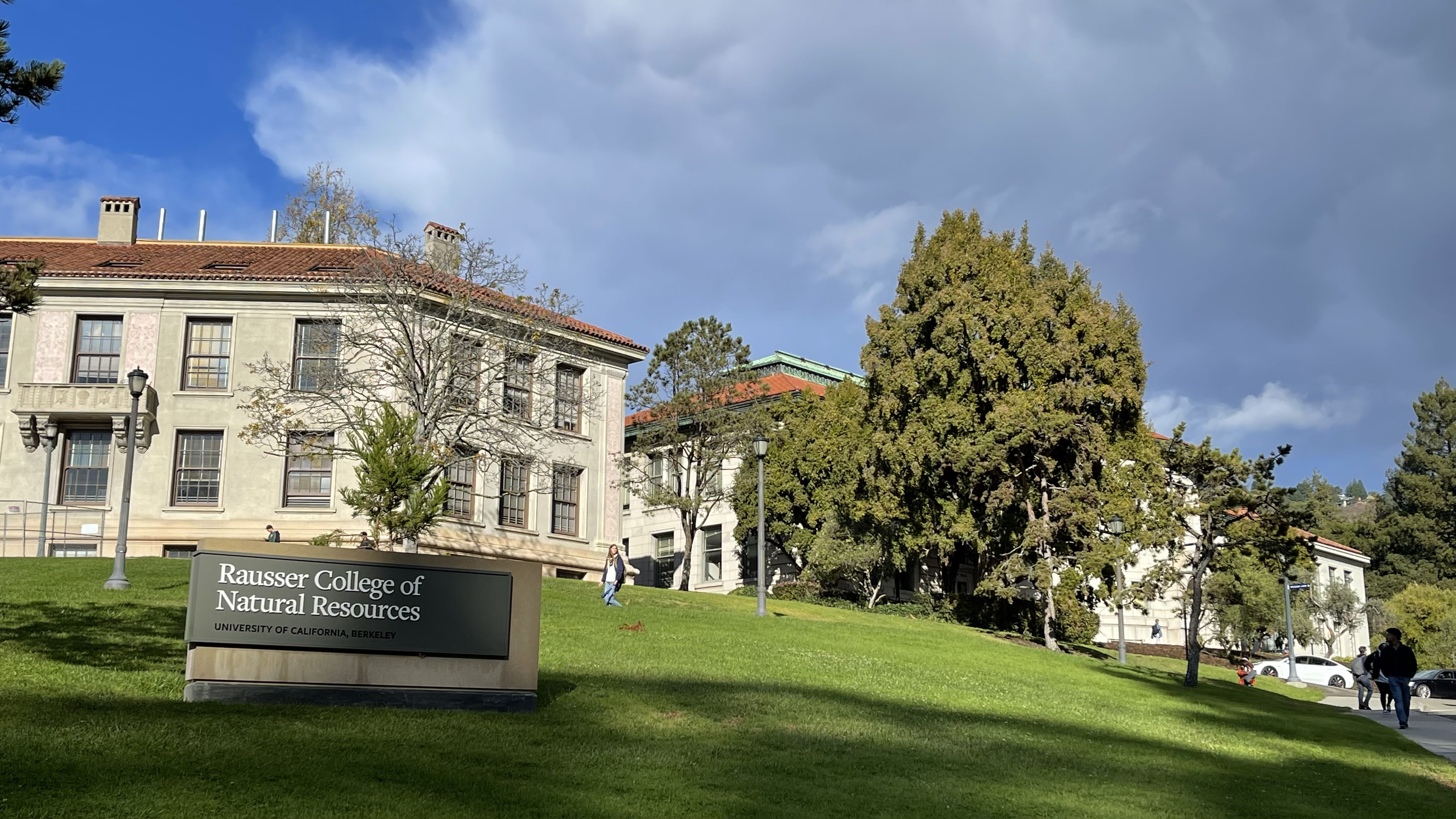
- Wellman and Hilgard Halls, the frontispieces of Rausser College
- Former names: College of Agriculture; College of Natural Resources
- Type: Public professional school
- Established: 1868
- Parent institution: University of California, Berkeley
- Dean: David Ackerly
- Academic staff: 120
- Undergraduates: 2,200
- Postgraduates: 500
- Location: Berkeley, California, United States; 37.872637°N 122.264502°W
- Website: nature.berkeley.edu

The UC Berkeley College of Natural Resources (CNR), formally known as the Rausser College of Natural Resources, is the college for agriculture and environmental studies at the University of California, Berkeley. It was established in 1868 as the College of Agriculture under the federal Morrill Land-Grant Acts.

== History ==
Plans for the creation of this public university were first developed at the 1849 Constitutional Convention, but when the State of California was established in 1850, it lacked the funds necessary to create such a school. Missionaries sent west by the Home Mission Society of New York, however, created the College of California and eventually transferred its ownership to the State in 1855.

By 1862, the State had secured the land necessary to establish a college as a result of the Morrill Act. This college was known as the Agricultural Mining and Mechanical Arts College, and opened formally in 1866.

On March 23, 1868, Governor H.H. Haight combined the resources of this college with the College of California to create the first University of California.

The Board of Regents began admitting women to the University of California in 1871, and the first woman to graduate was Rosa L. Scrivner, with a PhB in Agriculture.

On February 29, 2020, former dean Gordon Rausser made a US$50 million dollar donation to the college, which then changed its name to the Rausser College of Natural Resources in honor of the gift.

== Campus ==
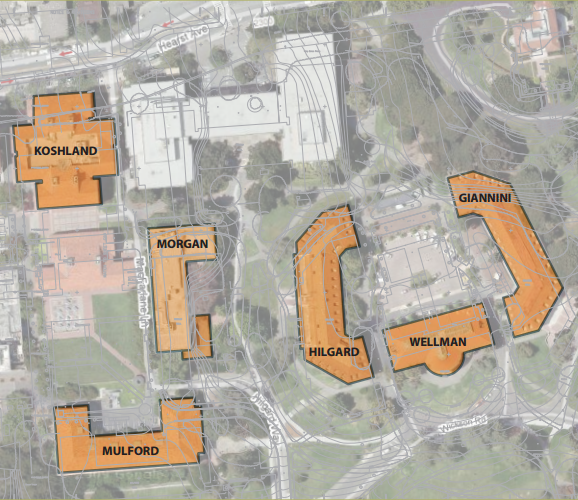
The original College of Agriculture consisted of the Hilgard, Wellman, and Giannini halls. Today, Rausser has expanded to occupy the Koshland, Morgan, and Mulford buildings.

Located on the northwest end of the Berkeley campus, the college comprises six main buildings. These include the historic group of Wellman, Hilgard, and Giannini halls that composed the original college. This trio, known as the Agriculture Complex, is the most unified grouping of buildings on campus. They are on the National Register of Historic Places and are visually unified by a Mediterranean landscape of olive and stone pine trees.

The first hall, Wellman Hall, was designed under neoclassical architecture in 1912 by John Galen Howard. It was named after Harry R. Wellman, professor of agricultural economics and acting president of the university.

Hilgard Hall was constructed six years later by the same architect, and it was named after Eugene W. Hilgard, professor of agricultural chemistry and father of modern soil science. Its neoclassical design is inscribed with the phrase "To Rescue for Human Society the Native Values of Rural Life."

Giannini Hall was designed by Howard's co-worker William Charles Hays through an endowment from the Bancitaly Corporation (now known as Bank of America) in memory of their founder, Amadeo Giannini.

== Departments ==
1. Agricultural and Resource Economics (ARE) researches global food production, nutrition and health, development economics, climate change, environmental economics, applied econometrics, policy evaluation, energy economics, natural resource economics, and international trade. Admissions to ARE's graduate program are highly competitive, with an acceptance rate of 8.8%. ARE offers one undergraduate major, Bachelor of Science (B.S.) in Environmental Economics and Policy (EEP). Starting in the 2025-26 academic year ARE is chaired by Sofia Villas-Boas.
2. Environmental Science, Policy and Management (ESPM) is the largest department within Rausser College, with three interrelated divisions Ecosystems Sciences, Organisms and Environment, and Society and Environment divisions. Research, teaching and outreach themes include biosphere/critical zone, biodiversity/dynamic environments, stewardship and environmental changes, and humanity and future earth. Admissions to ESPM's graduate program are highly competitive, with an acceptance rate of 8.75%. ESPM graduates may earn a Ph.D. in Environmental Science, Policy, and Management, a M.A. in Forestry, or a M.S. in Range Management. ESPM also offers five undergraduate majors: Conservation and Resource Studies (CRS), Environmental Sciences (ES), Forestry and Natural Resources (FNR), Molecular Environmental Biology (MEB), and Society and Environment (SE). ESPM is chaired by George Roderick.
3. Nutritional Sciences & Toxicology (NST) researches the function of nutrients, phytochemicals, toxicants, and the metabolic interaction of these elements in living organisms in order to inform recommendations for dietary patterns to achieve optimum health and the treatment or prevent of chronic disease conditions. NST offers doctoral degrees in Molecular and Biochemical Nutrition, as well as in Molecular Toxicology. The department oversees one undergraduate major program in Nutritional Sciences, with specialized tracks in Physiology & Metabolism, Dietetics, and Molecular Toxicology. NST is chaired by Andreas Stahl.
4. Plant and Microbial Biology encompasses theoretical and applied research in ecology, computational biology, genomics, host-microbe interactions, physiology, and biochemistry. It offers a Ph.D. in Plant or Microbial Biology, and oversees two similarly named undergraduate major programs. PMB is chaired by John Coates.
5. Energy and Resources Group (ERG) provides education and research for a sustainable environment and a just society. ERG is a collaborative community of graduate students, core faculty, over 100 affiliated faculty and researchers across the campus, and nearly 500 alumni across the globe. Degrees include MA, MS, and PhD. Beginning in the 2017-18 academic year, ERG is chaired by Daniel Kammen.
