= Gordon Rausser =

American economist

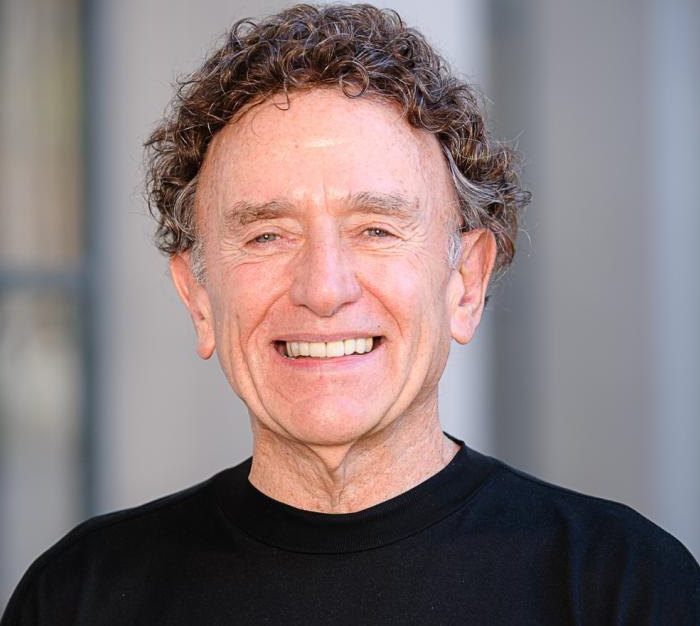
- Education: University of California, Davis (MS & PhD) California State University, Fresno
- Title: Robert Gordon Sproul Distinguished Professor Emeritus Dean Emeritus, RCNR Professor of the Graduate School, UC Berkeley

Gordon Rausser is an American economist. He is currently the Robert Gordon Sproul Distinguished Professor Emeritus, Dean Emeritus, at Rausser College of Natural Resources and more recently, a professor of the graduate school at the University of California, Berkeley. On three occasions, he served as chairman of the Department of Agriculture and Resource Economics, served two terms as Dean of the Rausser College of Natural Resources, and has served on the board of trustees of public universities and one private university. Rausser has been appointed to more than 20 board of directors of both private and publicly traded companies, including chairman of several of such boards.

His federal government service includes Senior Economist at the Council of Economic Advisers, Executive Office of the President, Chief Economist at the Agency for International Development and as President of the Institute for Policy Reform.

Rausser's editorship contributions include serving as editor of the American Journal of Agricultural Economics, associate editor of the Journal of the American Statistical Association, associate editor of the Journal of Economic Dynamics and Control, editor of the series Agricultural Management and Economics, co-editor of four volumes of the Handbook of Agricultural Economics, and more than 15 years as the editor of Annual Review of Resource Economics.

He is the recipient of at least 37 professional awards, including Best Journal Articles, Annual Best Published Research awards, and Publications of Enduring Quality from the Agricultural and Applied Economics Association, and outstanding research and/or leadership awards from other associations, such as Harvard University, University of California, Berkeley, the American Antitrust Institute, and the Western Agricultural Economics Association. Rausser also received a Superior Unit Citation Award from the Agency for International Development (1990). Rausser is chairman and co-founder of OnPoint Analytics.

He was most recently honored by AAEA for named keynote addressed at the annual meetings from 2020 forward for exceptional intellectual leadership and his mentoring of leading scholars. He was also honored in 2020 by the permanent naming of the Rausser College of Natural Resources, UC Berkeley, for his philanthropic contributions. In 2025, he was awarded winner of the Galbraith Award by AAEA, commemorating outstanding agricultural economists who have made significant contributions to humanity through their leadership, research and achievements. Also in 2025, he received Emeriti of the Year Award from the UC Berkeley Emeriti Association for his continued scholarly work and commitment to the success of UC Berkeley.

== Selected publications ==
- Rausser, Gordon; Swinnen, Johan; Zusman, Pinhas (2011), Political Power and Economic Policy, vol. 1, Cambridge University Press

== Awards and honors ==
In 2025, Rausser was awarded "Emeriti of the Year" from the UC Berkeley Emeriti Association.

In 2025, Rausser was awarded the "Galbraith Award" from the AAEA.

In 2020, UC Berkeley's College of Natural Resources was renamed to the Rausser College of Natural Resources.

In 2019, a Festschrift was held in honor of Rausser. This four-day symposia composed of some of the world's leading economists on those most pressing topics facing society highlighted Rausser's pioneering research and policy.

In 2018, Rausser was awarded the "Best Article Award" from the American Journal of Agricultural Economics for his article, "Commodity Storage and the Market Effects of Biofuel Policies".

In 2017, Rausser was awarded the "Quality of Communication Award Honorable Mention" from the Agricultural and Applied Economic Association for his book, "Structuring Public-Private Research Partnerships for Success: Empowering University Partnerships".

In 2014, Rausser was awarded the "Best Private Enforcement Academic Article" from the American Antitrust Institute.

In 2014, Rausser was awarded the "European Quality of Policy Contribution Award" from the European Association of Agricultural Economists.

In 2012, Rausser was selected as a member for the International Scientific Council, LICOS Centre for Institutions and Economic Performance at the University of Leuven, Belgium.

In 2012, Rausser was awarded the "National Excellence in Multistate Research Award" from the Southern Association of Agricultural Experiment Station Directors.

In 2012, Rausser was awarded the "Distinguished Scholar Award" from the Western Agricultural Economics Association.

In 2003, Rausser was selected to present the AAEA Galbraith Forum.

In 2001, Rausser was awarded the "Quality of Research Discovery Award" from the AAEA.

In 2000, Rausser was awarded the "Secretary of Agricultural Award" and the "Cooperative State Research, Education, and Extension Service Awards" from the U.S. Department of Agriculture for "outstanding accomplishments in agricultural public policy research and formulation".

In 1993, Rausser was selected as a fellow at the American Association for the Advancement of Science.

In 1993, Rausser was awarded the "Publication of Enduring Quality Award" from the Agricultural and Applied Economics Association.

In 1993, Rausser was awarded the "Distinguished Policy Contribution Award" from the Agricultural and Applied Economics Association.

In 1991, Rausser was selected as an American Statistical Association Fellow.

In 1990, Rausser was awarded the "Superior Unit Citation Award" from the U.S. Agency for International Development for his leadership.

In 1990, Rausser selected as an AAEA Fellow.

In 1990, Rausser received a special recognition for "outstanding professional research contributions" from the Agricultural Economics and Agribusiness, 3rd. edition book.

In 1986, Rausser was awarded the "Best Published Research Award" from the Agricultural and Applied Economics.

In 1982, Rausser was awarded the "Best Journal Article Award" from the AAEA for his article, "Commodity Price Forecasting with Large-Scale Econometric Models and the Futures Markets".

In 1976, Rausser was awarded the "Best Published Research Award" from the AAEA.
