= Pontifical Academy of Sciences =

Scientific academy of the Vatican City

- Pontificia accademia delle scienze
- Type: Catholic, Research institute, Pontifical University
- Established: 1936; 90 years ago
- Chancellor: Peter Cardinal Turkson
- President: Joachim von Braun
- Location: Casina Pio IV; 00120 Vatican City; 41°54′15″N 12°27′9″E
- Website: pas.va

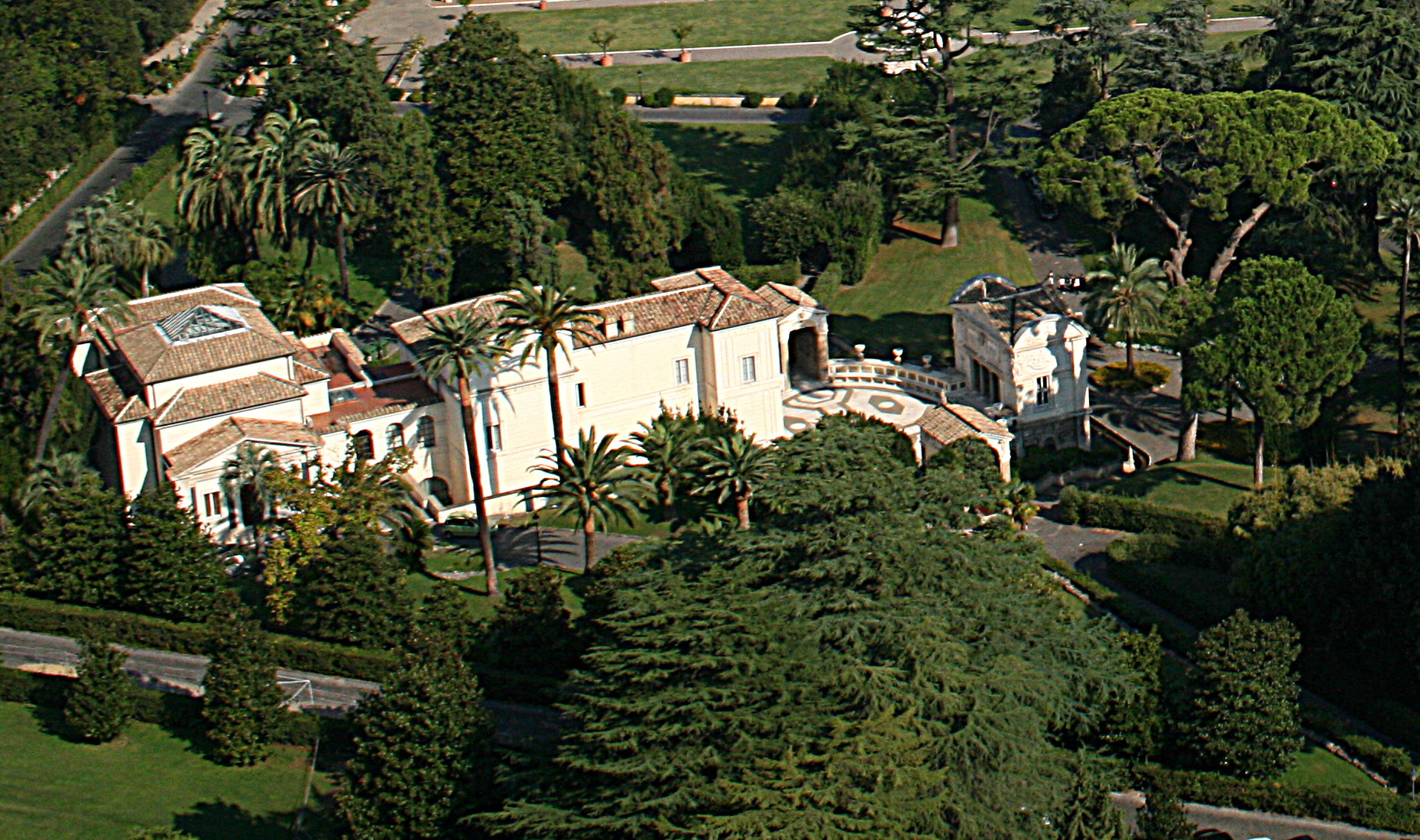
Casina Pio IV, home of the academy

The Pontifical Academy of Sciences (Italian: Pontificia accademia delle scienze, Latin: Pontificia Academia Scientiarum) is a scientific academy of the Vatican City, established in 1936 by Pope Pius XI. Its aim is to promote the progress of the mathematical, physical, and natural sciences and the study of related epistemological problems. The Accademia Pontificia dei Nuovi Lincei ("Pontifical Academy of the New Lynxes") was founded in 1847 as a more closely supervised successor to the Accademia dei Lincei ("Academy of Lynxes") established in Rome in 1603 by the learned Roman Prince, Federico Cesi (1585–1630), who was a young botanist and naturalist, and which claimed Galileo Galilei as its president. The Accademia nazionale dei Lincei survives as a wholly separate institution because (after the capture of Rome in 1870) the academy was de facto divided in 1874 between a Pontifical academy, rebranded in 1936, and a National academy ("Accademia Nazionale Reale dei Lincei" created by Quintino Sella) of the Kingdom of Italy.

The Academy of Sciences, one of the Pontifical academies at the Vatican in Rome, is headquartered in the Casina Pio IV in the heart of the Vatican Gardens.

== History ==
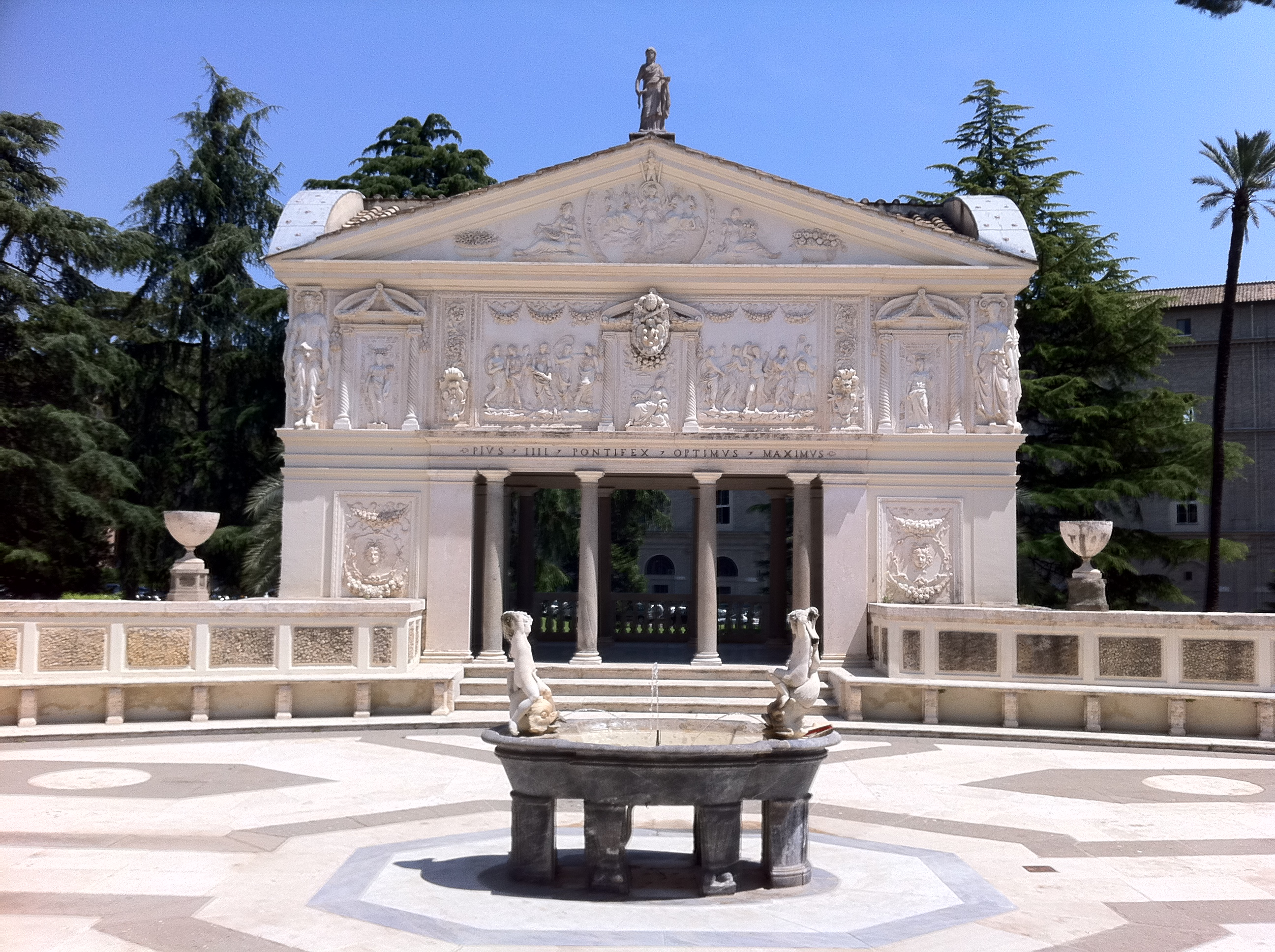
Academy courtyard

Cesi wanted his academicians to adhere to a research methodology based upon observation, experimentation, and the inductive method. He thus called his academy "dei lincei" because its members had "eyes as sharp as lynxes," scrutinizing nature at both microscopic and macroscopic levels. The leader of the first academy was the scientist Galileo Galilei.

Academy of Lynxes was dissolved after the death of its founder, but was re-created by Pope Pius IX in 1847 and given the name Accademia Pontificia dei Nuovi Lincei ("Pontifical Academy of the New Lynxes"). It was later re-founded in 1936 by Pope Pius XI and given its current name. Pope Paul VI in 1976 and Pope John Paul II in 1986 subsequently updated its statutes.

Since 1936, the Pontifical Academy of Sciences has been concerned both with investigating specific scientific subjects belonging to individual disciplines and with the promotion of interdisciplinary co-operation. It has progressively increased the number of its academicians and the international character of its membership. The Academy is an independent body within the Holy See and enjoys freedom of research. The statutes of 1976 express its goal: "The Pontifical Academy of Sciences has as its goal the promotion of the progress of the mathematical, physical, and natural sciences, and the study of related epistemological questions and issues."

== Activities ==
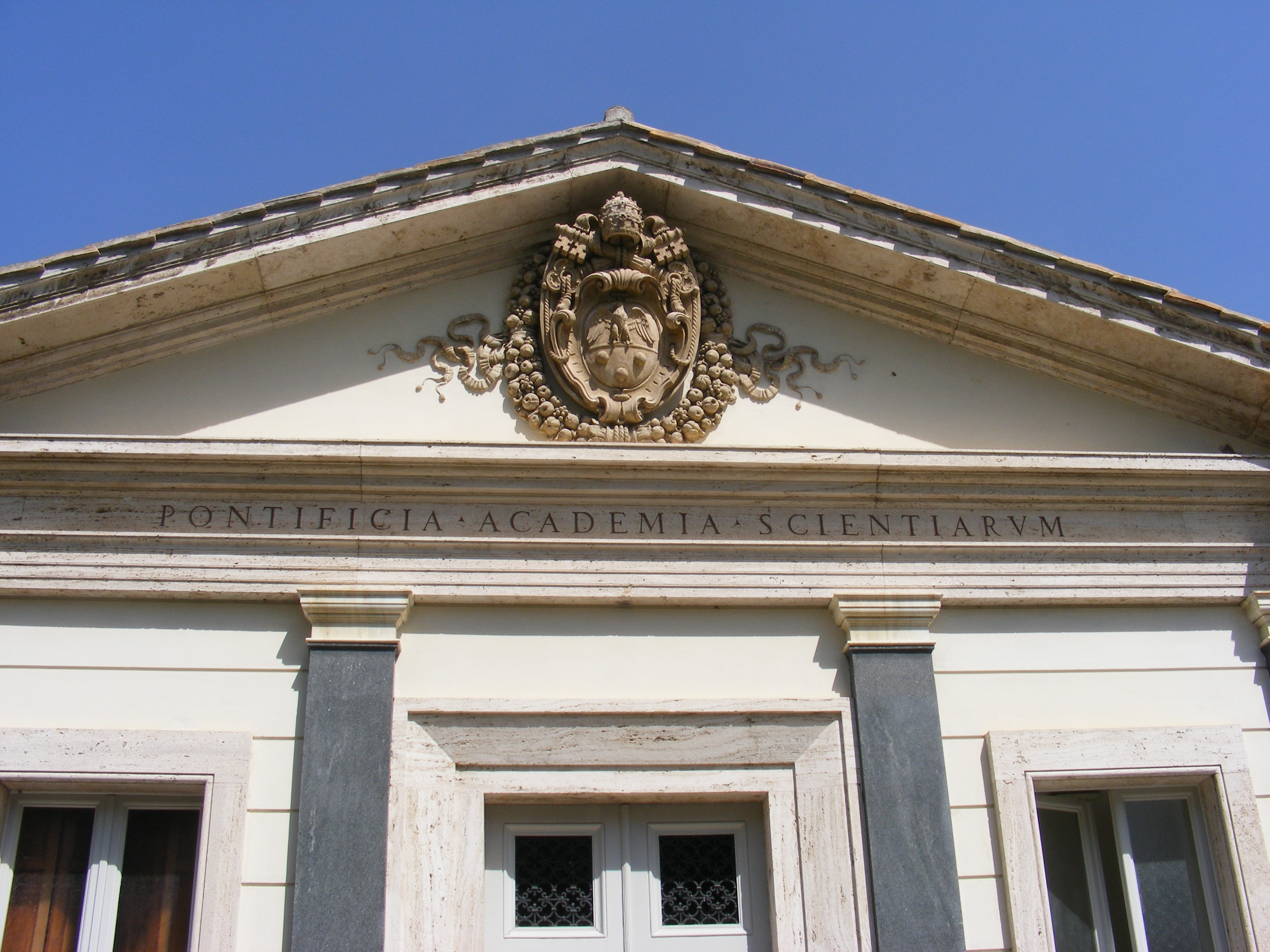
Academy entrance

Since the Academy and its membership is not influenced by factors of a national, political, or religious character it represents a valuable source of objective scientific information which is made available to the Holy See and to the international scientific community. Today the work of the Academy covers six main areas:

- fundamental science
- the science and technology of global questions and issues
- science in favor of the problems of the Third World
- the ethics and politics of science
- bioethics
- epistemology

The disciplines involved are sub-divided into eight fields: the disciplines of physics and related disciplines; astronomy; chemistry; the earth and environmental sciences; the life sciences (botany, agronomy, zoology, genetics, molecular biology, biochemistry, the neurosciences, surgery); mathematics; the applied sciences; and the philosophy and history of sciences.

Principal among the many publications produced by the Academy are:

- Acta – proceedings of the Plenary Sessions
- Scripta Varia – major works such as full reports on Study Weeks & Working Groups held at the Academy; some, due to their special importance, have been taken up by foreign publishers
- Documenta & Extra Series – for quick publication of summaries and conclusions of Study Weeks and Working Groups; also for rapid diffusion of Papal addresses to the Academy, and of significant documents such as the "Declaration on the Prevention of Nuclear War"
- Commentarii – notes and memoirs as well as special studies on scientific subjects.

With the goal of promoting scientific research, the Pius XI Medal is awarded by the Academy every two years to a young scientist who is under the age of 45 and shows exceptional promise. A few of the winners have also become members of the Academy.

== Goals and hopes of the Academy ==
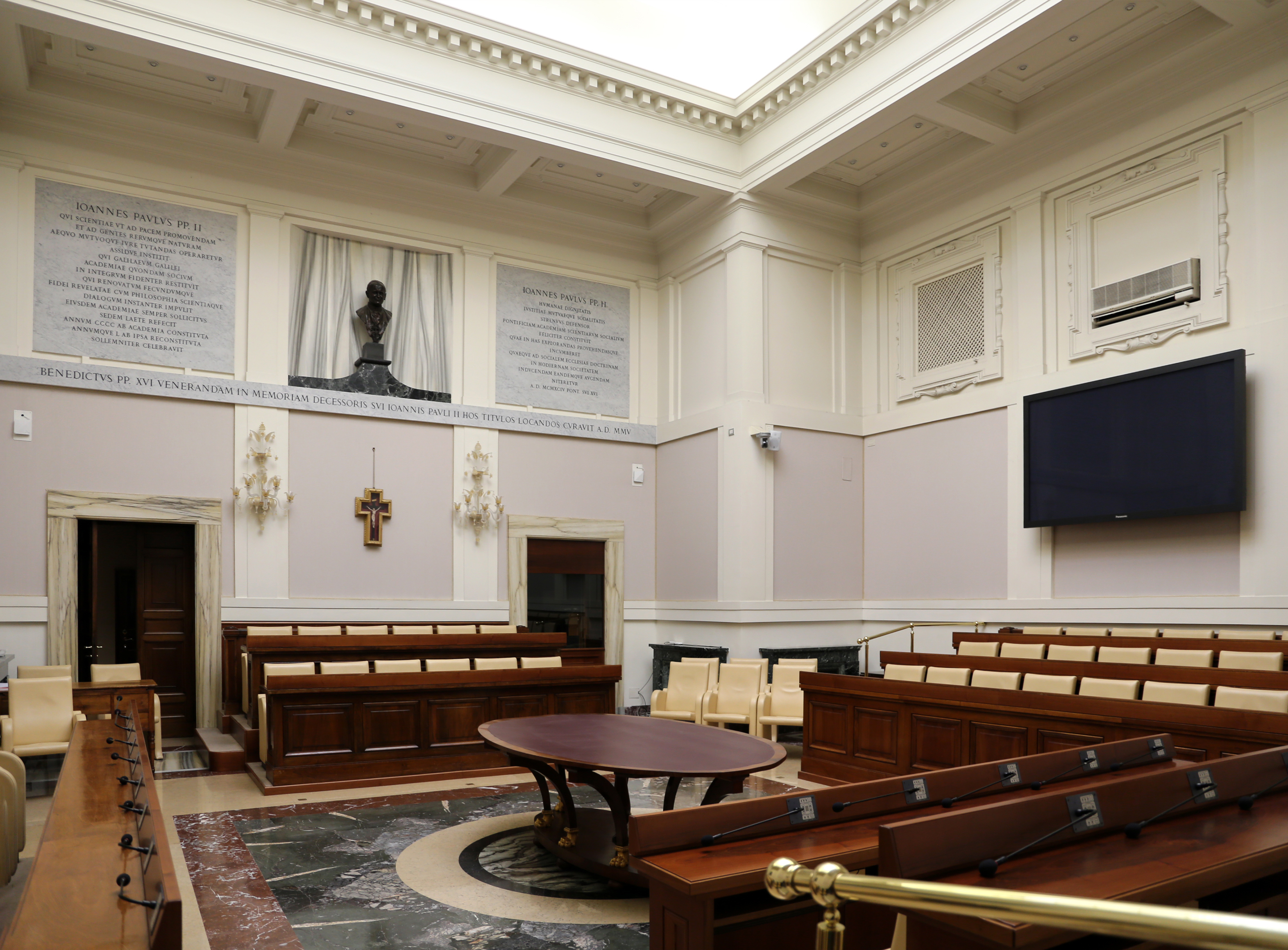
Aula Magna

The goals and hopes of the Academy were expressed by Pope Pius XI in the motu proprio "In multis solaciis" which brought about its re-foundation in 1936:

"Amongst the many consolations with which divine Goodness has wished to make happy the years of our Pontificate, I am happy to place that of our having being able to see not a few of those who dedicate themselves to the studies of the sciences mature their attitude and their intellectual approach towards religion. Science, when it is real cognition, is never in contrast with the truth of the Christian faith. Indeed, as is well known to those who study the history of science, it must be recognized on the one hand that the Roman Pontiffs and the Catholic Church have always fostered the research of the learned in the experimental field as well, and on the other hand that such research has opened up the way to the defense of the deposit of supernatural truths entrusted to the Church.... We promise again that it is our strongly-held intention, that the 'Pontifical Academicians', through their work and our Institution, work ever more and ever more effectively for the progress of the sciences. Of them we do not ask anything else, since this praiseworthy intent and this noble work in the service of the truth is what we expect of them."

Forty years later (10 November 1979), John Paul II once again emphasized the role and goals of the Academy, on the 100th anniversary (centenary) of the birth of Albert Einstein:

"The existence of this Pontifical Academy of Sciences, of which in its ancient ancestry Galileo was a member and of which today eminent scientists are members, without any form of ethnic or religious discrimination, is a visible sign, raised amongst the peoples of the world, of the profound harmony that can exist between the truths of science and the truths of faith.... The Church of Rome together with all the Churches spread throughout the world attributes a great importance to the function of the Pontifical Academy of Sciences. The title of 'Pontifical' given to the Academy means, as you know, the interest and the commitment of the Church, in different forms from the ancient patronage, but no less profound and effective in character.... How could the Church have lacked interest in the most noble of the occupations which are most strictly human – the search for truth?"

"Both believing scientists and non-believing scientists are involved in deciphering the palimpsest of nature which has been built in a rather complex way, where the traces of the different stages of the long evolution of the world have been covered over and mixed up. The believer, perhaps, has the advantage of knowing that the puzzle has a solution, that the underlying writing is in the final analysis the work of an intelligent being, and that thus the problem posed by nature has been posed to be solved and that its difficulty is without doubt proportionate to the present or future capacity of humanity. This, perhaps, will not give him new resources for the investigation engaged in. But it will contribute to maintaining him in that healthy optimism without which a sustained effort cannot be engaged in for long."

On 8 November 2012 Pope Benedict XVI told members of the Pontifical Academy of Sciences:

"Dialogue and cooperation between faith and science are urgently needed for building a culture that respects people and the planet.... Without faith and science informing each other, the great questions of humanity leave the domain of reason and truth, and are abandoned to the irrational, to myth, or to indifference, with great damage to humanity itself, to world peace and to our ultimate destiny.... (As people strive to) unlock the mysteries of man and the universe, I am convinced of the urgent need for continued dialogue and cooperation between the worlds of science and of faith in building a culture of respect for man, for human dignity and freedom, for the future of our human family, and for the long-term sustainable development of our planet."

== Members ==
The new members of the Academy are elected by the body of Academicians and chosen from men and women of every race and religion based on the high scientific value of their activities and their high moral profile. They are then officially appointed by the Roman Pontiff. The Academy is governed by a President, appointed from its members by the Pope, who is helped by a scientific Council and by the Chancellor. Initially made up of 80 Academicians, 70 who were appointed for life. In 1986 John Paul II raised the number of members for life to 80, side by side with a limited number of Honorary Academicians chosen because they are highly qualified figures, and others who are Academicians because of the posts they hold, including the Chancellor of the Academy, the Director of the Vatican Observatory, the Prefect of the Vatican Apostolic Library, and the Prefect of the Vatican Apostolic Archive.

=== President ===
The president of the Academy is appointed from its members by the Pope. The current president is Joachim von Braun, as of 21 June 2017, who assumed the position after Werner Arber, who is a Nobel Prize Laureate and was the first Protestant to hold the position.

The list of all current and past presidents of the Academy is below:

Presidents of the Pontifical Academy of Sciences
| Name | Start of Presidential Term | End of Presidential Term |
|---|---|---|
| Agostino Gemelli O.F.M. | 28 October 1936 | 15 July 1959 |
| Georges Lemaître | 19 March 1960 | 20 June 1966 |
| Daniel Joseph Kelly O'Connell | 15 January 1968 | 15 January 1972 |
| Carlos Chagas Filho | 9 November 1972 | 30 October 1988 |
| Giovanni Battista Marini Bettolo Marconi | 31 October 1988 | 29 March 1993 |
| Nicola Cabibbo | 30 March 1993 | 16 August 2010 |
| Werner Arber | 20 December 2010 | 20 June 2017 |
| Joachim von Braun | 21 June 2017 | - |

== See also ==
- Catholic Church & science
- Science and the Popes
