= Matin Qaim =

German food systems and development economist (born 1969)

- Born: December 20, 1969 (age 56); Mainz, Germany
- Education: University of Bonn University of Kiel
- Scientific career
- Workplaces: University of Bonn, University of Goettingen, University of Hohenheim
- Doctoral advisor: Joachim von Braun

Matin Qaim (born 20 December 1969, Mainz, Germany) is Schlegel Professor of Agricultural Economics and Director at the Center for Development Research (ZEF) of the University of Bonn, Germany. His research focuses on issues of food security, food system transformation, and sustainable development.

Qaim was elected as a Member of the German National Academy of Sciences Leopoldina in 2018 and as a Fellow of the Agricultural & Applied Economics Association (AAEA) in 2019. In 2024, he became President of the International Association of Agricultural Economists (IAAE).

== Early life and education ==
Matin Qaim earned his MSc from the University of Kiel in 1996 and his doctoral degree in agricultural economics from the University of Bonn in 2000. His doctoral supervisor was Joachim von Braun. Qaim did postdoctoral work at the University of California at Berkeley from 2001-2003. In 2003, he received his habilitation from the University of Bonn with his venia legendi in agricultural and development economics.

== Career ==
Qaim served as Professor of International Agricultural Trade and Food Security at the University of Hohenheim from 2004-2007. He was Professor of International Food Economics and Rural Development at the University of Goettingen from 2007-2021. He joined the Center for Development Research (ZEF) at the University of Bonn, Germany, as Director in 2021.

== Research ==
Qaim specializes in food security, food system transformation, and sustainable development. He is known for his meticulous analysis of the economics of agricultural biotechnology, connections of farmers to global value chains, and linkages between agriculture and nutrition.

Qaim argues that higher-yield genetically modified crops can be used to reduce land usage and greenhouse gas emissions from agriculture. He also supports the use of modified crops such as Golden Rice, which has a higher beta-carotene level than conventional rice, as a source of Vitamin A to address micronutrient malnutrition. Qaim is a member of the Golden Rice Humanitarian Board.

Qaim recommends a balanced approach to sustainable consumption of meat and other animal-sourced foods. Pointing out that existing meat prices do not reflect their high environmental cost, Qaim calls for significant reductions in meat consumption in wealthy countries, where per capita consumption levels are high. In poorer countries, where per capita consumption levels are much lower, improving access to animal-sourced foods can help improve healthy nutrition, especially among children. Qaim also analyzes possible synergies and tradeoffs between the health and environmental dimensions of dietary change.

In a related strain of research, Qaim analyzes links between the diversity of food systems and various planetary health outcomes. For instance, unlike often assumed, he argues that increasing the diversity of smallholder farms in Africa does not necessarily improve diets and nutrition. While farm diversity is linked to nutrition in remote subsistence settings, improving smallholder access to markets and enhancing the functioning of markets for nutritious foods are generally more effective strategies to increase dietary quality and promote socioeconomic development. Qaim is Director and Spokesperson of the Collaborative Research Center (CRC 1780) "Food System Diversification for Sustainable Nutrition (FoodDiverse)" at the University of Bonn, which is funded by the German Research Foundation (DFG) and implemented jointly with the University of Ghana.

== Awards and honors (selection) ==
- 2025, Tilo Freiherr von Wilmowsky Award
- 2019, Fellow, Agricultural & Applied Economics Association (AAEA)
- 2018, Member, German National Academy of Sciences Leopoldina
- 2011, Member, Göttingen Academy of Sciences

== Selected publications ==
=== Books ===
- Qaim, Matin (2000). Potential impacts of crop biotechnology in developing countries. Frankfurt am Main: Peter Lang. ISBN 0-8204-4830-3.
- Qaim, Matin; Krattiger, Anatole F.; von Braun, Joachim, eds. (2000). Agricultural biotechnology in developing countries: towards optimizing the benefits for the poor. Boston: Kluwer Academic Publishers. ISBN 0-7923-7230-1.
- Qaim, Matin (2016). Genetically modified crops and agricultural development. Palgrave Studies in Agricultural Economics and Food Policy (AEFP). doi:10.1057/9781137405722. ISBN 978-1-349-95844-3.

=== Papers ===
- Qaim, Matin; Zilberman, David (7 February 2003). "Yield Effects of Genetically Modified Crops in Developing Countries". Science. 299 (5608): 900–902. Bibcode:2003Sci...299..900Q. doi:10.1126/science.1080609. ISSN 0036-8075. PMID 12574633. S2CID 10732036.
- Hülsen, V., M.G. Khonje, M. Qaim (2024). "Market Food Environments and Child Nutrition". Food Policy 128, 102704, https://doi.org/10.1016/j.foodpol.2024.102704.
- Qaim, Matin (October 2009). "The Economics of Genetically Modified Crops". Annual Review of Resource Economics. 1 (1): 665–694. doi:10.1146/annurev.resource.050708.144203. ISSN 1941-1340.
- Sibhatu, Kibrom T.; Krishna, Vijesh V.; Qaim, Matin (25 August 2015). "Production diversity and dietary diversity in smallholder farm households". Proceedings of the National Academy of Sciences. 112 (34): 10657–10662. Bibcode:2015PNAS..11210657S. doi:10.1073/pnas.1510982112. ISSN 0027-8424. PMC 4553771. PMID 26261342.
- Klümper, Wilhelm; Qaim, Matin (3 November 2014). "A Meta-Analysis of the Impacts of Genetically Modified Crops". PLOS ONE. 9 (11) e111629. Bibcode:2014PLoSO...9k1629K. doi:10.1371/journal.pone.0111629. ISSN 1932-6203. PMC 4218791. PMID 25365303.
- Fischer, Elisabeth; Qaim, Matin (1 June 2012). "Linking Smallholders to Markets: Determinants and Impacts of Farmer Collective Action in Kenya". World Development. 40 (6): 1255–1268. doi:10.1016/j.worlddev.2011.11.018. hdl:10419/90498. ISSN 0305-750X.
- Meemken, Eva-Marie; Qaim, Matin (5 October 2018). "Organic Agriculture, Food Security, and the Environment". Annual Review of Resource Economics. 10 (1): 39–63. doi:10.1146/annurev-resource-100517-023252. ISSN 1941-1340. S2CID 158703015.
- Qaim, Matin; Sibhatu, Kibrom T.; Siregar, Hermanto; Grass, Ingo (6 October 2020). "Environmental, Economic, and Social Consequences of the Oil Palm Boom". Annual Review of Resource Economics. 12 (1): 321–344. doi:10.1146/annurev-resource-110119-024922. ISSN 1941-1340. S2CID 219480602.
- Parlasca, Martin C.; Qaim, Matin (5 October 2022). "Meat Consumption and Sustainability". Annual Review of Resource Economics. 14 (1): 17–41. doi:10.1146/annurev-resource-111820-032340. ISSN 1941-1340.
