= Rosalinda Bueso =

Honduran diplomat

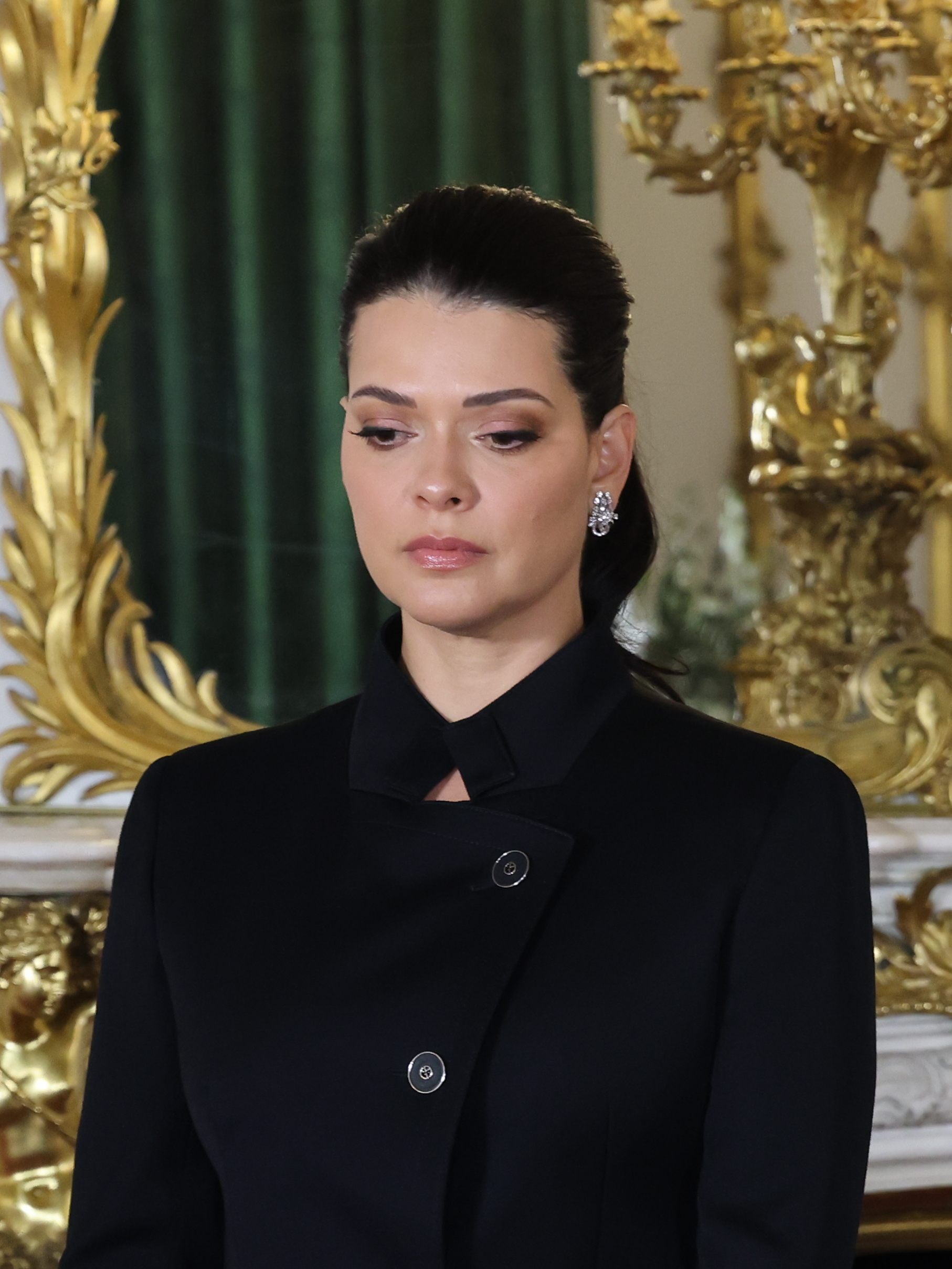
- Bueso in 2022
- Born: Rosalinda Bueso Asfura; 4 June 1977 (age 49); Tegucigalpa, Honduras
- Education: Central American Technological University (BBA)
- Occupation: Ambassador
- Spouse: Marcelo Ebrard (m. 2011)

Rosalinda Bueso Asfura (born 4 June 1977) is a Honduran diplomat who served as the ambassador of the Republic of Honduras to the United Mexican States from 2007 to 2010.

== Biography ==
Rosalinda Bueso Asfura was born on 4 June 1977 in Tegucigalpa. She studied business administration in tourism and marketing and sales at Central American Technological University (UNITEC).

In February 2006, she entered the diplomatic service as Coordinator of Diplomatic Ceremony and Liaison with the Chancellery of Honduras, in the government of José Manuel Zelaya Rosales, a position in which she remained for eight months. In October 2006 she was appointed Traveling Ambassador, Coordinator of Cooperation, Investment, and Free Trade. In April 2007, Bueso was named ambassador of Honduras in Mexico.

She is currently married to Mexican politician Marcelo Ebrard.

== Crisis of 2009 ==
Two years after becoming ambassador, Bueso faced a delicate political crisis in Honduras. On 28 June 2009, Roberto Micheletti initiated a coup against the government of José Manuel Zelaya Rosales, who was expelled from Honduras and taken to San José, capital of Costa Rica. As a member of the Zelaya Rosales government, Bueso could not enter the embassy located in the Colonia Condesa in Mexico City, by order of the Honduran government. Later, on 21 July 2009, the Mexican Secretariat of Foreign Affairs recognized Bueso as the ambassador of Honduras and the rest of the officials as the only Honduran diplomats accredited in Mexico. In turn, the government of the Federal District, headed by Marcelo Ebrard Casaubón, supported the government of José Manuel Zelaya and, therefore, the representative of Honduras in Mexico, sending police to the embassy to allow them access. Bueso would finally enter on 22 July 2009. The support and security offered by Ebrard was essential to Bueso recovering the offices of the diplomatic legation.

Preceded by	Ambassador of Honduras to Mexico 2007–2010	Succeeded by José Mariano Castillo
