= Ed Dieckmann =

Ed Dieckmann is a former guitarist and vocalist with Dutch rockabilly band the Crocats and blues outfit Fake Brothers, currently playing with The Bokito Brothers and Big Jake & The Two-Timers.

He is the writer of two Beatles books about their record releases in Holland: The Beatles Made In Holland (1996, ISBN 90-803935-2-5) and The Beatles Made In Holland Too (1997, ISBN 90-803935-1-7), as well as the International Dark Horse Records And Ring 'O Records Discography (2002, ISBN 90-803935-3-3). An updated and extended version of the latter was published in 2004. Also, together with Franck Leenheer he published George Harrison: Dark Horse And Beyond - Discography 1974-2004 (2004, ISBN 90-803935-4-1). In May 2007, Ed issued #1 of The Beatles Collectors Magazine.

== Discography ==
=== Why Not ===
01) LP 12 For You To Catch (1985, Audio Records AR 22985)
VA LP, features Sweet India (composed by Ed Dieckmann) by Why Not (feat. Ed on guitar)

=== Crocats ===
==== Good Rockin' Tonight LP ====
(1987, Disky DLP 2019)
VA LP, features If You Don't Know How To Dance (Matt Vermeulen-Ruben Spelbos-Harjen van den Brink), Dance To The Boogie (Matt Vermeulen-Ruben Spelbos-Harjen van de Brink) + Good Rockin' Tonight (Roy Brown)
02) Single Good Rockin' Tonight (1987, Disky DISK 1063)
03) LP Honey Doll (1989, Tombstone Tomb-Disc 674)
Rock Billy Boogie (Johnny & Dorsey Burnette), Honey Doll (Ed Dieckmann), Ducktails (Ed Dieckmann), Rockabilly Dog (Herman Schoenmakers), Montana Millie (Ruben Spelbos), Whistling Jones (Ed Dieckmann-Ruben Spelbos), Don't You Rock Me Daddy-O (Varley-Whitton), Lonesome Coyote (Ed Dieckmann), Motor Man (Ed Dieckmann), Boomerang (Ed Dieckmann), Honey Don't (Carl Perkins), Truckin' (Ed Dieckmann), Some Of Your Loving Won't Do (Ed Dieckmann), My Home Town (Ruben Spelbos), Killer Walk (Ed Dieckmann)
04) LP Merlin 230363-030989 (1989, Merlin Records MR1)
VA LP, features Popcorn (Ed Dieckmann)
05) LP Holland Billy - 16 Of The Best Dutch Rockin' Bands (1990, Rockhouse LPD 9005)
VA LP, Features Bop Tonight + Red Hot Nellie
06) CD Holland Billy - 16 Of The Best Dutch Rockin' Bands (1990, Rockhouse RockCD 9005)
VA CD, Features Bop Tonight + Red Hot Nellie
07) LP Holland Billy Festival Sampler (1990, Rockhouse LPB 9104)
VA LP, Features Bop Tonight (Ed Dieckmann)
08) Single Always In Love (Ed Dieckmann-Ruben Spelbos) (1990, SSR 8249019)
09) CD Holland Billy Vol. 2 (1991, Rockhouse RockCD 9010)
VA CD, Features Pity Pretty Mamma (Ed Dieckmann-Ruben Spelbos) + Rock And Roll (Ed Dieckmann)
10) LP Neo Rockabilly Story Vol. 12 (1992, Rockhouse LPM 9206)
VA LP, Features Southbound Train (Ed Dieckmann) + Joey B (Ed Dieckmann-Ruben Spelbos)
11) CD Bongo Spinazie (1992, Rockhouse RockCD 9210)
Hitched (Ed Dieckmann-Ruben Spelbos), Pity Pretty Mama (Ed Dieckmann-Ruben Spelbos), I've Just Seen a Face (John Lennon-Paul McCartney), Bop Tonight (Ed Dieckmann), Good Life In The City (Ed Dieckmann), Always In Love (Ed Dieckmann-Ruben Spelbos), Washingline Woe (Ed Dieckmann), You Hideous Orang-Utan (Ed Dieckmann), Joey B (Ed Dieckmann-Ruben Spelbos), Southbound Train (Ed Dieckmann), Murder In The First Degree (Ed Dieckmann), Rock And Roll (Ed Dieckmann), Sugar For Tonight (Ed Dieckmann), Red Hot Nellie (Ruben Spelbos)
12) CD Bongo Spinazie (1993, Jimco JICK-89261)
released in Japan as part of the New Rockabilly Generation series
13) CD Neo Rockabilly Story Part Six (1993, Rockhouse RockCD 9311)
VA CD, Features Southbound Train + Joey B
14) CD The Best Katz Of Rockabilly (1993, Rockhouse RockCD 9321)
VA CD, Features Murder In The First Degree (Ed Dieckmann) + Good Life In The City (Ed Dieckmann)
15) CD Wilhelmina Park Live 26 Juni '93 (1993, WPL-CD 93)
VA CD, Features live versions of My Home Town + Always In Love
16) CD The Crocats: An Apology 1987-1994 (1994, Bootleg release)
If You Don't Know How To Dance (Matt Vermeulen-Ruben Spelbos-Harjen van den Brink), Dance To The Boogie (Matt Vermeulen-Ruben Spelbos-Harjen van den Brink), Good Rockin' Tonight (Roy Brown) (from the Good Rockin' Tonight LP), Rock Billy Boogie (Johnny & Dorsey Burnette), Honey Doll (Ed Dieckmann), Ducktails (Ed Dieckmann), Rockabilly Dog (Herman Schoenmakers), Montana Millie (Ruben Spelbos), Whistling Jones (Ed Dieckmann-Ruben Spelbos), Don't You Rock Me Daddy-O (Varley-Whitton), Lonesome Coyote (Ed Dieckmann), Motor Man (Ed Dieckmann), Boomerang (Ed Dieckmann), Honey Don't (Carl Perkins), Truckin' (Ed Dieckmann), Some Of Your Loving Won't Do (Ed Dieckmann), My Home Town (Ruben Spelbos), Killer Walk (Ed Dieckmann) (from the Honey Doll LP), Popcorn (from the Merlin LP), Always In Love (Ed Dieckmann-Ruben Spelbos) (single version), Jailhouse Rock (Jerry Leiber-Mike Stoller) (NOS TV, 1990), Hitched (Ed Dieckmann) (VPRO Radio, 1993), My Home Town (Ruben Spelbos), Always In Love (Ed Dieckmann-Ruben Spelbos) (from Wilhelmina Park CD), My Girl Is Red Hot (Robert Johnson) (KRO TV, 1994)
17) CD Rebels Without Applause (1997, Rockhouse RockCD 9707)
Take It Down (Dieckmann), Matt The Cruiser (Ruben Spelbos), Graveyard Train (Ed Dieckmann), 35 Miles (Ed Dieckmann), Across The Gobi By Frog (Ed Dieckmann), Feline Walk (Ed Dieckmann), Fine, Fine, Fine (Ed Dieckmann), Baby Driver (Paul Simon), I Wanna Burn All The Banjos In The Civilized World (Ed Dieckmann), Take Me (Where The Wayward Wind Blows) (Ed Dieckmann), Rock City (Ed Dieckmann), "It's All Over Now" (Womack-Womack), I Don't Feel You (Ed Dieckmann), Punks (hidden bonus track) (Herman Schoenmakers)
18) CD Honey Doll (2001, Rarity Records C192665)
Re-issue of the Honey Doll LP with 5 bonus tracks: Always In Love (Single Version), Red Green Go (Ed Dieckmann, Previously Unreleased), Rock City (Ed Dieckmann, Alternate Take), My Home Town (Ruben Spelbos, Live), Always In Love (Ed Dieckmann-Ruben Spelbos, Live)

=== Shakin Silhouets ===
01) LP Holland Billy - 16 Of The Best Dutch Rockin' Bands (1990, Rockhouse LPD 9005)
VA LP, Features Silhouet Rock (Piet Peulen) + Brand New Cadillac (Vince Taylor)
02) CD Holland Billy - 16 Of The Best Dutch Rockin' Bands (1990, Rockhouse RockCD 9005)
VA CD, Features Silhouet Rock (Piet Peulen) + Brand New Cadillac (Vince Taylor)
03) LP Holland Billy Festival Sampler (1990, Rockhouse LPB 9104)
VA LP, Features Tennessee Rockin' (Neale)
04) CD Holland Billy Vol. 2 (1991, Rockhouse RockCD 9010)
VA CD, Features Don't Go My Way (Piet Peulen)
05) CD Neo Rockabilly Story Part Three (1992, Rockhouse RockCD 9207)
VA CD, Features Tennessee Rockin' (Neale)
06) CD Silhouet Rock (2000, Rarity Records CD 192633)
Features Brand New Cadillac (Vince Taylor), Tennessee Rockin' (Neale), Silhouet Rock (Piet Peulen) + Little Pig (Mathis/Kilgore)
The Shakin Silhouets at the time were 'in between' guitarists, and Ed helped out on guitar and backing vocals on these tracks.

=== De Drie Tieten! ===
01) CD De Drie Tieten! Slaan De Plank Volledig Mis... (1995, Rockhouse/De Platenboer MIDCD9507)
Features Job McGregor, Pig On The Loose + Did I Tell You That Old Story (all composed Ed Dieckmann)

=== Fake Brothers ===
01) CD For Real
privately released in 2007
The Stumble, The Picture, Lesson Or Two, Hello Sundown, Texas Cadillac, King's Highway, The Chill, I'm Ready, Help Me, Sidetracked
