= World Mayors Council on Climate Change =

- Company type: Strategic Alliance
- Founded: 2005, Kyoto, Japan
- Headquarters: Kaiser-Friedrich-Str. 7, 53113 Bonn, Germany
- Website: www.worldmayorscouncil.org

The World Mayors Council on Climate Change (WMCCC) is an alliance of mayors who have made a commitment to the protection of climate change. Since 2012, the Chair is Park Won-soon, Mayor of Seoul, South Korea. The Vice-Chair is Juergen Nimptsch, Mayor of Bonn, Germany.

== History ==
The WMCCC was created in 2005 by Yorikane Masumoto, mayor of Kyoto (Japan). The First Chair was Yorikane Masumoto. Baerbel Dieckmann, mayor of Bonn (Germany) was Chair until 2009.

== Advocacy ==
The aim of the WMCCC is "an enhanced recognition and involvement of Mayors in multilateral efforts addressing climate change and related issues of global sustainability". Since its creation it participates to the international negotiations on climate change (UNFCCC) as an observer organization. Its Chair or members often addresses the plenary of the Conference of Parties such as Baerbel Dieckman in 2007.

=== Leadership ===
The World Mayors Council on Climate Change is recognized as one of the major body of mayors leading the way toward low-carbon development.

== Link with ICLEI - Local Governments for Sustainability ==
Since its creation, the World Mayors Council on Climate Change is supported by ICLEI which is acting as its Secretariat and facilitating the participation of its members to the UN climate negotiations.

== Members ==
There are around 50 members to the WMCCC.
