= Joachim von Braun =

German agronomist (born 1950)

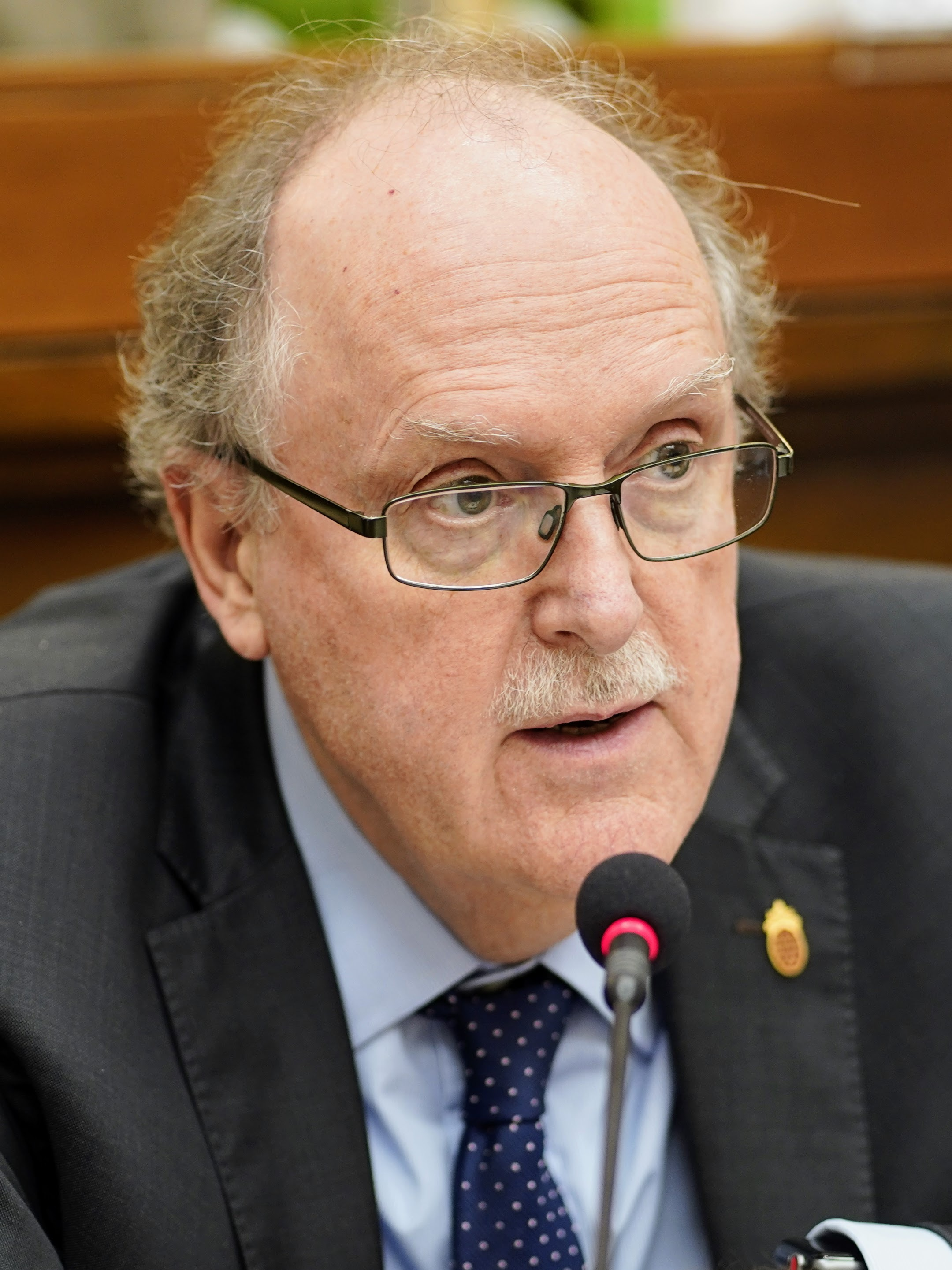
Joachim von Braun in 2019

Joachim von Braun (born July 10, 1950) is a German agricultural scientist and currently director of a department of the Center for Development Research at the University of Bonn and President of the Pontifical Academy of Sciences.

Previously, von Braun was director general of the International Food Policy Research Institute in Washington. In the course of his research, he focuses primarily on agricultural policy, bioeconomics, food security, and sustainable resource use.

== Life ==
Joachim von Braun was born on July 10, 1950 Brakel, Westphalia, and studied agricultural sciences at the Rheinische Friedrich-Wilhelms University in Bonn from 1970 to 1975. He received his doctorate in 1978 with a thesis on agricultural labor markets and habilitated afterwards in agricultural economics on food security in developing countries, both at the Georg August University of Göttingen.

From 1983 to 1993, von Braun was a Research Fellow and then Director of the Food Consumption and Nutrition Division at the International Food Policy Research Institute (IFPRI) in Washington DC. In 1993, he came back to Germany to take up the position of Professor (C4) of Food Economics, Food Policy and World Food Issues and Director of the Institute for Food Economics and Consumer Analyses at the Christian-Albrechts-University of Kiel.

After several research stays in Africa, Russia, and China, von Braun was appointed founding director of the Center for Development Research (ZEF) at the University of Bonn in 1997. In 2002, Braun returned to Washington became director of IFPRI. In 2009, he returned to the Center for Development Research (ZEF) at the Rheinische Friedrich-Wilhelms-Universität Bonn as director and took over the professorship for economic and technological change. Since July 2019, von Braun has also served as co-spokesperson and co-coordinator of the Transdisciplinary Research Area "Innovation and Technology for a Sustainable Future" in the Excellence Initiative of the University of Bonn.

In addition to numerous reports on the world food situation in recent years, von Braun's works include studies on food security, the economics of famine, technical progress, agricultural trade policy, rural financial systems and environmental policy. Von Braun was a speaker at the Rio Conference in 1992, the World Food Summits in 1996 and 2002, and the "World Food Forum" of the Consultative Group on International Agricultural Research (CGIAR) in Beijing in early December 2007. In 2020, he was appointed by the United Nations to chair the Scientific Group of the UN Food Systems Summit 2021.

Von Braun has been:

- Vice president of Welthungerhilfe since November 2012,
- Board member of the Global Alliance for Improved Nutrition (GAIN) since 2012 and Vice Chair from 2013 to 2018,
- Board member of the Alliance for a Green Revolution in Africa (AGRA) since 2015,
- Member of the HighTech Forum of the German Government, appointed by the Federal Minister of Education and Science, from 2016 to 2017,
- Member of the Board of Trustees of the Robert Bosch Stiftung since 2017,
- Science Platform for Sustainable Development 2030, Member of leadership group, and chair of sustainable consumption since 2017,
- Co-chair of the Malabo Montpellier Panel on African Food, Nutrition, Agriculture since 2017,
- Member of the International Advisory Board, Leibniz Centre for Marine Tropical Research (ZMT) Bremen since 2019,
- Member of the executive board, Global Crop Diversity Trust (Crop Trust), since 2020,
- Member of the Academic Advisory Committee of the Academy of Global Food Economics and Policy (AGFEP), China Agricultural University since 2020,
- member of the Corps Borussia Bonn since 1971.

== Honours ==
- 1978: Prize of the Federal Labor Office for the dissertation
- 1988: Josef G. Knoll Science Prize of the Eiselen Foundation for outstanding research on improving food security and nutrition
- 1996: Elected member of the German Economics Association’s (Verein für Socialpolitik), Development Economics Branch
- 1999: Member of the North Rhine-Westphalian Academy of Sciences
- 2004: Appointed honorary professor, Nanjing Agricultural University, China
- 2005: Honorary Doctor of Agricultural Sciences, University of Hohenheim, Germany
- 2006: Fellow of the American Association for the Advancement of Science (AAAS) for his contribution to agricultural development and food policy in developing countries
- 2009: Bertebos Prize Stockholm, Award of the Royal Swedish Academy of Agriculture and Forestry
- 2009: Lifetime Fellow of the International Association of Agricultural Economists (IAAE)
- 2010: Research Fellow IZA (Institute for the Study of Labor)
- 2010: Lifetime Fellow of the African Association of Agricultural Economists
- 2011: Justus von Liebig Prize for World Nutrition, Fiat Panis Foundation
- 2012, appointed by Pope Benedict XVI to the Pontifical Academy of Sciences Pope Francis appointed him president of the Academy on June 21, 2017
- 2016 Marsilius Medal of the Marsilius College of the University of Heidelberg
- 2017: Theodor Brinkmann Prize
- 2018: Member of the National Academy of Sciences Leopoldina
- 2019: The "One World Medal in Gold" awarded by the Minister for Economic Cooperation and Development for research and services to end hunger and improve food security

== Other memberships in scientific associations ==
- Member of the International Association of Agricultural Economists (IAAE) and its president from 2000 to 2003.
- Member of the International Advisory Council of the Chinese Academy of Agricultural Sciences (CAAS)
- Member of the German Academy of Science and Engineering since 2011 (Acatech)
- Member of the editorial board, Food Security Journal since 2009
- Member of the Academic Advisory Board, Joint Programming Initiative on Agriculture, Food Security and Climate Change Research, European Union from 2010 to 2013
- Member of the Advisory Group for Global Agricultural Development Initiative, Chicago Council on Global Affairs, USA from 2010 to 2013
- Member of the Bioeconomy Council of the German Government since 2010 and one of the two chairs from 2012 to 2019
- Associate editor, Science Advances since 2014
- Associate Fellow African Academy of Sciences since 2014
