= Bärbel Dieckmann =

German politician

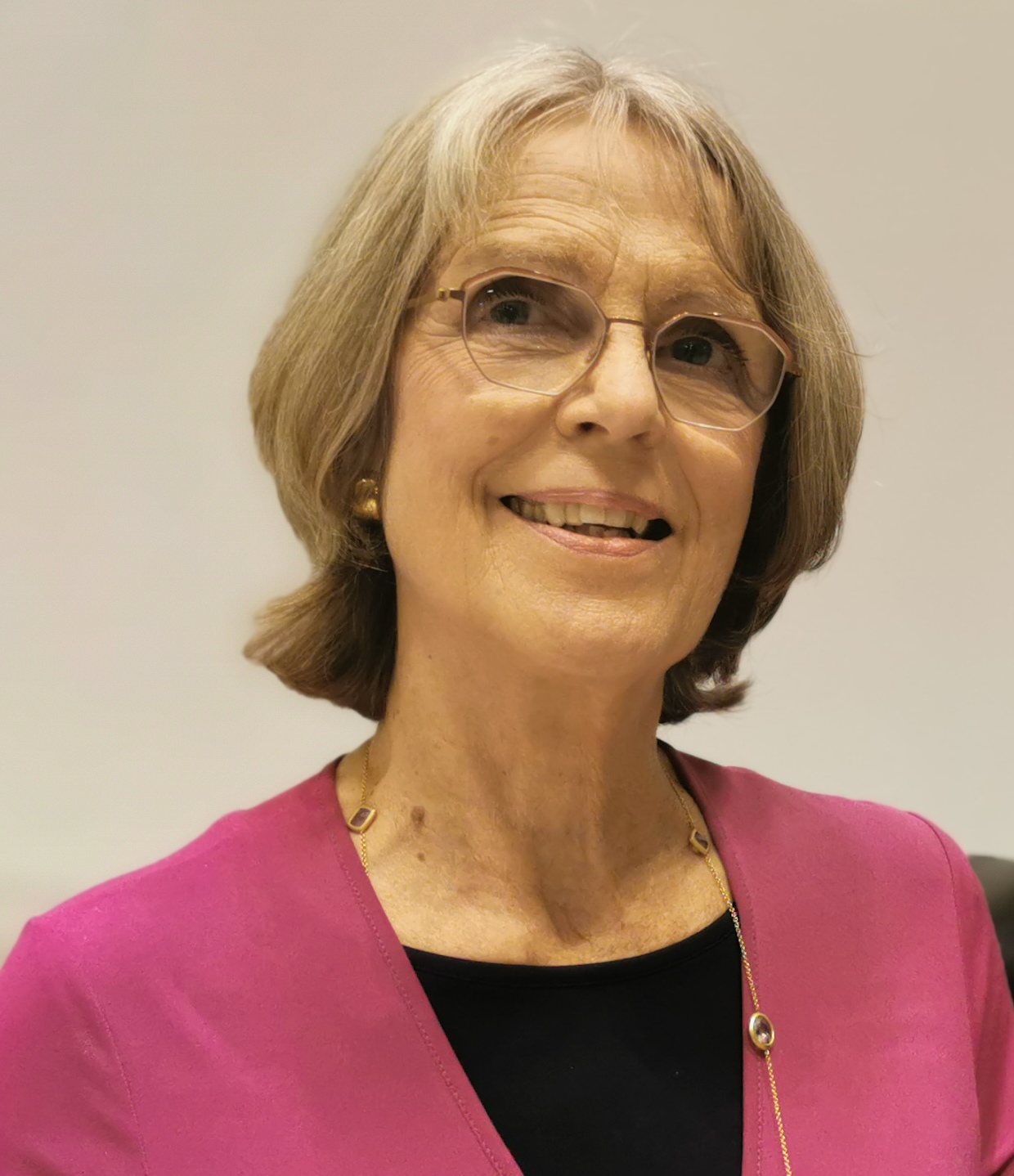
- Dieckmann in 2021
- Born: 26 March 1949 (age 75); Leverkusen, Germany
- Spouse: Joachim Dieckmann
- Children: 4

Bärbel Dieckmann (née Pritz, born 26 March 1949) is a German politician who was elected mayor of Bonn in 1994 and was in office until 2009. She is the first woman and Social Democrat to become mayor of Bonn.

== Early life and education ==
The daughter of a diplomat, Dieckmann was born in Leverkusen in 1949.

Dieckmann graduated from Erzbischöfliche Liebfrauenschule Bonn in 1967. From 1967 until 1972, she studied philosophy, history and social sciences at the University of Bonn for a teaching degree. She was a teacher for twenty years.

== Political career ==
In 1972 Dieckmann joined the Social Democratic Party of Germany (SPD).

From 1994 until 2009, Dieckmann served as mayor of Bonn. During her time in office, United Nations Volunteers (UNV) moved its headquarters to Bonn in 1999. Internationally, Dieckmann served as executive president of the Council of European Municipalities and Regions (CEMR) between 1999 and 2003. From 2005 she chaired the World Mayors Council on Climate Change (WMCCC); the office was established after the Kyoto Protocol came into force.

In 2005, Dieckmann became vice federal chairwoman of the SPD under chairman Matthias Platzeck, but left office two years later.

== Life after politics ==
From 2008 until 2018, Dieckmann served as president of Welthungerhilfe. In 2019, she was appointed by Federal Minister for Economic Cooperation and Development Gerd Müller as co-chair (alongside Gerda Hasselfeldt) of a commission in charge of drafting recommendations on how to address the causes of displacement and migration.

== Other activities ==
- Internationaler Demokratiepreis Bonn, Member of the Board of Trustees
- German Foundation for Peace Research (DSF), Ex-Officio Member of the Board (since 2009)
- Deutsche Post Stiftung, Member of the Scientific Council
- German Society for the United Nations (DGVN), Member
- Stadtwerke Bonn, Chairwoman of the Supervisory Board (2004-2009)

== Recognition ==
In 2005 and 2006 Dieckmann was a finalist for World Mayor.

== Personal life ==
Dieckmann is married to Jochen Dieckmann, former Minister of Justice, Minister of Finance, and Chairman of the SPD in Northrhine-Westphalia. They have four children, including Christoph and Markus Dieckmann.

== Articles ==
Dieckmann, Bärbel: "Food and Development Go Hand in Hand", Digital Development Debates, Issue 16 "Food & Farming", 2015.

== See also ==
- List of mayors of Bonn
