= Gauri Pradhan (activist) =

Gauri Pradhan गौरी प्रधान
- Born: 5 August 1962 (age 62); Sindhulpalchok District, Bagmati Zone, Nepal

Gauri Pradhan (Nepali: गौरी प्रधान) is a prominent social activist and human rights defender in Nepal as well as in South Asia. He is the founding President of a number of national institutes including a pioneer child rights organization Child Workers in Nepal (CWIN-Nepal) established in 1987. For his work on child rights and human rights in Nepal he has been conferred with a number of national and international honors including the UNICEF Global Leadership on the Rights of the Child in 2000 along with Nelson Mandela, the former President of South Africa. Gauri Pradhan currently holds an office as a Commissioner and Spokesperson of the National Human Rights Commission (NHRC), a constitutional organ of Nepal.
