= Child labour in Nepal =

The incidence of child labour in Nepal is relatively high compared with other countries in South Asia. According to the Nepal Labour Force Survey in 2008, 86.2% of the children who were working were also studying, while 13.8% of the working children were not.

Table 1: Child Labour Force Participation Rates over time
Year	Total	Male	Female	Area of Residence	
Year	Total	Male	Female	Urban	Rural
1996	41.7	36.1	47.6	23.0	43.4
2004	32.0	30.2	32.5	12.4	33.9
2008	33.9	30.2	37.8	14.4	36.7
2010	44.0	41.0	48.0	31.0	46.0

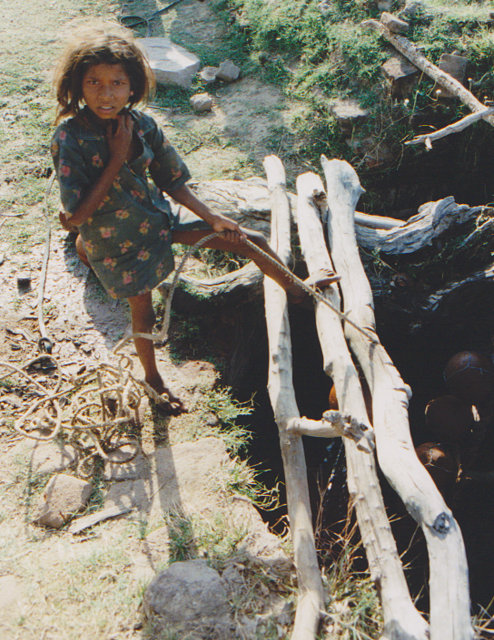
Young Nepali girl working in the fields of Nepal

Most children (60.5%) worked up to 19 hours in 2008, while 32.2% worked 20 to 40 hours a week and 7.3% worked for more than 40 hours in a week. This trend is consistent in both rural and urban areas. The 2003/2004 Nepal Living Standards Survey Statistical Report Volume II noted that the poorest consumption quintile has the highest percentage (18.7%) of child laborers who for more than 40 hours a week as compared with the rest of the consumption quintile. Also, according to Edmonds (2006) female children work more hours than their male siblings. In the same study, Edmonds states that the majority of child labourers work in the agricultural sector and in domestic labour.

According to Ray (2004), child schooling and child labour force participation rates are negatively correlated, as there is a trade-off between the two variables. Thus, an increase in labour hours would mean lesser time for schooling, and lesser work hours equals to an increase in time spent for schooling.

== Definition ==
The International Labour Organization (ILO) defines child labour as "work that deprives children of their childhood, their potential and their dignity, and that is harmful to physical and mental development". This includes work that interferes with schooling, separates children from their families, or exposes children to serious hazards. The ILO's definition of child labour does not include work done outside of school hours or assistance provided to family. Their reasoning is that these activities are beneficial to a child's development. While the age that someone is considered a child is different in different countries UNICEF defines child labour as someone who is between 5 and 14 years old involved in economic activity or domestic work.

== Industries using child labour ==
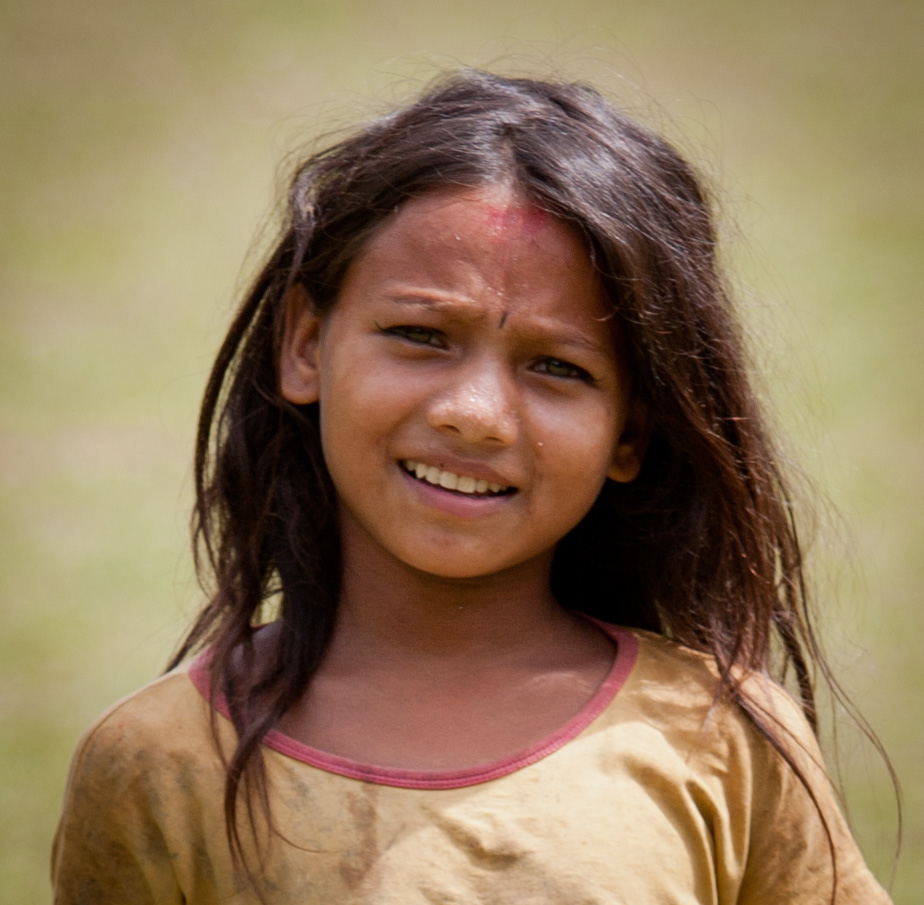
Young girl working in the fields of Tansen, Nepal

The NLFS also found that 88.7% of the working children are being employed in the agricultural sector. 1.4% of employed children work in the manufacturing sector, 0.3% work in construction sector, 1.6% work in wholesale and retail trade, 1.0% work in hotels and restaurants, 0.1% work in private households with employed persons, and 6.9% work in other types of industries. About 78.1% of children working in the agricultural sector are engaged in subsistence farming.

In 2013, the U.S. Department of Labor reported that children in Nepal are engaged "in agriculture and the worst forms of child labor in commercial sexual exploitation". The report indicated other industrial activities like mining and stone breaking, weaving, and domestic service. In 2014, the Department's List of Goods Produced by Child Labor or Forced Labor reported bricks, carpets, embellished textiles and stones as goods produced in such labor conditions by both child laborers and forced workers.

=== Agriculture ===
According to Edmonds (2006) the majority of children in the labour force work in the agricultural field. They also report that children aged 6–15 years old spend 9.2 hours a week working in the agriculture industry, with many more hours spent in other types of work. The agricultural sector is very dangerous for children, due to their exposure to harmful chemicals and dangerous weather conditions. Fafchamps (2006) also reports that a child in Nepal is likely to be working in the agricultural sector if their parents are agricultural laborers and if they are located 3–7 hours away from an urban center. Even though these children spend a significant amount of time working in the fields they are often not counted in national statistics as being economically active. With all of this said, Abdulai (1999) reports that children working in the agricultural field do not significantly impact the agricultural output of Nepal.

=== Military ===
The Communist Party of Nepal [CPN(M)] was composed of the People's Liberation Army and the Royal Nepal Army. They instigated the Nepalese Civil War in 1996 because the Nepali government refused to address social and economic injustices. During the Nepalese Civil War the People's Liberation Army and the Royal Nepal Army conscripted child soldiers ranging from fourteen years old to eighteen years old. Some children joined the army due to abduction and manipulation, others due to voluntary association. During the Nepalese Civil War children worked as soldiers, sentries, spies, cooks, and porters. Many Nepali child soldiers witnessed traumatic events such as bombings and violent deaths. The war happened in 1996 and in a study by Kohrt et al. in 2010, 15.5% of the surveyed children were still part of an army at the time of the study.

=== Carpet Industry ===
The carpet industry is one of the major sources of income in Nepal and children are seen as the inexpensive labour force behind it. In Nepal, about 1,800 children under fourteen years old are employed by the carpet industry. In a study by Baker (2001) all of the 162 Nepali children in the study spent more than six hours a day working in the carpet industry. "Social Labelling" is the work of non-governmental organizations to inform consumers about the conditions that the rug was made in. "Social Labeling" has been effective in reducing child labour in the carpet industry by informing consumers about the working conditions of the factory where the rug was produced, and whether they utilize child labour.

=== Domestic Labour ===
Domestic labour for children in Nepal includes childcare, cooking, shopping, fetching water, and cleaning. Some children, usually young girls, are forced into domestic labour due to human trafficking. According to Edmonds (2006) in one week children ages 6–15 spend 4.3 hours doing domestic work. Girls typically have to do significantly more domestic work than their male siblings, and the hours girls spend on domestic work increases when there are siblings added to the household while the hours boys spend on domestic work generally stays the same.

== Causes of child labour ==
=== Poverty ===
Poverty is a major cause of child labour in Nepal and is often coupled with lack of education according to a study by Ersado (2005). Poverty is a driver of child labour because the costs of schooling is very high and the immediate economic benefit of child labour is enticing according to Stash (2001). Not having access to schooling often leads parents to find employment for their children. Children who are enrolled in school often have to work in order to afford the costs of schooling. Many parents do not want their children to be idle during the day but cannot enroll them in school due to the high cost. According to Ranjan (2002) this leads many parents to involve their children in the labour force. Entering the labour force has immediate economic benefits for the parents, while the economic benefits from educating their children would be long term.

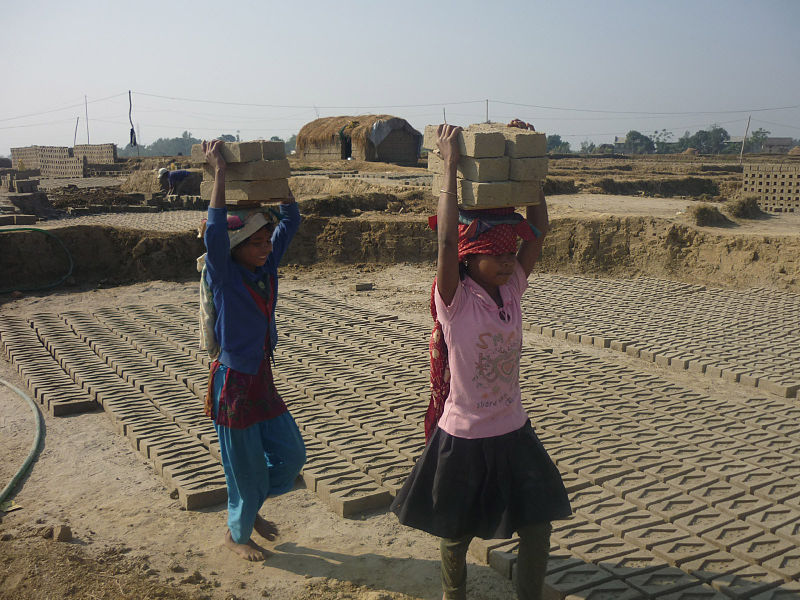
Young girls working in the brick kilns of Nepal

=== Gender Inequality ===
Many parents in Nepal believe that female children should be at home doing domestic work instead of going to school according to Jamison (1987). Their reasoning is that there would not be enough people supporting the household and that girls will be given away in marriage anyway. Girls who do go to school are still expected to do the same amount of labour because they typically do domestic work, while boys do less labour when they are enrolled in school because they typically do market work. According to Edmonds (2003), female children are more likely to be involved with child labour than male children. Girls also tend to work more hours than boys, especially the oldest girl. The more children a family has, the more hours the oldest female child works. When a male child is added to the family both the oldest female and male siblings have to work an extra 1.5 hours a week, and when a female child is added to the family only the oldest female child has to work extra hours. This inequality persists to adulthood, as seen by Nepal's low score on the Gender-related Development Index (GDI). Nepal has a score of 0.545, as compared to Canada's score of 0.959.

== Impact ==
=== Education ===
Even though schooling increases a child's future income, there is a low enrollment rate by poor families. Parents may feel that by enrolling their children in school they are missing out on the income that they could bring in immediately. This effect is seen in a study by Ray (2002) found that increasing the labour market activity of a child negatively affects their schooling experience. When a child is involved with the labour force they are less likely to be enrolled in school. This effect is seen much more strongly in girls than in boys.

=== Mental Health ===
There is a higher proportion of mental illnesses such as anxiety and post traumatic stress disorder (PTSD) for Nepali child soldiers than for Nepali children who were never conscripted. This is especially true for female child soldiers as found in a study about the mental health of conscripted child soldiers by Kohrt (2008). Female child soldiers also experienced gender-based stigma from their community after their work in the military. One year after the war 55% of the child soldiers participating in the study were found to have PTSD.

=== Economic Development ===
According to Galli (2001), in the long run, child labour impedes long run economic growth through slower rate of human capital accumulation. One way in which human capital is accumulated is through education. As working takes up time for children to go to school, rate of human capital accumulation is negatively affected. Also, child labour is expanding as the economy is growing, which some see as an indication of a flawed economy. Nonetheless, a study by Ersado (2005) found that children in Nepal contribute about 7% of the household income, which is quite high compared to other developing countries.

== Responses ==
=== Organizations ===
Given the seriousness of the issue of child labour in Nepal, there are thousands of Governmental Organizations and numerous international non-governmental organizations that work in Nepal to tackle the problem of child labour through improving educational standards.

==== International Labour Organization ====
One of the goals of this organization is to eliminate the worst forms of child labour in Nepal. They would like to strengthen the monitoring systems for child labour in order to prevent and identify the emerging sectors of child labour. They also plan to assist the Government of Nepal to endorse a hazardous child labour list.

==== Children and Women in Social Service and Human Rights (CWISH) ====
The goal of CWISH is to create a respectful environment towards human rights, with a focus on child rights. They work to protect children from violence, sexual abuse, harassment, physical and humiliating punishment, bullying, neglect, trafficking, child labour and child marriage. They advocate for better policies, better implementation, and child education along with assisting vulnerable children and their families. Some of their accomplishments include helping 157495 Nepali children and has completed 83 projects. One of these projects included establishing 11 municipalities that monitor child labour.

==== Educate the Children ====
Educate the Children began by matching sponsors with disadvantaged children in Nepal in order to provide education. They have since expanded their program to improving women's literacy and community development. The three programs they currently run involve children’s education, women’s empowerment, and sustainable agricultural development. Regarding children's education ETC has started an early education program that was lacking in Nepal. They have also provided scholarships to help keep children in schools, and have focused their efforts on girls. In addition to this ETC has improved the quality of education and schooling conditions.

=== Proposed Solutions ===
Increasing access to banks could decrease the amount of child labour in Nepal. Ersado (2005) found that in rural Nepal, access to a commercial bank positively affects child schooling and negatively affects child labor because access to credit allows a family to have a more stable income and have enough money to send their child to school.

Another proposed solution is to provide incentives for parents to send their kids to school. This could include providing enrollment subsidies and cash transfers with the condition that they enroll their children in school.

Banning child labour may seem like a simple solution but its implications are that it would be very difficult to enforce the ban and it would come at a huge, immediate cost to the poor. Also, banning child labour in one sector could lead children to enter other, more dangerous sectors such as prostitution.

== See also ==
- Human rights in Nepal
