= Gender inequality in Nepal =

Gender inequality in Nepal refers to disparities and inequalities between men and women in Nepal, a landlocked country in South Asia. Gender inequality is defined as unequal treatment and opportunities due to perceived differences based solely on issues of gender. Gender inequality is a major barrier for human development worldwide as gender is a determinant for the basis of discrimination in various spheres such as health, education, political representation, and labor markets. Although Nepal is modernizing and gender roles are changing, the traditionally patriarchal society creates systematic barriers to gender equality.

== Global rankings ==
According to the World Economic Forum, the 2016 Global Gender Index reveals that Nepal ranks 110th out of 144 countries on gender parity. Nepal score for this index is 0.661, with 1 representing gender parity. The United Nations Development Programme's (UNDP) Gender Inequality Index gave Nepal a score of 0.497 in 2015 with 0 representing equality. In this index, which measures reproductive health, empowerment and economic status, Nepal ranks 115th out of 188 countries for gender equality. In addition, United Nations Women found that Nepal ranks 110th out of 145 countries in the Global Gender Gap Index.

== Recent history ==
=== The People's War ===
Recent political conflict in Nepal, known as the People's War from 1996 to 2006, was initiated by the Maoist Communist Party, the CPN-M, in opposition of the monarchy. Additional factors contributing to political conflict at this time were economic stagnation, high unemployment, poor education, impoverishment, continuing discrimination and an increasing gap between the elite and the rest of the country. The political infighting, corruption and slow progress drew in support from disenfranchised groups, including women, because the CPN-M promised to end the feudal monarchy, nationalize the state's resources and redistribute wealth. The CPN-M submitted a 40-point set of demands to the government in 1996, with one demand specifically calling for the equality of women: "Patriarchal exploitation and discrimination against women should be stopped. Daughters should be allowed access to paternal property."

The opposition became an insurgent movement, causing an armed conflict. The All Nepal Women's Association (Revolutionary) was formed through the CPN-M to organize grassroots campaigns against caste and gender discrimination throughout the war, encouraging women to become action oriented and participants in the insurgency. Many women believed that a struggle for democratic rights should also be a struggle for women's rights, demanding for legal equality, political participation and socioeconomic empowerment. Throughout the People's War, women were political activists and guerilla soldiers, making up 40 percent of the militia, as well as victims of sexual violence. After a decade of conflict, over 13,000 people died and over 200,000 were displaced.

The insurgency ended with the November 2006 Comprehensive Peace Agreement by the Government of Nepal and the CPN-M. Eventually, an interim government that included the Maoists was established. In December 2007, Nepal abolished the traditional monarchy and was declared a republic. When elections were held in April 2008, this was the first vote in Nepal for over nine years. CPN-M representatives won a majority of the seats, which qualified them as the largest party in the constitutional assembly at the time. The new constitutional assembly held in May 2008 officially ended the 240-year rule of monarchy in Nepal. An unprecedented number of women and people from marginalized communities won seats in this new constitutional assembly.

=== 2015 Constitution ===
The Constitution of Nepal 2015 was established in response to the decade-long conflict of the People's War, claiming that Nepal will adopt federalism. The ratification of the constitution was fast-tracked in order to fulfill a decade old peace commitment and focus on reconstruction in response to the 2015 Nepal Earthquake. The new document established the boundaries of seven states, but controversy surrounds whether Nepal should be ethnically delineated. Deependra Jha, a Supreme Court lawyer based in Kathmandu, claims that there is unequal representation of ethnic groups, stating that "the electoral system needs to be reformed. State No. 2, with a population of 5.4 million, and state No, 6, with a population of 1.5 million, will each have equal representation of eight seats. The hill-dominated political class has gerrymandered on boundary issues to ensure that Khas Arya, upper caste hill people, remain a majority in six out of seven federal states." In addition, parliament is now elected by a smaller proportional representation than before, 45 percent compared to 58 percent after the People's War. However, the proportional representation system has promoted equal representation of indigenous and low-caste groups get elected and the new constitution threatens equal representation.

In regards to women, the constitution denies the ability for women to pass citizenship onto their children, but men have virtually no barriers to pass citizenship onto their children. A foreign spouse of a Nepali man can obtain Nepali citizenship soon after the marriage; however, there is no such provision for foreign spouses of Nepali women. Thus, single Nepali women or those married to a foreign spouse are not able to pass citizenship onto their children, which creates a growing group of stateless children without guaranteed access to rights and privileges such as education and health care. Therefore, 2.1 million people will remain stateless in Nepal, and because of the new constitution, that number is expected to grow.

== Economic inequalities ==
=== Occupational distribution ===
Although the population of working-age females in the country is higher than that of males, females still lag far behind when it comes to employment and the pay gap between the genders is also huge. Out of the total paid employees in Nepal, only 22 percent are women. Only 8.3 percent of women in the labor force are paid. Women disproportionally represent low skill occupations such as craft work and service work because of their high levels of illiteracy and few years of schooling. Families' gender stereotypes and cultural norms also shaped women's participation in labor markets. Men overrepresent employment in occupations that demand more education after primary school, such as technicians and engineers. Women represent around 12 percent of the population engage in migrant labor to places like the Gulf and Malaysia. Their limited mobility to work abroad is a product of historic and patriarchal ideas that women should remain in the household. The wage gap in Nepal is stark: women earn 60 percent of what men earn in formal economic sectors.

Nepal's major economic activity is agriculture, providing a livelihood for over 75 percent of the total population. Unless women work in agriculture, employment prospects for women in other sectors are limited. Furthermore, in recent years Nepal has been experiencing a feminization of agriculture. While men are increasingly moving into nonagricultural work or migrating to urban areas or outside of Nepal for employment, women are taking over agricultural activities traditional shared between men and women. Women constitute around 52 percent of Nepal's total population and around 75 to 80 percent of women are engaged in agriculture as their primary occupation. Regardless, only a fraction of these women are paid and the rest are self-employed by working on their families' subsistence farms.

Although workforce participation for women is low due to religious and traditional values, more women are entering the workforce because of improvements in education, later marriages, declining fertility rates, shifts in cultural attitudes toward women and economic needs.

=== Unpaid work ===
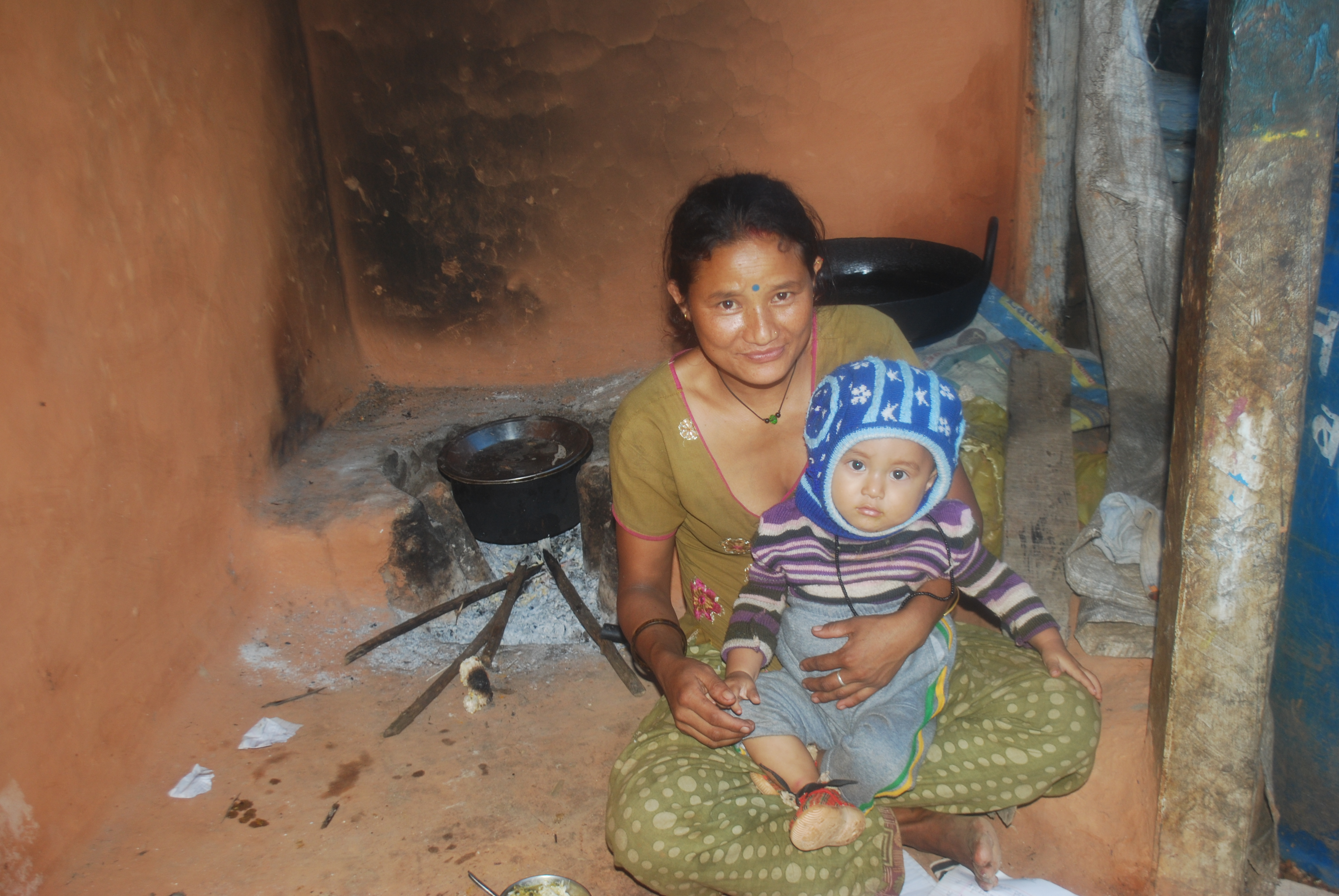
Nepali housewife in her home with child.

Unpaid work means the production of goods or services in a household or community that are not sold on a market such as child care, caring for the elderly, and housework. Women outperform men in unpaid work and all forms of labor in Nepal. On average, women spend four hours a day performing unpaid work, while men spend less than an hour. When considering all forms of labor, paid and unpaid, ActionAid found that Nepali women work 1.4 hours for every one hour worked by Nepali men. Because unpaid work is non-monetary and privatize labor in the household, it is difficult to quantify the economic contribution of such work; thus, unpaid work is typically seen as less valuable than paid labor.

Married women are typically more responsible for caring for their husband's parents than her own. Many Nepali women move in with their husband's parents after marriage and usually do not have say in the matter. Therefore, sons are viewed as security for their parents during old age while their wives are viewed as unpaid care takers. To prepare for their responsibilities after marriage, sons are then more likely to be sent to school in order to earn money for the future and daughters stay at home to perform housework. Such patriarchal norms lead to less female participation in household decision-making processes.

== Education inequalities ==
=== School enrollment ===
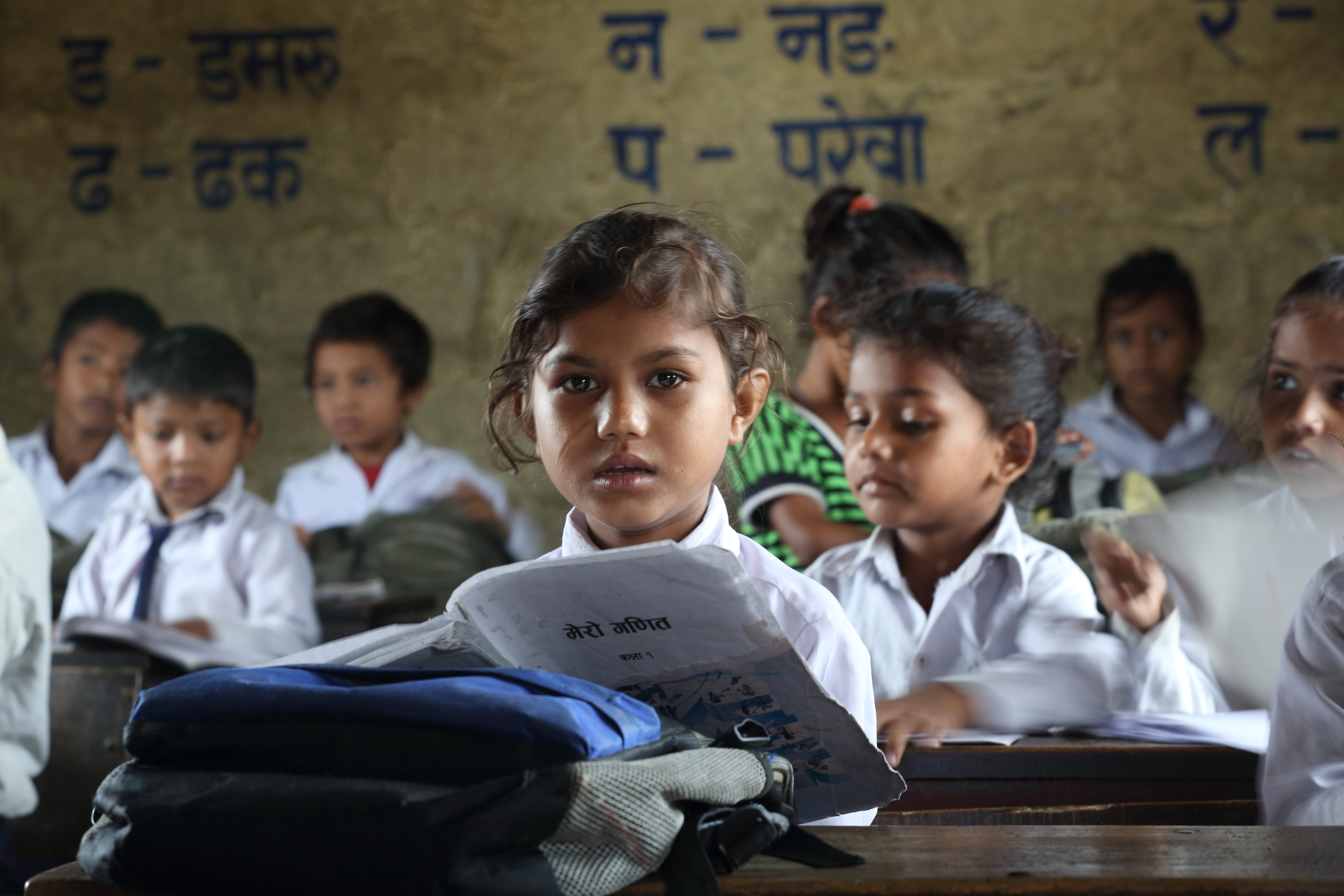
Grade 1 student reading a book at Sahara Bal Primary School in Pokhara, Nepal.

Gender is the single strongest determinant of school participation among rural youth in Nepal. Furthermore, education inequality based on gender reflects social inequality in Nepal. Young girls are more likely to obtain less years of schooling than boys because their parents view their children's preparation for their adult marital roles differently based on gender. Women are expected to leave their families' household for their husbands' after marriage. Additionally, non-agricultural employment is more common for men than women and cultural traditions expect more domestic work to be fulfilled by women than men. High priority to boys' education is also attributed to the fact that girls have less time to do school work in order to complete their household chores. Girls are more likely to fail national examination than boys due to a difference in available time to study outside of class and, ultimately, are less likely to enroll in education after primary school. Therefore, young girls are less likely to receive a formal education. Families are also more likely to enroll sons in private schools and enroll daughters in public schools. It is not surprising then that there are less men who never attended school (23 percent) compared to women who never attended school (44 percent). UNESCO also found that 50 percent of students in primary school will drop out before secondary school. High drop out rates for females is mainly caused by child marriages. Too much schooling for women can also result in less marriage opportunities.

In addition to gender differences, there are also caste and ethnic differences in school participation and attrition from primary school. As in other major regions of South Asia, caste and ethnicity are closely linked to socioeconomic status. Studies show that caste stratification reflects education attainment. Thus, there are greater disparities in school enrollment for children from the poorest families than the richest families. Literacy rates are much lower for lower-caste families than higher-caste families. In addition, children from lower-castes are more likely to drop out of school than children from higher-castes.

Although girls who enter school progress at an equal rate with boys through the primary grades, there are less girls enrolled in primary school compared to boys. Regardless of performance, girls are often harassed by their teachers and male peers, particularly experiencing such behavior more in math classes. Research also shows that teachers have lower expectations for female students than male students.

=== Literacy ===
As seen in the table below, literacy rates are much higher for urban women than rural women. Literacy rates decrease as age increases for both genders because more Nepali youth are attending school today than in the decade prior. However, regardless of geographic location or age group, men have higher literacy rates than women. Although literacy rates are increasing, men's literacy rates are still higher than women's due to unequal access to formal education and enrollment in schooling.

Urban-rural gender disparities in literacy
Location	Urban			Rural		
Age Group	Women	Men	Total	Women	Men	Total
15 years and above	65.8%	87%	75.6%	39.1%	67.2%	51.3%
6 years and above	75.3%	89.4%	82.5%	53.9%	73%	61.3%

== Health inequalities ==
=== Healthcare ===
Barriers to healthcare and service utilization in Nepal are attributed to geographical accessibility, limited health infrastructure, political instability, lack of resources, women's low status in society, a poor communication system in rural areas, and shortage of trained health professionals. Poor road infrastructure and a lack of public transportation add additional barriers to health services, especially in rural areas, because health facilities are concentrated mainly in urban areas. Expenditures for health care are often in the hands of men or older females, which may prevent younger women from seeking care for their own health problems. When medical professionals are available, Nepali husbands may be reluctant to send their wives for medical services when only a male doctor is available. Ultimately, women's participation in household decision-making, employment, influence over their earnings greatly determines health outcomes of women.

Traditionally, mothers-in-law act as primary caretakers of pregnant women. However, women describe feeling more comfortable in discussing their emotional and physical health with their husbands over their mothers-in-law. Studies show that when men participate in health interventions, women's health improves. Furthermore, research shows that women learn and retrain the most health-related information, such as family planning, when they are educated with their partners.

=== Maternal and reproductive health ===
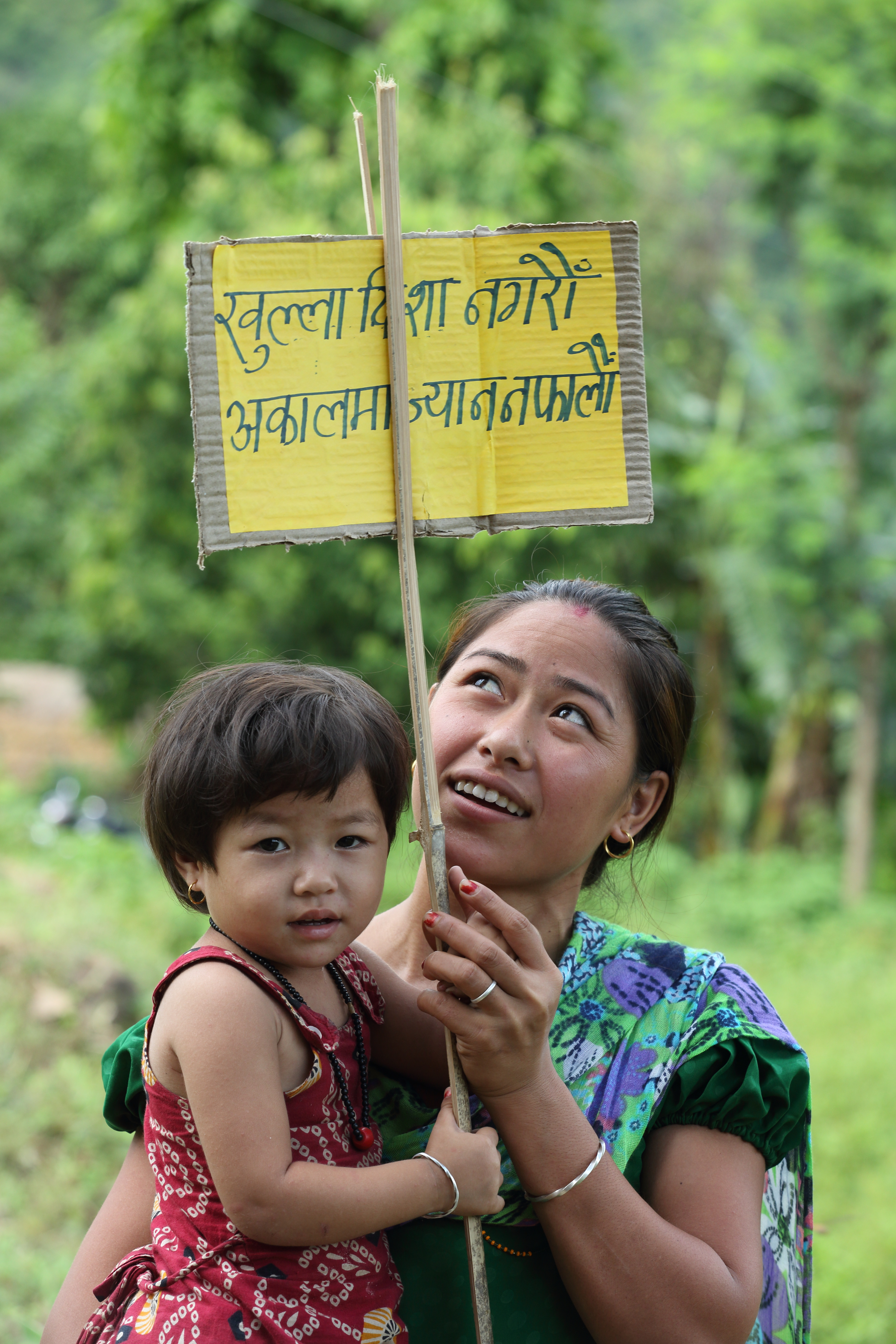
Nepali woman with child.

Strong son preference in Nepal affects contraceptive usage, family size, pregnancy rates, sex distribution of children and birth intervals. Such gender bias leads to sex-selective abortions, prompting gender inequality and discrimination before birth. Although the government does provide primary maternal healthcare through health posts, access and quality are limited because facilities are poorly equipped with staff that lack adequate training. Access to maternal health is also strongly determined by household economic status not only because income reflects the ability to pay for medical services, but also access to transportation and geographic accessibility. Therefore, a majority of births happen at the home. In addition, child birth is seen to be a natural process and many women do not regularly seek check-ups. Thus, high rates of Maternal Mortality are attributed to a lack of skilled birth attendants, unsafe and unhygienic birthing practices and the absence of emergency services or safe home births in rural communities. Maternal mortality is also attributed to a lack of decision-making power, educational awareness, excessive physical labor and poor nutrition. Nepal had one of the highest maternal mortality rates in the world; however, the rate has decreased in the past decade by 50 percent. In 2014, the maternal mortality was 258 for every 100,000 births, the lowest rate ever experienced in Nepal.

Nepal has a high incidence of adolescent pregnancy: 40 percent of married girls ages 15–19 have already given birth to at least one child. The World Bank found that half of women ages 15–49 use contraceptives. Many young women in Nepal lack decision-making power in regards to their sexuality, contraceptive use, and family size. Most women are unable to use family planning services without permission of their husbands and families. Sex education is still taboo and not offered in most schools. Unsafe abortions also contribute to the high maternal mortality rate in Nepal as abortion was illegal until 2004. Although abortion is now legal, the social stigma and limited access to safe abortion services impedes women's maternal and reproductive health.

== Familial inequalities ==
=== Decision making in the household ===
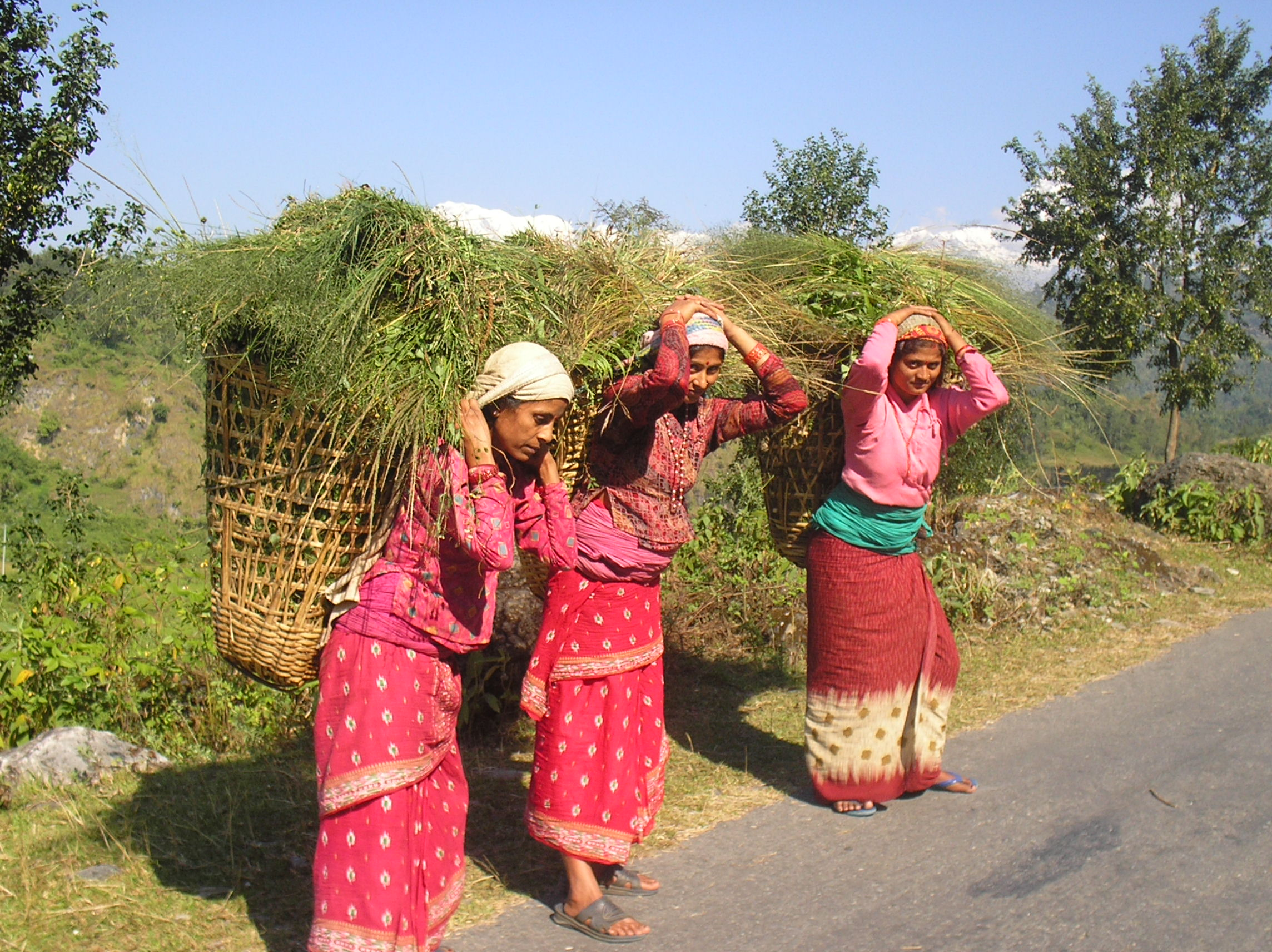
घाँसको भारी बोकी गन्तव्य तर्फ फर्कदै गरेका महिलाहरु Nepali women in their typical dress in household work

Women's autonomy in household decision-making is less than men's. Such power to make decisions is associated with women's ethnicity, deprivation level, urban/rural classification, education, and number of living children. The patriarchal family structure and religious values explain the unequal decision-making power between men and women in the household. Many women in Nepal hold the view that it is in their dharma, their religion, moral duty and universal law, to be obedient, respectful, and pleasing to their husbands. Women from middle and richer class as well as women from orthodox Hindu communities are typically confined to domestic labor and thus have the least decision-making power. Remote, poor and rural women experience more autonomy in household decision-making because of their involvement in income generating activities, adding a significant contribution to family income. Thus, contribution to family income creates more perceived equality between women and men as equal partners.

=== Child marriage ===
Early marriage is a societal norm in Nepal and is reflective of patriarchal values. Nepal has the third highest rate of childhood marriage in Asia. Disproportionately affecting women, 40 percent of marriages involve girls 15 years of age. Many women begin having children before the age of 20, especially in rural areas and the Terai region. Many young girls in rural areas are married right after puberty and sometimes before, with sexual activity soon to follow. Parents are largely in control of their daughters' child marriage and poor families do not want to spend limited resources on daughters if their daughters cannot provide to the family's income. Thus, young girls are perceived to be a burden for their parents and sons are expected to take care of their parents in old age. There is also a culturally value on virginity; thus, early marriage increases the likelihood that a woman remains "pure" until marriage. In addition, early marriage is desired for submissive wives since younger women are more likely to depend on their families. Women largely do not have say when the marriage is arranged by their parents. However, forms of marriage are slowly shifting from arranged marriage to "love" marriage with parental approval.

Early arranged marriage and early childbearing are associated with lower levels of women's autonomy, access to education and employment opportunities for women relative to men. Serious health consequences from child marriage include early pregnancy and pregnancy complications. Young girls forced into child marriages are also at greater risk of abuse, domestic violence and abandonment.

Although the 2015 Constitution of Nepal outlaws child marriage as a punishable offense, marriage without consent is not clearly prohibit and many families find loopholes around the law. The earthquake in 2015 was expected to increase the number of child marriages because young girls were being raped in makeshift shelters and families were marrying their daughters to older men as a form of protection against sexual violence.

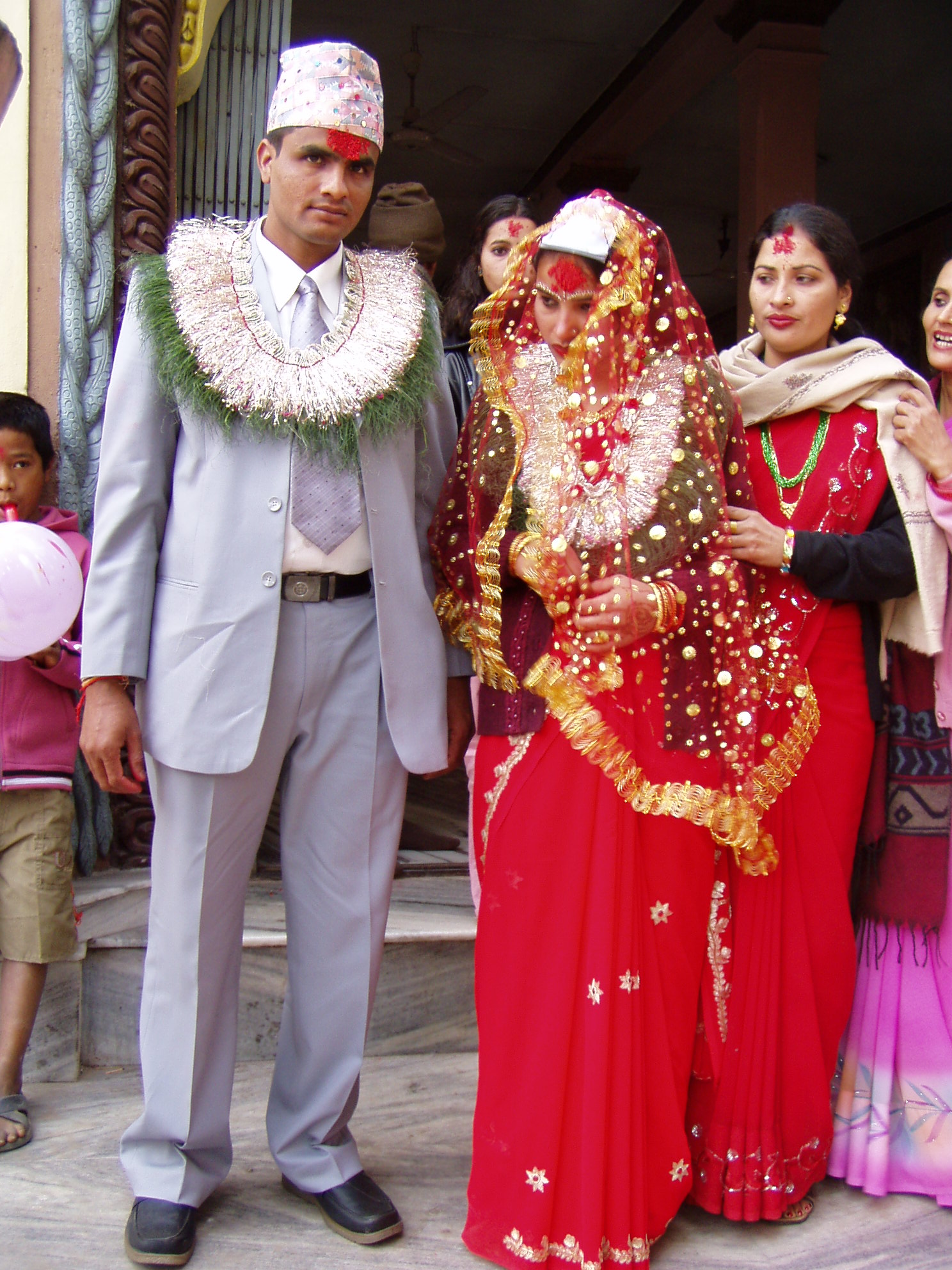
Nepali couple after their wedding ceremony.

=== Rape ===
Nepal outlawed marital rape in 2006.

=== Dowry ===
Dowry is a cultural tradition in which the family of the bride gives cash and gifts to the family of the groom for the purpose of supporting a new couple. However, dowry has contributed to women's financial dependency on men and is closely linked to child marriage. Age and education level increase dowry; thus, marrying daughters younger is cheaper and the only option for many families in poverty. Violence can occur if not enough dowry is offered such as beating, forbidden from the home, and bride burning. The dowry system is illegal in Nepal, but the government has yet to take systematic actions against child brides suffering from dowry-related harassment.

== Legal inequalities ==
=== Citizenship ===
4.3 million people in Nepal are considered to be stateless. In order for a child born in Nepal to become a citizen, both parents must be citizens. Unlike children born to Nepali fathers and foreign mothers, children born with a Nepali mother married to a foreign spouse are not granted citizenship. Citizenship is determined by blood; however, this policy does not provide equal access to citizenship for women who are migrant workers or victims of human trafficking. These laws disproportionately affect women since there are 900,000 children of single mothers without citizenship in Nepal compared to 71,000 children of single fathers.

=== Property rights ===
Land rights and inheritance for women are usually defined in terms of their relation to men. Although distribution of land is different between caste and ethnic groups, the overall social norm is for women to not own land. Less than 10 percent of women own around 5 percent of land throughout Nepal. Additionally, only 11 percent of women have effective control over their property.

== Violence against women ==
=== Sexual violence ===
Sexual violence within or outside of marriage is considered a major public health problem and abuse of human rights in Nepal. Rates of sexual violence vary between caste and ethnic groups. For example, 55 percent Tharu, a lower-caste group, women reported experiencing sexual violence within marriage compared to 42 percent of Brahmin and Chhetri women, a higher-caste group. These differences may be due to the lower levels of education and higher levels of alcohol consumption among Tharu than amongst Brahmin/Chhetri men and women.

Factors that lead to sexual violence within marriage include gender expectations, economic dependence of women, poverty, alcohol consumption of husband, lack of knowledge, social stigma, and lack of supportive familial and social environments. Many women claim that they are not able to protect themselves from sexual violence within their marriage and suffer from psychological health problems following these experiences. Research shows that young women experiencing sexual violence are isolated and lack support options. Although sexual violence within marriage is illegal, local police and law agencies are still unaware that such laws exist. Many women suffered from physical, verbal and sexual assault during the 10-year conflict period called the People's War. In addition, many women are afraid to speak out against their attacker in fear of retaliation or of the social stigma surrounding victims of sexual violence . Limitations on reporting rape cases were recently extended in 2015 from 35 days to 180 days; however, many human rights activists claim that there should be no time limitations on reporting rape.

Nepal outlawed marital rape in 2006.

=== Human trafficking ===
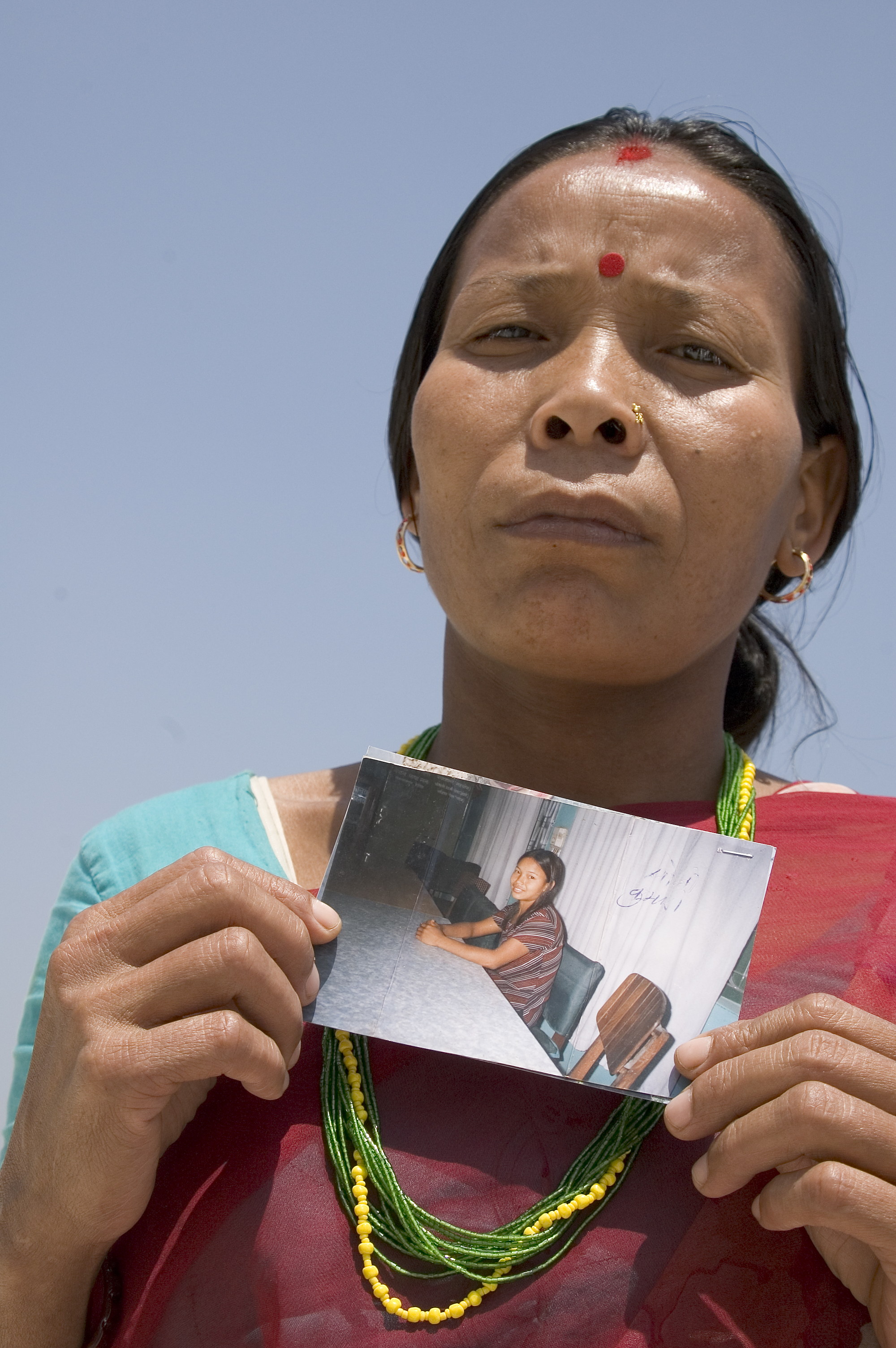
This mother traveled from her village in Nepal to Mumbai, India, hoping to find and rescue her teenage daughter who was trafficked into an Indian brothel.

Human trafficking is the exploitation of people for forced labor or sexual exploitation and an extreme violation of human rights. In Nepal, victims are commonly trafficked from rural areas to the urban centers. Trafficking for sexual exploitation is a highly profitable business that targets vulnerable populations. The earthquake in 2015 increased the risk for human trafficking due to increased vulnerability and a lack of security. Many children were separated from their families during the earthquake and were at greater risk for human trafficking. Men, women and children experience human trafficking and UNODC Global Report in Trafficking 2012 estimates that child victims, below age of 16 years, accounted for 36 percent of all trafficking victims in Nepal. People who are trafficked to perform forced labor typically become domestic servants, beggars, factory workers, mine workers, and are oftentimes forced into the entertainment industry, including in circuses and pornography. In addition, many children from remote, poor areas are trafficked into orphanages to extract money from wealthy foreigners who intend to donate money and volunteer with the children. 80 percent of these orphanages are located in Kathmandu, Pokhara and Chitwan, the most popular tourist spots in the country. However, 85 percent of children in these orphanages have at least one living parent.

Many Nepali people trafficked across borders are from remote hill villages or poor border communities. Most victims of human trafficking are sent to India and the Middle East. Nepal and Bangladesh are the largest supplies of human capital to India's sex exploitation market, mainly in brothels. Estimates claim that 12,000 to 15,000 Nepali girls are trafficked from Nepal each year. Most of girls, an estimated 5,000 to 10,000 of them each year, are trafficked to India. Overall, 100,000 to 200,000 Nepali people are estimated to be trafficked in India today.

The consequences of trafficking affects victims' physical, emotional and mental health. Women experiencing human sex trafficking have high prevalence of HIV infection. Almost all female sex-workers experience depression, anxiety and/or PTSD at significantly higher rates than non-sex workers. Beyond the health consequences of human trafficking, one of the greatest risk factors of human trafficking, especially for women, is poverty.

=== Witch-hunts ===
Witch-hunts in Nepal are common, and are targeted especially against low-caste women. The main causes of witchcraft related violence include widespread belief in superstition, lack of education, lack of public awareness, illiteracy, caste system, male domination, and economic dependency of women on men. The victims of this form of violence are often beaten, tortured, publicly humiliated, and murdered. Sometimes, the family members of the accused are also assaulted. In 2010, Sarwa Dev Prasad Ojha, minister for women and social welfare, said, "Superstitions are deeply rooted in our society, and the belief in witchcraft is one of the worst forms of this."

== Third gender ==
Third gender is a concept in which individuals are categorized, either by themselves or by society, as neither man nor woman. Recently, transgender people are now legally recognized in Nepal on official documents under a separate "third gender" category. This legislative process has also been extended to other countries such as India and Pakistan and is perceived to be a massive political victory. Despite the victory, transgender people experience high rates of discrimination, violence, harassment and economic vulnerability compared to men because of cultural taboos associated with non-binary gender identification.

== See also ==
- Human rights in Nepal
- LGBT rights in Nepal
- Women in Nepal
- Human trafficking in Nepal
- Education in Nepal
- Health in Nepal
- Chhaupadi
