= Christopher B. Barrett =

Economist (Cornell University)

- Born: Christopher Brendan Barrett; November 26, 1963 (age 62)
- Spouse: Clara
- Children: 5

Academic background
- Education: BA, history, 1984, Princeton University; MS, 1985, University of Oxford; PhD, 1994, University of Wisconsin–Madison
- Thesis: Peasants, prices and markets in Madagascar: toward an understanding of agricultural supply response to liberalization in a smallholder economy (1994)

Academic work
- Institutions: Charles H. Dyson School of Applied Economics and Management; Utah State University
- Website: barrett.dyson.cornell.edu

Christopher Brendan Barrett (born November 26, 1963) is an American agricultural and development economist. He is the Stephen B. and Janice G. Ashley Professor of Applied Economics and Management and International Professor of Agriculture at Cornell University's Charles H. Dyson School of Applied Economics and Management. Barrett is also the co-editor-in-chief of the journal Food Policy and former captain with the United States Army Reserve. He was elected a member of the National Academy of Sciences in 2022. He is the most cited author of a number of agriculture journals such as American Journal of Agricultural Economics, Food Policy, Journal of Development Studies.

== Early life and education ==
Barrett was born on November 26, 1963. He grew up on the east coast of the United States following his father's retirement from the Marine Corps. Barrett earned his Bachelor of Arts degree in history from Princeton University where he also joined the United States Army Reserve and Reserve Officers' Training Corps. After graduating in 1984, he received a Fulbright scholarship to study at the University of Oxford. After completing his M. Sc. degree he was called into temporary active duty by the United States Army. From 1985 until the early 1990s he served as an officer in the United States Army Reserve and National Guard while working in Washington as an economist with the Institute of International Finance. In 1990, he moved his family to Wisconsin in order to complete his PhD at the University of Wisconsin–Madison.

== Career ==
Upon completing his PhD, Barrett joined the faculty at Utah State University from 1994 until 1998 when he accepted a position at Cornell University. While at Cornell he has led or been actively involved in a variety of research, training and policy outreach projects promoting economic growth, poverty reduction, food security, and agricultural and rural development in Africa and Asia. One such project was a five-year, $8 million grant from the United States Agency for International Development to fund their project in collaboration with Clark Atlanta University. As co-director of Cornell's African Food Security and Natural Resources Management program, he likewise had multi-year projects supported by the National Science Foundation, including one examining the relationship between Kenyan small farmers, their communities and their land. He published two books on reforming international food assistance, starting with his 2005 volume with Dan Maxwell, Food Aid After Fifty Years: Recasting Its Role. A Pew Charitable Trusts-supported project he led resulted in a 2005 edited volume, The Social Economics of Poverty: On Identities, Communities, Groups and Networks. His research program on poverty, food insecurity, agricultural and rural development earned him various awards, including the SUNY Chancellor's Award for Excellence in Scholarship and Creative Activities in 2009, Cornell's Research and Extension Award for Outstanding Accomplishments in Science and Public Policy in 2011, the USAID Science and Technology Pioneers Prize in 2013, and the USAID Board for International Food and Agricultural Development Award for Scientific Excellence, as well as the Cornell University Graduate and Professional Student Assembly Award for Excellence in the Teaching, Advising, and Mentoring of Graduate and Professional Students, both in 2016. He was elected a Fellow of the Agricultural and Applied Economics Association in 2010, a Distinguished Fellow of the African Association of Agricultural Economists, also in 2010, and a Fellow of the American Association for the Advancement of Science (AAAS) in 2016.

In addition to his teaching and research, he served as an editor of the American Journal of Agricultural Economics from 2003 to 2008 and in various administrative positions at Cornell. In 2008, Barrett became the inaugural associate director of Cornell's David R. Atkinson Center for a Sustainable Future, a position he held until 2012. After spending the first half of 2013 in Australia on a Fulbright Senior Scholarship, Barrett was appointed the David J. Nolan Director of the Charles H. Dyson School of Applied Economics and Management. When Cornell created its new College of Business, he was named the inaugural Deputy Dean and Dean of Academic Affairs, a position he held until returning to his full-time faculty role in June 2018. In 2019, he was appointed co-editor-in-chief of the journal Food Policy.

Barrett has also held visiting positions at Monash University, the University of Melbourne, Harvard University, Stanford University, and as a Kellogg Distinguished Research Affiliate at the University of Notre Dame

== Personal life ==
Barrett and his wife Clara (née Severiens) have five children. He is a lifelong fan of the Baltimore Orioles .

== Critical acclaim ==
- Jennifer Viegas: Profile of Christopher B. Barrett. PNAS. 122 (7) e2427150122. doi:10.1073/pnas.2427150122.
