= Women's rights in Nepal =

Women in Nepal face high levels of gender discrimination. Although the constitution provides for the protection of women, including equal pay for equal work, the government has not taken significant action to implement its provisions.

== History ==
One of the first forms of discrimination against women in Nepal began with the practice of Sati, which was eradicated by Rana Prime Minister Chandra Shamsher. However, remaining issues faced by women include gender based violence, child marriage, trafficking of women, transitional justice, unequal representation, and participation of women in decision making.

In 2024, literacy rates in Nepal increased to 77.4%. The rate of literacy for females stood at 70.1%, which is lower than the male population's 85.8%.

Females face gender-based violence and this greatly limits their ability to attend school or receive proper education. Furthermore, religion restricts the opportunities for women to receive education. For example, the majority of the female Muslim population in Nepal is still deprived of basic education, with only 20% having had any level of education.

The percentage of women from rural areas who have never attended school is 51.1% (CBS, 2008), while the percentage of such women from urban areas is 25% (CBS, 2008). This is reflected in the disparity in literacy rates, between women in rural areas, 36.5%, and those in urban areas, 61.5%. Literacy rates in rural areas are almost half that in urban areas. Although overall female participation in the workforce has increased, the majority of employed women are still heavily concentrated in the low-wage and more labor-intensive industries. Formal sector female participation is 6%. According to the 2008 report from CBS, there were 155 000 male professionals, but only 48 000 female professionals, about 31% of female professionals. This is in stark contrast to female participation in the subsistence agricultural sector, with female participation almost 160% that of male participation.

Due to the growing inequality and violence against women, free legal aid was made available by the government of Nepal through the enactment of Legal Aid Act 1997, though the majority target groups of women, children and disenfranchised are unable to access it. Women's rights were only taken seriously once Nepal was under democratic rule post 1990, and a constitution was formed stating equality between men and women as a fundamental right. The newly elected democratic government ratified numerous laws and international treaties specific to women, and The Nepal Treaty Act 1990 ensured that international human rights provisions will be given preference in case of conflict with domestic laws. The laws enforced in 1990 were only finally enacted in 2006, and since the 1990s, Public Interest Litigation (PIL) was one of the key tools used by women to voice their opinions and enactment of women's rights.

The 1990s saw substantial changes in laws within Nepal, which facilitated the interest and formation of NGOs, both as recipients of these programs and as staff members of the NGOS. This began the movement of women empowerment and mobilization of women's NGOs.

Due to ongoing violence and discrimination against women, United Nations' recommendations of the Working Group on the Universal Periodic Review to Government of Nepal, March 2011 included guaranteeing full right to equality and non-discrimination between men and women in line with the international standards (with that of Italy) Furthermore, CEDAW Committee's Concluding Observations and Recommendations to Government of Nepal, August 2011 included introducing monitoring mechanisms for better implementation of laws and plans pertaining to equality and development of gender disparity indicators.

== Access to health services ==
Health services in Nepal are inadequate and insufficient and are thus reflected in the low health status of Nepalese in relation to the rest of the Southeast Asian region. The most common illnesses that females at reproductive age face are anemia and malnutrition, due to the discrimination faced in childhood and while growing up. As females, especially girls, are considered to be of the lowest status in the household, they are often the last to eat and thus do not receive the proper nutrition required. Almost 70% of females who have reached puberty suffer from these common illnesses. Also, many women often delay seeking medical help out of fear.

The maternal mortality ratio in Nepal, stands at 380 maternal deaths per 100 000 live births in 2008, according to estimates by the WHO/UNICEF/UNFPA/The World Bank. Although there has been a significant decrease as compared to the ratio of 539 per 100 000 live births in 2003, the ratio is still one of the highest in the world. Because of the inadequate provision of healthcare for pregnant mothers, they are more susceptible to death during the course of pregnancy and during labor itself. According to the Nepal Demographic and Health Survey (NDHS) 2001, about 10% of all births are carried out in the presence of a qualified doctor or medical staff. This reflects the prevalence of home births, around 81% of all births, in Nepalese society. Due to the cultural beliefs, women are generally reluctant to allow any outsiders to be present or attend to the birth. Geography has also greatly limited the availability of health services especially those in rural and mountainous regions. Even though there has been much road development in recent years, females are less impacted by it, as they remain infrequent road users.

On September 23, 2021, a group of 20-25 youth staged a protest in Kathmandu to pressure the government to remove or reduce the current tax on feminine hygiene products. There is currently a 15% customs duty, 13% Value Added Tax (VAT), and an additional 1.5% VAT on customs duties that are charged while importing the products. Sanitary pads do not fall under the list of essential items—which includes medicines, medical supplies, contraceptives, and condoms—that are exempt from VAT. Feminine hygiene products are instead taxed as luxury items, making them unaffordable for many women in Nepal.

== Restrictions to travel ==
Several laws have restricted Nepali women's right to travel and work abroad. In 2012 the government banned women under 30 from working in Gulf states, although the age threshold and geographical scope of the ban has changed. Meanwhile, Nepali women have been trafficked to other countries without much government intervention while the government restricts them from seeking employment abroad.

== Gender-based violence against women ==
Gender-based violence (GBV) towards women is a severe issue in Nepal where its women often find themselves susceptible to both public and domestic violence which constitutes rape, sexual abuse in the workplace and at home, and human trafficking. There is a persistence of harmful traditional practices deemed life-threatening such as Deuki (act of offering young girls to Hindu temples to live without proper care or education) and Chhaupadi (menstruating women are kept in a shed away from the home to live under harsh conditions). Based on the study by United Nations Population Fund's (UNFPA) entitled Gender Equality and Empowerment of Women in Nepal, abused women are more inclined to suffer from depression, anxiety, psychosomatic symptoms, sexual dysfunction and various reproductive health problems.

In the Nepal Human Rights Yearbook 2012 by Informal Sector Service Center (INSEC), a study of all 75 districts across the country returned results of 648 women as victims of violence in 2011. In addition, the number of girls under the age of 18 who were affected stands at 379.

The proportion of Nepali women who have been subjected to domestic violence are estimated at 60 to 70 per cent. Gender-based violence is worse in rural communities where an estimated 81 per cent of women experience recurring domestic violence. This includes physical abuse by husbands, polygamy, dowry-related murders, and physical and psychological harassment by household members. In 2021, 2022 and 2023, Ruby Khan led a march from Nepalgunj to Kathmandu, followed by subsequent sit-in protests, to bring attention to the disappearance and murders of women in rural Banke District.

Reasons for gender-based violence in Nepal are largely attributed to social taboos and superstitions associated with women and deeply entrenched beliefs that propagate derogatory attitudes toward female such as "Chhori ko janma hare ko karma" ("A daughter is born with a doomed fate"). Likewise, results derived from INSEC's monitoring of the situation indicated that subjecting women to domestic violence was considered a deep-rooted traditional practice. Survey results also show that 20 and 23 per cent of men and women in Nepal view domestic violence as being acceptable.

Despite efforts of various human rights and women's rights NGOs, together with international aid agencies, to lobby for the elimination of domestic violence through implementation of more effective measures, the "Domestic Violence (Crime and Punishment)" bill introduced in 2002 is at a standstill. Complaints by women's rights activists are directed towards the lackadaisical efforts of the law enforcement agencies in which disputes are settled without any charges pressed against the perpetrators. This is reflected in a statement by activist and former National Women's Commission chairperson Bandana Rana, "Often, police and local people try to settle the domestic dispute by pressing the women into accepting their 'fate' as the society is still dominated by Hindu patriarchy with its own set of strict codes—many of which are in conflict with basic rights for women".

In May 2020, during the COVID-19 pandemic, Human Rights Watch reported that social media groups are abusing Nepali women and girls online. The rights group said that offenders are using intimate photos usually obtained from victims' social media accounts and also using hacking, coercion, or blackmail as a method. The impact of such incidents harms their mental health, reputations, relationships, and access to education and employment, the report added.

== See also ==
- Women in Nepal
- Third gender rights in Nepal
