= Awudu Abdulai =

Ghanaian scholar (born 1958)

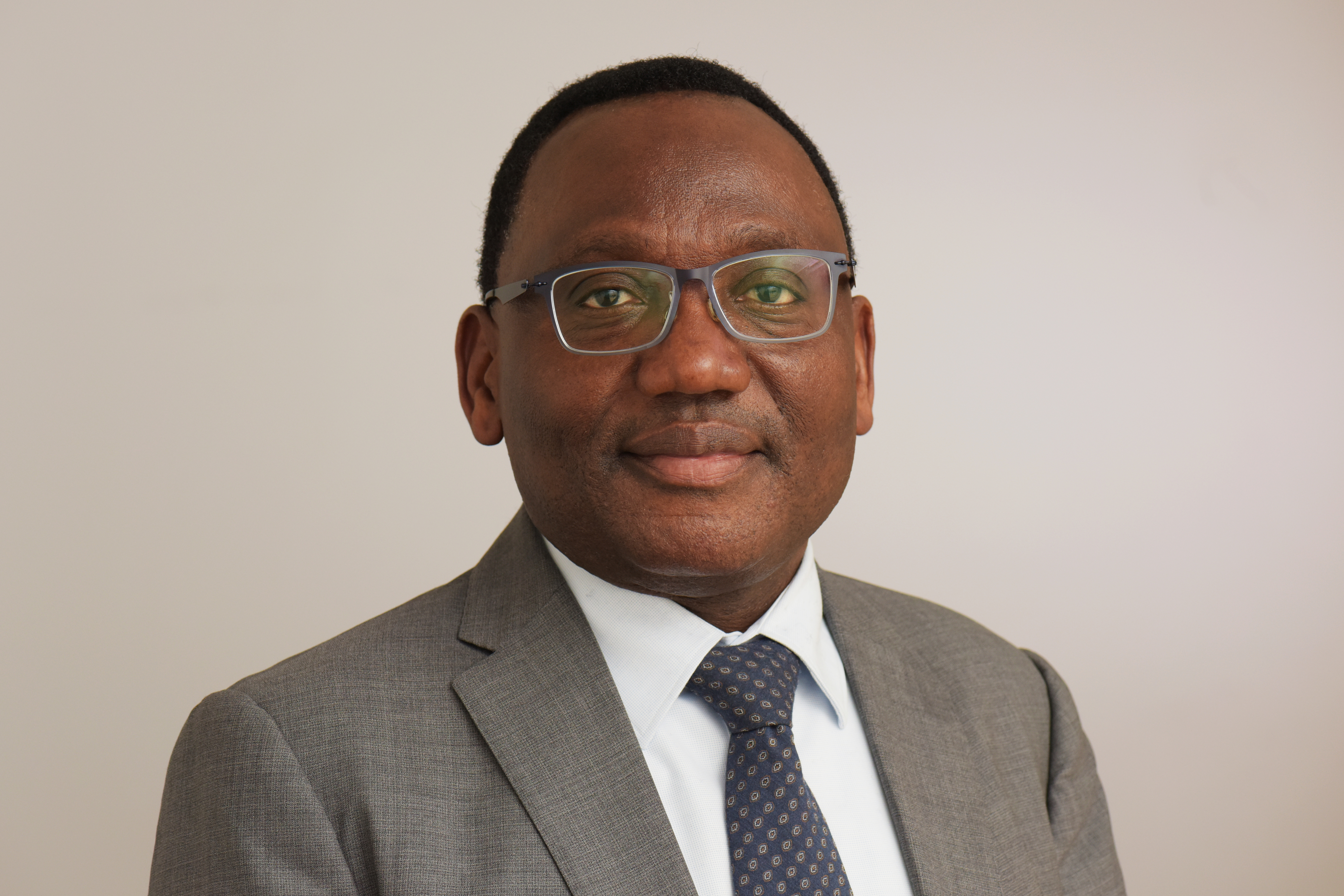
- Born: 1958 (age 67–68)
- Occupations: Agricultural & development economist
- Awards: AAEA Fellow, AAAE Fellow & IAAE Honorary Life Member

Awudu Abdulai (born 1958) is a Ghanaian agricultural and development economist, and professor at the Institute of Food Economics and Consumption Studies, University of Kiel, Germany. His research and teaching focus on issues related to poverty alleviation, food and nutrition security, consumer behavior, and sustainable agriculture.

== Education and career ==
Abdulai earned his BSc degree in agricultural economics from the Kwame Nkrumah University of Science and Technology, Kumasi, Ghana, and both his MSc and PhD degrees from the Swiss Federal Institute of Technology (ETH-Zurich) in 1990 and 1994, respectively. He received the prestigious Outstanding PhD Dissertation Award from ETH-Zurich in 1994.

After spending some time as a visiting scholar at Iowa State University in 1997–1998 and Yale University in 2002, Abdulai became an assistant professor for food economics at ETH-Zurich before moving to the University of Kiel in 2004, where he is currently professor of food economics and food policy and director of the Institute of Food Economics and Consumption Studies. He was the invited Cargill Visiting Professor at the Center on Food Security and the Environment at Stanford University from 2010–2011. He served as editor of Agricultural Economics from 2012 to 2022. He has also served as associate editor and editorial board member of many reputable journals, including the American Journal of Agricultural Economics and Food Policy.

In 2017, Abdulai became the chair of the Graduate Committee of the Faculty of Agriculture and Food Sciences at the University of Kiel. In 2021, he was appointed as a member of the Agricultural & Applied Economics Association (AAEA) Fellows Selection Committee for the five-year period from 2021–2026.

Abdulai has consulted for several international institutions, including the World Bank, Food and Agriculture Organization of the UN (FAO), World Food Program (WFP), International Food Policy Research Institute (IFPRI), International Livestock Research Institute (ILRI) and the Bank of Ghana.

== Awards ==
In 2006, Abdulai received the Teaching Excellence Award of the Faculty of Agricultural and Food Sciences at the University of Kiel. In 2015, he was awarded the African-German Network Association Annual Prize for Research and Development. Abdulai was inducted as Distinguished Fellow of the African Association of Agricultural Economists in 2010 and was the first black scholar to be named Fellow of the Agricultural & Applied Economics Association (AAEA) in 2020. He was also named an Honorary Life Member (Fellow) of the International Association of Agricultural Economists in 2021.

== Scholarly contributions ==
- Determinants of Non-Farm Earnings of Farm-Based Husbands and Wives in Northern Ghana (1999). American Journal of Agricultural Economics. With Chris Delgado Vol. 81, No. 1. pp. 117–130.
- Structural Adjustment and Efficiency of Rice Farmers in Northern Ghana (2000). Economic Development and Cultural Change. With Wallace Huffman Vol. 48, No. 3, pp. 503–521.
- Spatial Price Transmission and Asymmetry in the Ghanaian Maize Market (2000). Journal of Development Economics Vol. 63, No. 2, pp. 327–349.
- Does food aid really have disincentive effects? New evidence from markets and households in Sub-Saharan Africa (2005). World Development. With Barrett C.B. and J. Hoddinott. 2005. Vol. 33, No. 10, pp. 1689–1704.
- Land Tenure Arrangements and Investment in Land Improvement Measures: Theoretical and Empirical Analysis (2011). Journal of Development Economics. With V. Owusu and R. Goetz Vol. 96(1), pp. 66–78.
- Adoption and Impact of Soil and Water Conservation Technology: An Endogenous Switching Regression Application (2014). Land Economics. With Wallace Huffman Vol. 90, pp. 26–43.
- Impact of Ex-Ante Hypothetical Bias Mitigation Methods on Attribute Non-Attendance in Choice Experiments (2016). American Journal of Agricultural Economics. With Mohammed Bello Vol. 98(5), pp. 1486–1506.
- Social networks, adoption of improved variety and household welfare: Evidence from Ghana (2021). European Review of Agricultural Economics. With Abdul-Mumin Yazeed doi:10.1093/erae/jbab007.
