= Women in Nepal =

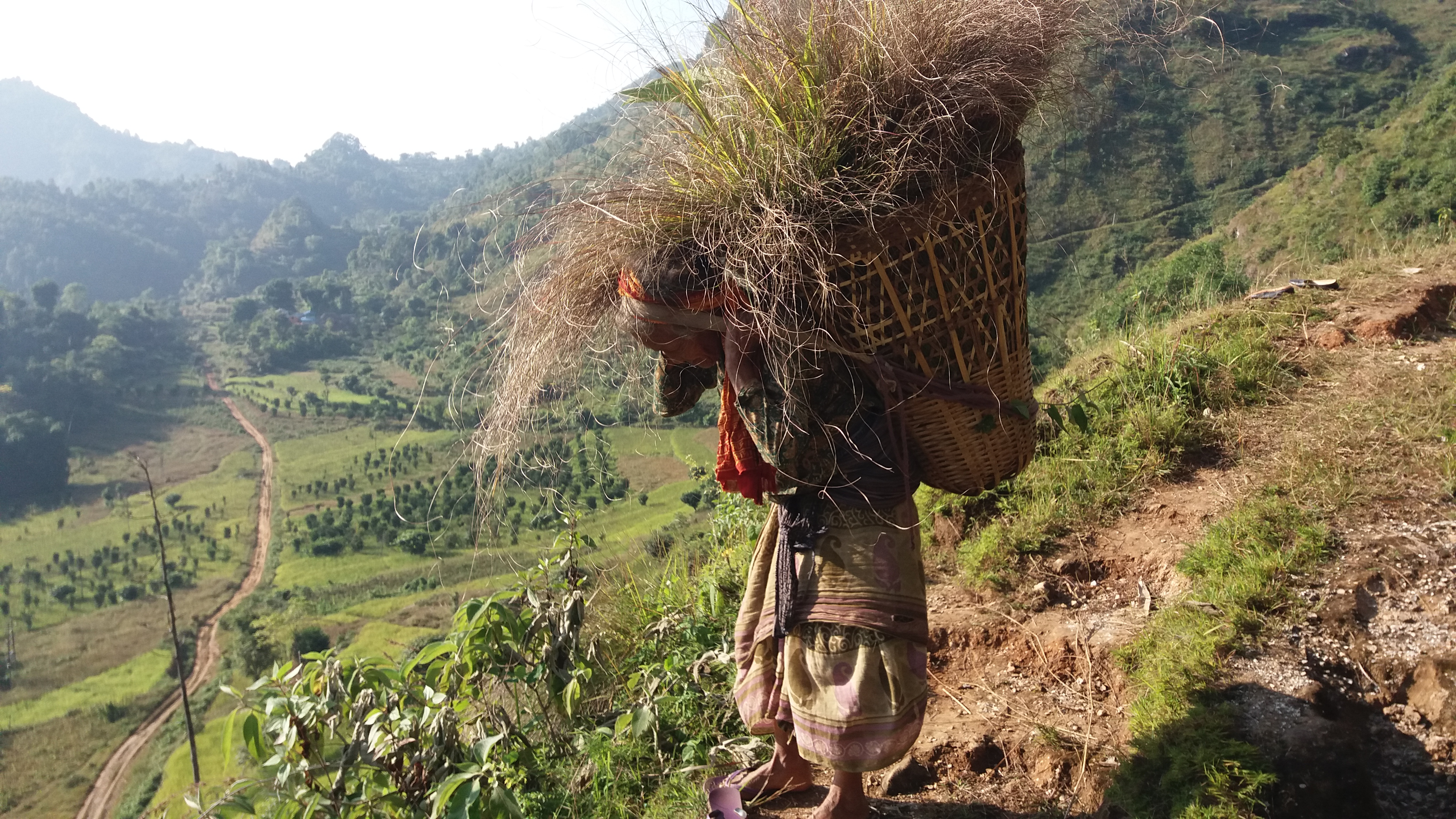

General statistics
- Maternal mortality (per 100,000): 170 (2010)
- Women in parliament: 33.2% (2012)
- Women over 25 with secondary education: 17.9% (2010)
- Women in labour force: 80.4% (2011)

Gender Inequality Index
- Value: 0.452 (2021)
- Rank: 113th out of 191

Global Gender Gap Index
- Value: 0.692 (2022)
- Rank: 96th out of 146

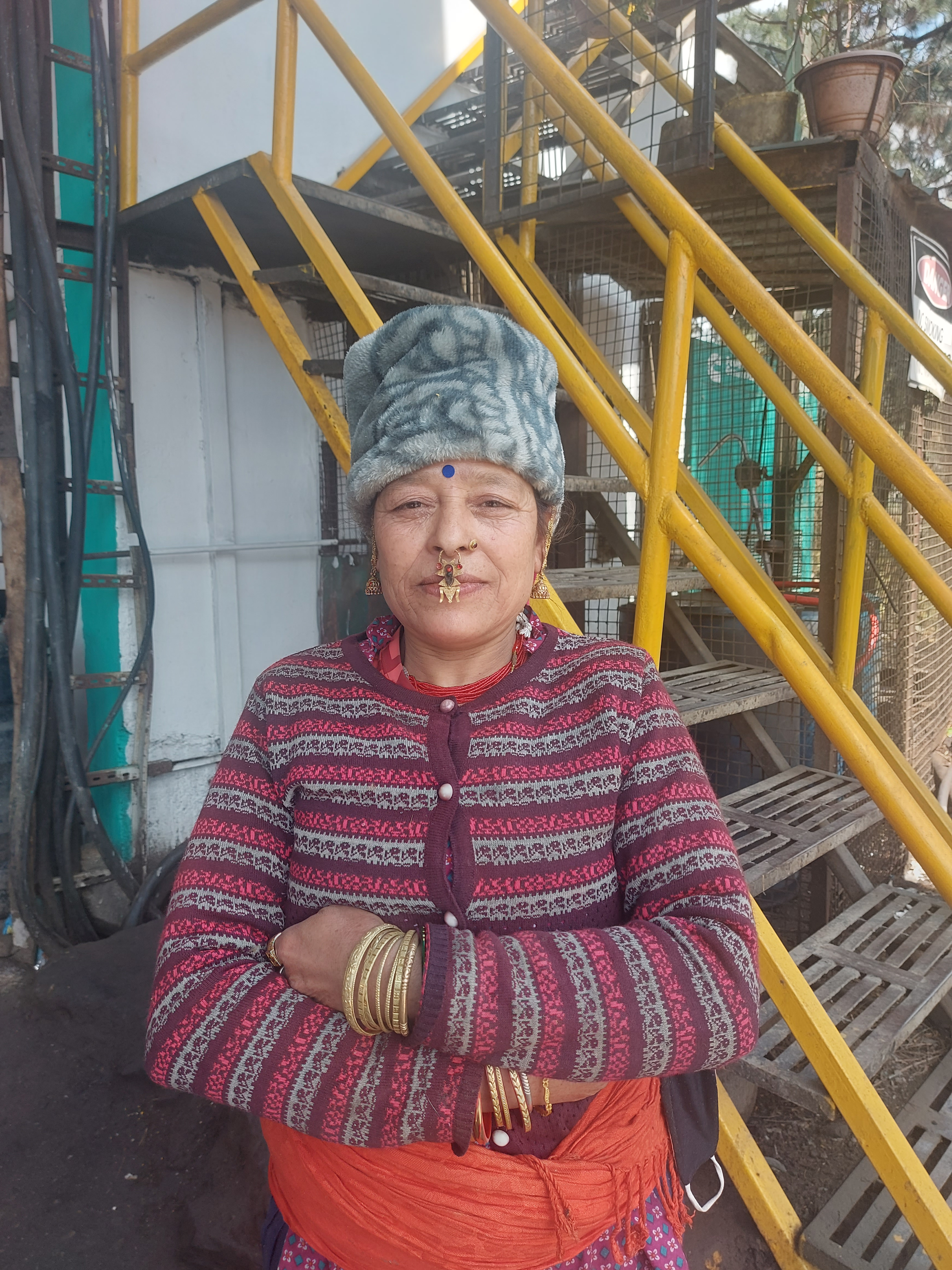
Nepali woman

The status of women in Nepal has varied throughout history. In the early 1990s, like in some other Asian countries, women in Nepal were generally subordinate to men in virtually every aspect of life. Historically, Nepal has been a predominantly patriarchal society where women are generally subordinate to men. Men were considered to be the leader of the family and superior to women. Also, social norms and values were biased in favor of men. This strong bias in favor of sons in society meant that daughters were discriminated against from birth and did not have equal opportunities to achieve all aspects of development. Daughters were deprived of many privileges, including rights, education, healthcare, parental property rights, social status, last rites of dead parents, and were thought to be other's property and liabilities. In the past century, there has been a dramatic positive change in the role and status of women in Nepal, reducing gender inequality. While the 1990 Constitution guaranteed fundamental rights to all citizens without discrimination on the basis of ethnicity, caste, religion, or sex, the modernization of society, along with increased education of the general population, have also played an important role in promoting gender equality. The roles of women have changed in various ways in the modern Nepalese society.

Despite the difficult post-conflict transitional context, today, Nepal is not only rapidly progressing towards economic development, it is also achieving targets for poverty and hunger, universal primary education, child mortality, maternal health and gender equality and women's empowerment. Women's representation in the Constituent Assembly has dramatically increased to 29% in the November 2013 elections from 2.9% in 1991 (in the then parliament). Women are now taking leadership roles and participating in decision making at all levels. There has been increased government involvement to increase accountability and monitoring of gender equality commitments and to establish and strengthen linkages between the normative and operational aspects of gender equality and women's empowerment. Today, Nepalese women are defying cultural traditions, and are becoming community leaders, environmentalists politicians and business owners. In October 2015, Nepal elected its first female president, Bidhya Devi Bhandari. Other famous Nepali women include CNN Hero of the Year winners Anuradha Koirala, Pushpa Basnet, first female to climb Mt. Everest Pasang Lamu Sherpa, international award-winning athletes Mira Rai, Phupu Lhamu Khatri, and the first female chief justice Sushila Karki.

Although roles and status of women in modern Nepalese society has undergone a massive transformation and their rights have been secured by the constitution, enforcement outside the few major cities has been a lax. Given that Nepalese society is heavily influenced from the Hindu system of beliefs emphasizing patrilineal descent and a patrifocal residence system, implementing certain aspects of these laws have been a challenge. The rugged, mountainous topography adds to this issue. In these remote places, gender disparity still exists, women have limited control, are restricted to household work, deprived of education, discriminated based on caste, and have poor healthcare access. Existing laws are inadequate to deal with sexual offenses and Nepal has no law to deal with sexual harassment. Nepalese women are more vulnerable to rape and domestic abuse, and young women risk being trafficked to the brothels of India. There exist also many superstitions and taboos related to caste and mensuration leading to unequal treatment of women. In these cases, they are not allowed to touch drinking water, have to live away from the house secluded, and cannot perform/attend religious activities, while menstruating.

== Law ==
The Constitution of the Kingdom of Nepal of 1990 contained a guarantee that no person should be discriminated against on the basis of sex, and, in 1991, the government ratified the Convention on the Elimination of All Forms of Discrimination against Women (CEDAW).

A 1975 amendment to the civil code introduced the first clear provision on property rights for women. It ruled that a woman who remained unmarried up to 35 years of age had a right to inherit property. In 2002, a bill was passed granting women the right to inherit property from birth, specifying however that at the time of marriage any property must be returned to the parent's family, with the wife obtaining equal right to her husband's property instead. The 2002 bill included also other provisions on women's rights, in particular granting a woman the right to divorce under certain conditions, a legalization of abortion, and increased punishments for rapists. The Interim Constitution 2063 of Nepal has some provisions to uplift the status of women. The constitution says that a daughter can get equal parental property as son if she asks, a woman can divorce her husband and get 50% of his property, a child can acquire citizenship in the name of his/her mother, in every governmental office a 20% quota for female must be preserved, and 33% of seats are preserved in parliament for women. These efforts are done so that women can be in the mainstream politics of the country and be socially and economically strong.

Nepal outlawed marital rape in 2006.

In February 2021, In an effort to combat sex trafficking, The Department of Immigration proposed a policy requiring women under 40 to have a letter and permission from family to travel abroad. Human right advocates believe the proposal discriminates based on gender and age. Those critical of the policy believe it would force women into undocumented employment, actually increasing the risk of trafficking and abuse.

== Gender roles ==
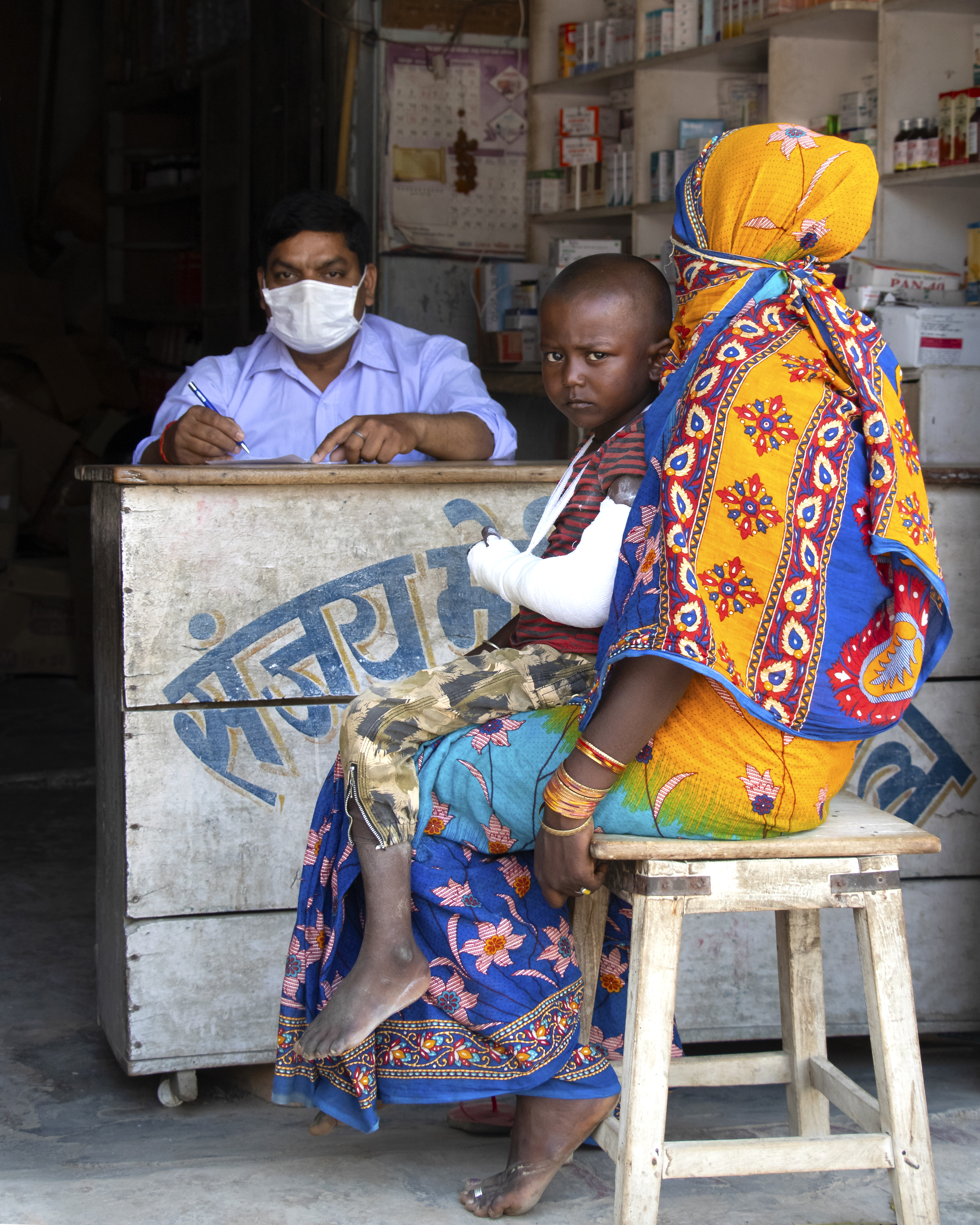
A Nepali woman with her child at a medical shop in Rajbiraj

In Nepal, the historical gender roles, spaces and stereotypes of the ‘public’ male breadwinner (provider) and ‘private’ female care-giver are espoused even under changing situations. This is due to the association of household status with women's non-work that has been perpetuated by the circumstances of women having to offer their labor in the paid market work-spheres under extreme economic stress and poverty. Men are predominantly the ones who interact with the outside world while women's major sphere of operation is within the households. It is said that Nepali girls and women work for more than boys and men, spending 25 percent to 50 percent more time on households tasks, economic and agricultural activities. Yet, due to the nature of their work which is intertwined with household activities at times and is often unpaid, on the one hand, and the flawed definition of economic activity, on the other hand, women's economic participation remains statistically invisible. The role played by women in the care sector, predominantly their reproductive work, bearing, rearing, nurturing children and household maintenance are activities that fall outside the national accounting systems. While these activities are crucial for household members well-being and effective participation in different spheres – economic, social and political, they continue to remain non-economic activities. By virtue of women performing these roles which are statistically not counted as economic and hence not monetarily valued, women's roles and their contribution is assigned low status.

In the Nepali context, the empowerment and development of women is inextricably bound to the dominant Hindu social structure, which influences all aspects of social, cultural, and economic life. This structure assigns women restricted roles, which most often involve household and family responsibilities. Nepali women have internalized this system and this makes it difficult for them to envision themselves in roles outside the home. Women also harm each other by passively accepting societal attitudes. In Nepal, women's words are thought to be only half true and are not treated seriously. Surprisingly, both men and women accept this societal attitude. Women cannot expect men to take them and their demands seriously if they themselves do not take each other seriously. Women's passive acceptance of their limited social status has resulted in the perpetuation of gender discrimination. Many women believe that this is the way it has always been and that this is the way it will always be. In the home, Nepali women are thought to be a source of life, but they are also compelled to slave away for male family members. Women are treated like seasonal workers and are sent away when they are no longer needed, often because they have failed to produce sons. Yet biology tell us gender is determined by the father's sperm. Social attitudes will not change as long as women believe them to be true and as long as parents choose to raise their children in homes in which gender discrimination is the norm.

In some ethnic groups and social classes, women's roles in the economy goes beyond the domestic sphere as when Thakali women are Involved In the hotel and catering business, or when educated Gurung women have positions in the private and public sectors or when women from laboring households and from the so-called occupational castes work as field laborers or porters for others. It has been noted that women in the more orthodox Hindu communities who are largely confined to domestic and subsistence production display a much less significant role in major household economy decision than those in the Tibeto-Bunnan communities where women participate actively in the market economy. Some of the daughters and sisters of the rich family have jobs such as school teachers, social workers and the like. Both boys and girls from the well-off families get chance to go to school. On the contrary, very few cases of school enrollment are found among the poor families. Because of reading and writing skills of the well-off families, the local level government and semi- government jobs fall in their hands. In the poor households, ploughing, roofing, climbing the trees to lop the fodder, threshing rice, sowing, making bamboo baskets and bamboo mattress, manufacturing agricultural implements, etc. are the major tasks of the males whereas transplanting millet and paddy, grinding maize and millet, husking and winnowing of crops, cooking rice and washing utensils are the female's works. Digging, wedding, harvesting and carrying load are common for both sexes. Mothers usually nurse the infants. Mothers have major role for infants' caring which is also supported by grandmother, sister or elder children.

== Dowry ==
In Nepal, the custom of dowry is still common, and dowry-related violence remains a problem, even though the dowry system has been banned in Nepal. Despite the laws, incidents of domestic violence related to dowry continue, under a general perception of impunity. The practice of dowry is closely related to social prestige; and dowry violence is especially prevalent in the Terai belt. In 2009, Nepal enacted the Social Customs and Practices Act outlawing dowry; however, there have been no known cases of enforcement.

In some communities, like the Newar people, the dowry system was meant as a gift that would assist the bride, in case she faced problems in the future. The dowry would be her wealth, that she was free to sell or use if she needed to start a nuclear family. So, the utensils and the money she received as dowry was to be kept separately under her own care until the time of need arrived. But with the growing influence of the other communities, under the caste system which is akin to the one followed in India Caste system in India, the system has started changing. And over the times, it has become a system that actually puts more pressure on the family of the bride to fulfill the expectations of the family of the groom. This in turn weakens the status of the woman in the family, instead of the original idea of strengthening it by providing her material support.

== Child marriage ==
Child marriage is common in Nepal. The practice of marrying young girls is often driven by poverty, but its prevalence varies across the country, depending on level of education, wealth, geographic location, religion, and ethnicity. These marriages lead to pregnancy and birth at young ages, which often result in health problems, such as uterine prolapse.

Aside from the issues that arise from the marriage itself, child widows are prevalent as well. These widows are seen as witches and bad luck. They are forced to repent for their sins and wear white for the rest of their lives. Remarrying, general pleasure in life, specific foods, family events, looking men in the eye, and even leaving home are off limits to widows. This is specifically seen as an issue for child widows because they essentially give up their lives. Although child marriage is a part of Hindu culture, and many people see no issue with the practice. Many of the child widows in Nepal suffer abuse and trauma during and after their marriages. The age differences between bride and groom are usually large.

Over 700 million women and girls in the world were married before the age of 18. The disparity between men and women is evident, with only 156 boys married between ages 15–18 compared with 720 million girls. Nepal makes the list of the top 10 countries with the highest rates of child marriage. The minimum legal age for marriage in Nepal is 20 years for both women and men. This age requirement is intended to prevent and regulate child marriage in Nepal. The National Civil (Code) Act, 2017 (2074) provides that both parties must have attained the age of 20 years for a marriage to be legally valid.

== Domestic violence ==
Nepalese cultural, social, and religious patterns repeatedly enforce the low social status of women, often leading to a destructive lifestyle between genders. This violent culture is most prevalent in the marital aspect of their society. Instead of being treated as equal members in the human race, Nepalese women are shamed as less than mere slaves to their husbands. They must never refuse their partner's requests, and in the case that they do disagree, the women are “punished”, until this behavior is corrected. This aspect of Nepalese culture generally acts as a stimulant for domestic exploitation. However, according to Nepalese law, a woman has experienced domestic abuse if, and only if, she has suffered from forced sexual intercourse. Unfortunately, more times than not neither the woman assaulted, nor the man doing the abusing will report the crime. To make matters worse, even when it is reported, any form of consequential punishment is seldom executed.

In 2009, a study was conducted to determine the association between selected risk factors and domestic violence of married women in Nepal, aged 15–24. Scientists were determined to solve this cycle of corruption before it spiraled out of control. The study concluded that approximately 51.9% of these women reported having experienced some form of violence in their lifetime, whether it be emotional, physical, or otherwise. In fact, 25.3% specified they had experienced physical violence, and a whopping 46.2% admitted they had been a victim to some form of sexual assault. These numbers not only shocked the research team, but started a chain reaction in the investigation of domestic violence in Nepal. According to a study by BMC Women's Health, logistic regression analysis found that the literacy status of Nepalese women, healthcare, age difference, and alcohol consumption had significant association with women's experience of sexual coercion in their marriage. The ProQuest Biological Science Collection also released a study, reporting that 21% of Nepalese men believe they are completely justified in physically abusing their spouse. In addition it showed that about 5% of these men find justification in using force to have sexual intercourse, and 3% that say they may rightfully commit adultery if their spouse is unwilling to have sexual intercourse at that specific time. Therefore, in order to solve the overwhelming issue of domestic violence in the country of Nepal, one must first address the husband's beliefs and cultural rituals. Men in Nepal desperately believe that it is morally right, and in some cases their civic duty, to discipline their wives in a physical manner. For the sake of the betterment of these women, the overall male belief system must be altered.

Scientists studying the social aspects of Nepal believe that the domestic violence prevalent in Nepal can be traced back to 1996. In this year the Nepalese people endured the People's War, and its effects were felt for years to come. Depression, anxiety, and general distrust swept the country. Prior to the war, little violence had been recorded in Nepal. This prevailing rampage may also be due to the fact that compared to the unmarried youth of Nepal, a much higher proportion of married youth reported violence at home. Marriage is the underlying issue. The standards and expectations of marriage, as the people of Nepal understand it, are all wrong. A Nepalese marriage can be more easily related to a master and slave relationship, than a to husband and wife. Western marriages have set the expectations that a marriage should be based on foundations of love and trust, but systems such as the dowry subvert this notion in Nepal.

Although a law was passed in 2009 called the Domestic Violence and Punishment Act 2066, it is rarely enforced or acknowledged. This law against sexual assault is so rarely executed that hardly any Nepalese women even know that it exists. Depending on the act committed, this law could send offenders to prison for up to six months. The outcome of these women's’ lives could be drastically positively influenced if they had a safe place to go and report the crimes committed against them. However, care needs to be shown not only after the act, but as a way to prevent the assault in the future. Equal attention needs to be given in encouraging inter-spousal communication from the start of the marriage, rather than condemning wrongful behavior later on.

Economic empowerment goes a long way in women's change of status in the society. Ironically, even as this has been evidenced by several examples, women who are educated and economically independent have also been subject to domestic violence. The cycle of abuse is perpetuated because the social construct forbids women from speaking out due to the fear of shame or stigma.

According to the census of 2011, the male literacy rate in Nepal was 71.1% whereas the female literacy rate was 46.7%. The approach of government programs and non-government projects on empowerment has provided some improvement in the scenario compared to the situation a few years back. The situation of women's education and employment in urban area is somewhat progressing but the condition is rural areas is still the same. As most women in Nepal are working as the unpaid labor force in the family and more than 76% of women are involved in agriculture, there is no recognition of their contribution to the economic advantages that the family gets in return. In Nepal only 19% of women have ownership of the fixed assets, whereas 25% of women are head of households. The government and the legal system in Nepal also reflect the patriarchal attitudes. Legally a daughter cannot claim the property of the father, and a woman is entitled to the husband's property. The data and the legal provisions also reflects that women don't have equal access to economic resources which restrict them to make decisions on the property and economy and leaving them behind in society.

The country's strategy 2013-2017 identifies women's inequality as the hindrance for development and thus this strategy addresses in the empowerment of women in social, political and government systems. With the first woman President, first woman Speaker of the House and first woman chief justice, there is some hope that people will see positive changes in terms of empowering women via education and economic access.

== Chhaupadi ==
Chhaupadi is a social practice that occurs in the western part of Nepal for Hindu women, which prohibits a woman from participating in normal family and social activities during menstruation. Women are considered impure during this time, and are kept out of the house and have to live in a shed. Although chhaupadi was outlawed by the Supreme Court of Nepal in 2005, the tradition is slow to change. After a woman died in a Chauppadi hut in 2016, the government passed a law imposing punishment against those forcing women into the tradition, entering into effect in August, 2018.

== Witch-hunts ==
Witch-hunts in Nepal are common, and are targeted especially against low-caste women. The main causes of witchcraft related violence include widespread belief in superstition, lack of education, lack of public awareness, illiteracy, caste system, male domination, and economic dependency of women on men. The victims of this form of violence are often beaten, tortured, publicly humiliated, and murdered. Sometimes, the family members of the accused are also assaulted. In 2010, Sarwa Dev Prasad Ojha, minister for women and social welfare, said, "Superstitions are deeply rooted in our society, and the belief in witchcraft is one of the worst forms of this."

== See also ==
- Gender inequality in Nepal
- Women's rights in Nepal
- Women in Asia
- LGBTQ rights in Nepal
