= Food Policy (journal) =

- Discipline: Food policy
- Language: English
- Edited by: Mario Mazzocchi; Christopher B. Barrett

Publication details
- History: 1975-present
- Publisher: Elsevier
- Frequency: Bimonthly
- Impact factor: 3.788 (2018)

Standard abbreviations
- ISO 4: Food Policy

Indexing
- ISSN: 0306-9192
- LCCN: 76641392
- OCLC no.: 265442592

Links
- Journal homepage; Online archive

Food Policy is a bimonthly peer-reviewed scientific journal covering food policy. It was established in 1975 and is published bimonthly by Elsevier. The editors-in-chief are Holly Wang (Purdue University) and Christopher B. Barrett (Cornell University). According to the Journal Citation Reports, the journal has a 2023 impact factor of 6.8. Past editors-in-chief include Mario Mazzocchi (University of Bologna), Marc Bellemare (University of Minnesota), Bhavani Shankar (University of Sheffield), Satoru Shimokawa (Waseda University) and Colin Poulton (SOAS, University of London)
