= Child Workers in Nepal =

Non-governmental organization

Child Workers in Nepal (CWIN) is a non-governmental organization working as an advocate for children's rights. CWIN supports street children, children subjected to child labour, children who are sexually exploited, and also those victimized by violence. The organization's objective is to protect the rights of children in Nepal. It was established in 1987 by a group of students at Tribhuvan University who, upon investigating the conditions of children living on the streets in Kathmandu, Nepal, recognized the need for advocacy in this area. As a "watchdog" in the field of child rights in Nepal, CWIN acts as a voice for the disadvantaged and exploited children. It does this by lobbying, campaigning, and pressuring the government to protect and promote children's rights, and to end exploitation, abuse and discrimination against children.

The CWIN philosophy of working with children is summed up in its motto: "For children, with children". It works with the Government of Nepal to develop child-friendly policies, even though the government fails to prevent the violation of children's rights. CWIN researches violations of children's rights and works to inform the government and other decision-making bodies. The organization has a National Resource and Information Centre, a source of information on children's rights. CWIN publishes monthly e-newsletters in English and Nepali, which are distributed worldwide. It also publishes reports, fact-sheets and other materials in audio-visual and print formats.

Advocacy and education has always been an important component of CWIN's work. It organizes lobbying campaigns, publishes advocacy material, and organizes training and community action in furtherance of children's rights. It runs classes for adolescent girls from impoverished areas on empowerment.

== Background ==
During the 1950s, the eradication of malaria in Nepal's Terai region led migrants from other parts of the country to move in and occupy land traditionally owned by the Tharu ethnic community. The Tharu community was not wealthy enough to protect their land. Since there was no tangible proof that they owned the land, they were displaced and used as laborers.

It was also during this time when the Kamlari system was put into place. Kamlari is defined as a contracted system in which young girls from poor families are sold into domestic slavery. The practice of Kamlari was applied with the families being used as farmers, having them do agricultural work, then evolved to mainly the women and children used for slavery. This system existed for many years in Nepal's history.

Brokers would travel to western Nepal to purchase daughters from their families to work in the Kamlari industry. These brokers usually had an agreement with the families. The deal was typical to provide the daughter with work and her wages would be sent to the family. There was an additional benefit for these poor families, as the bargain relieved them of one more child they would have to feed and provide for. Another part to the agreement was that the children were to be given an education, but this occasionally did not occur. Kamlari was often hidden from the public eye; even though it was conducted in daylight, people in the community were generally unaware of what was truly going on.

== Role of United Nations ==
The United Nations General Assembly fostered the Declaration of the Rights of the Child in 1959. The declaration demanded that every child had the right to education, shelter, good nutrition, health care, and protection. They came to the conclusion that after World War II there was a need to protect and advocate for children around the world. The war left children in danger. UNICEF (United Nations International Child Emergency Fund) was adopted to the UN in 1953 and began a campaign to help children suffering from yaws. Yaws is an easily curable disease, but some places around the world do not have access to penicillin which is the cure. UNICEF worked to provide children around the world with this vaccination.

In 1989, the UN adopted the Convention on the Rights of the Child. This international treaty was the most adapted human rights treaty in history. The Convention on the Rights of the Child changed the way children and children's rights were viewed in the public eye.

== Foundation of CWIN ==
CWIN originated when a group of Tribhuvan University students saw the need for advocacy for the children in Nepal. They were more specifically focused on the children's living and working conditions. Similarly to UNICEF, CWIN's mission is to protect children around the world from things that are out of their control, whether it be Kamlari practices or the spread of diseases.

The students founded CWIN on 1 January 1987. The founder-president was Gauri Pradhan. Since then, CWIN has grown from a small local group in Kathmandu to an organization that is recognized internationally.

=== Kathmandu ===
CWIN's initial research was a study of the conditions of street children in Kathmandu. This was the first of numerous academic research projects which CWIN has undertaken into various aspects of children's rights.

In 1989, CWIN began to provide practical support for street children in Kathmandu, by opening a "common room" where they could rest and get medical help, and finding school placings for some of them. In 1995, it established a center for street children and other children at risk in Pokhara. In 1994, CWIN opened Balika Home, a residential crisis-intervention center that provides support for female victims of labor exploitation, sexual abuse, trafficking, domestic violence, torture, and armed conflict. In 1999, it opened a support center at the main Kathmandu bus station for children migrating to the city.

CWIN also opened free telephone helplines for children in Kathmandu, Hetauda, Nepalgunj, Pokhara, and Biratnagar, to provide counseling and aid to suffering children. They also opened a hostel for school-aged children who have no roof over their head, or simply no parental support.

== Locations ==
CWIN is mainly based out of Kathmandu, where it was started. Although Kathmandu is where the organization has its central office and a multitude of support buildings, CWIN is present in 37 of the 75 districts in Nepal.

Eastern Region:

- Jhapa
- Morang
- Sunsari
- Khotang

Central Region:

- Ramechhap
- Sindhuli
- Chitawan
- Dhading
- Bhaktapur
- Lalitpur
- Kathmandu
- Nuwakot
- Makwanpur
- Sindhupalchok
- Dolakha
- Kavre
- Rautahat
- Bara
- Parsa

Western Region:

- Nawalparasi
- Baglung
- Palpa
- Kaski
- Parbat
- Arghankhanchi
- Kapilbastu

Mid-western Region:

- Surkhet
- Banke
- Mugu
- Dailekh
- Jajarkot
- Rolpa
- Rukum
- Salyan
- Dang

Far-western Region:

- Kanchanpur
- Kailali
- Achham

== Accomplishments ==
1987:

The first important work that CWIN did was to translate the draft of UN Convention on the Rights of the Child into Nepali. The translation of the document allowed the Nepali people to educate themselves regarding children's rights. During this time, CWIN also published a magazine called Voice of Child Workers, the first ever child advocacy magazine in Nepal.

1988:

CWIN organised the first South Asian Seminar-Workshop on Working Children. This provided an opportunity to discuss issues like child servitude and other urgent, child-related issues at the regional level. The workshop was beneficial in expanding the reach of CWIN. The organization also began a non-formal education program, providing learning opportunities for street children. CWIN registered at the Cottage Industry Board as a non-profit organisation.

1989:

CWIN's informal education program was developed into the Street Children Support and Socialization Program. The "Common Room" was created out of demand for a space for children living in Kathmandu who needed a safe spot for medical support, rest, or simply a safe place to be. In addition, CWIN found schools for some of these children to be placed in.

1990:

CWIN's leaders were arrested when taking part in the People's Movement in 1990 and were later exiled. Despite this, they continued their research which was later published as: "Child Workers in the Stone Quarries" and "Lost Childhood: survey study on the street children of Kathmandu".

1991:

This was a busy year for CWIN. It began a national election campaign for child rights. The campaign did not favor any political party; instead representing a broad commitment to better the rights of children. With this campaign, CWIN made 20 recommendations regarding children's issues for the discussion of a new constitution in Nepal. CWIN was officially registered under the Social Service National Coordination Council as a child's rights and advocacy organisation. CWIN continued their research with two projects: "Child Workers in Tea Estates of Nepal" and "Trafficking in Girls in Nepal; Realities and Challenges".

1992:

Through CWIN's efforts, Nepali government ratified an act prohibiting child labor with the goal of eliminating child labor in Nepal. CWIN published three more published research papers: "Misery Behind the Looms: child labor in carpet factories in Nepal", "A Survey Study on Child Workers in Brick Kilns of Kathmandu", and "Voices form Tea Shops".

1993:

CWIN organised a major study course of children at risk, such as street children, those working in different sectors (especially the carpet industry), young victims of trafficking prostitution, and children in debt bondage. It organized three other groups to promote advocacy of children's rights: Volunteer Community Initiative, Children at Risk Networking Group, and Women Defend Pressure Group.

The organisation published two research documents: "Bonded Child Labor: Slavery exists in the Kamalya System and Child Workers in Listi, Sindhupalchowk" and "Trafficking in Young Women, Mahankal Village, Sindhupalchowk; a brief study on Untouchable Sarki Children in Naikap Bhanjyang".

1994:

CWIN opened the CWIN children's home, a transit center for children at risk: CWIN Balika. This program helped young girls reintegrate themselves back into the community. CWIN provided them a temporary housing and other services.

1995:

Assisting young women coming out of laboring, CWIN established the Self-Reliance Center. The center offered job skill training and placement support. CWIN submitted a document regarding the elimination of child labor to Prime Minister Man Mohan Adhikari. The Prime Minister then submitted a report regarding a possible solution to the issue of child labor. CWIN also conducted three other case studies: "Children at Risk in Pokhara", "Situation and problems of Tempo Conductor Boys in Kathmandu", and "Child Marriage in Nepal".

1996:

CWIN acted together with the government and other organizations to rescue 142 Nepali girls from brothels in Mumbai and return them to their families. Along with this, CWIN worked to organize the South Asian March against Child Servitude to further advocate for children going through harsh realities.

1997:

CWIN advised and provided input to the first Child Labour Act in Nepal. They also researched "children working as conductors in temps (three wheeler public vehicle".

1998:

CWIN officially became the regional coordinator for South Asia of the Global March Against Child Labor, greatly expanding their influence. They created a helpline program, which provided services to children at risk such as an ambulance service, therapy, medical and legal advice, and emergency shelters for those trying to escape child labor.

CWIN created Sunrise Hostel for children who need shelter and parental care, and also created their website. To further their advocacy for children's well-being, the CWIN Local Action Program was created to bringing education regarding the harms of drugs and alcohol use.

1999:

CWIN opened a contact centre in Kathmandu city, right outside the bus terminal, for children migrating into the city for laboring jobs based on their research, "Far Away from Home". They had identified a need for shelter for these children who were alone and were headed for laboring jobs in the city. Becoming aware of pedophilia and child sex tourism in Nepal, CWIN cooperated with the police to take down a foreign officer who was sexually abusing children and hiding it under a child care home.

2000–Present:

Since 2000, CWIN has been recognized by UNICEF as a huge advocacy leader when it comes to caring about children's rights. Children have been brought home to their families and have escaped their abuse.

== Civil war ==
During the civil war from 1996 to 2006, 328 children (232 boys and 93 girls) were killed, and 250 children (167 boys and 83 girls) were seriously injured. The civil society raised a strong voice against violence, but the series of child killings and violence against children did not stop. CWIN, during this period, tried to make everyone aware, using the slogan "Children are Zones of Peace". CWIN ran training sessions and published advocacy material. They also provided training for peace workers in different parts of the country, to promote the "Children are Zones of Peace" campaign.
