= Lac de Viry-Châtillon =

Lake in Essonne department, France

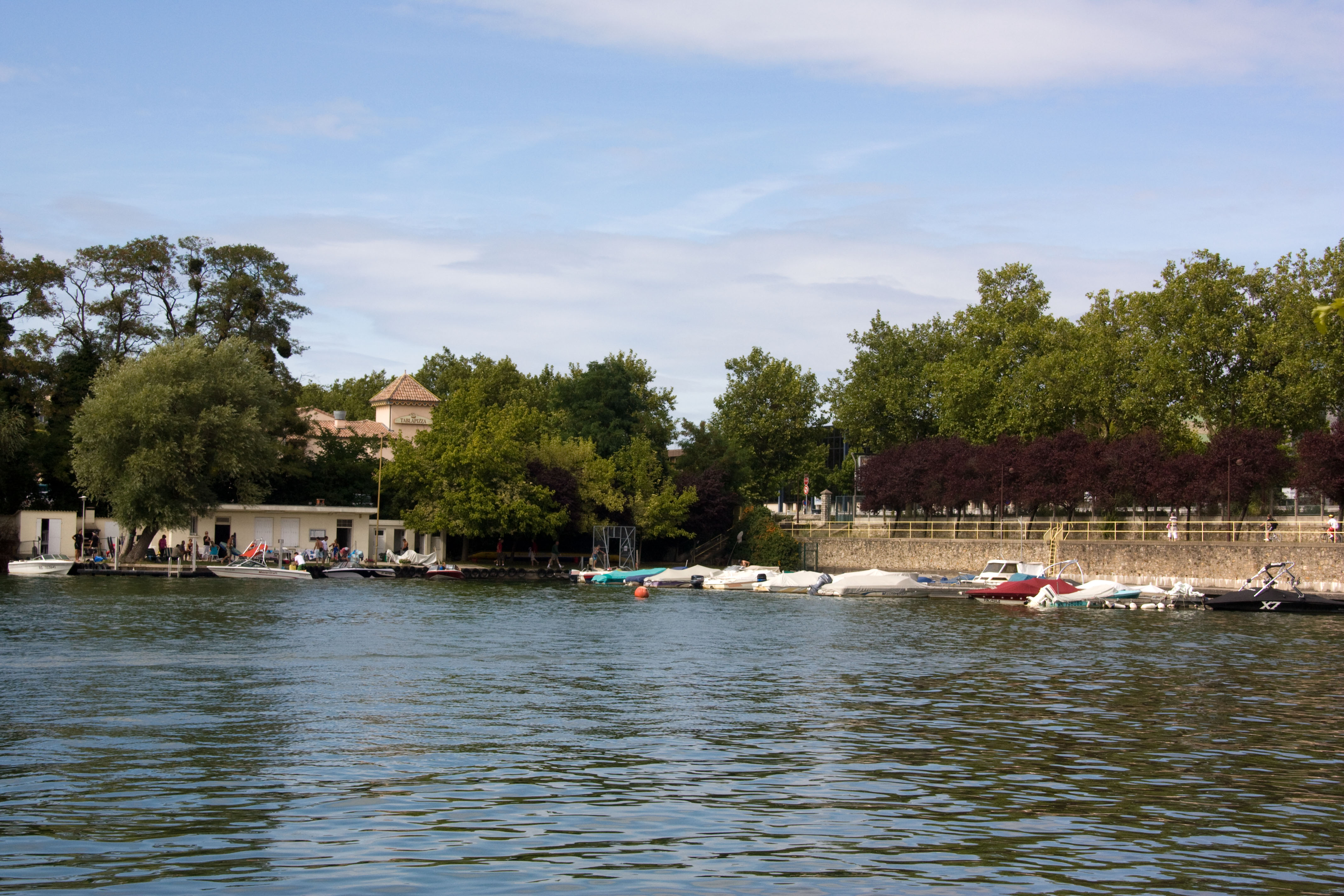

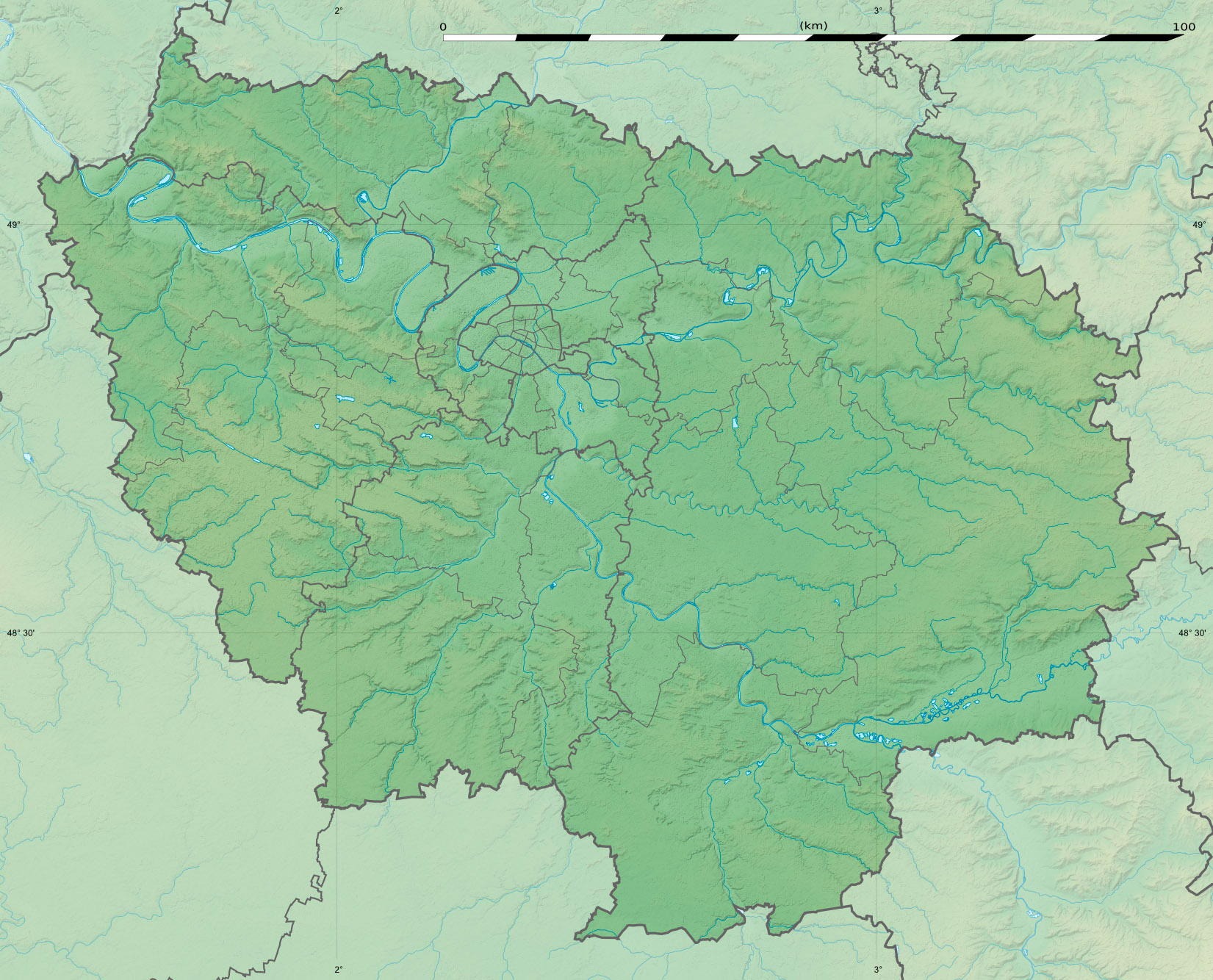
- Location within Île-de-France (region)
- Location: Essonne
- Coordinates: 48.6666°N 2.3896°E
- Basin countries: France
- Surface area: 0.77 km^{2} (0.30 sq mi)

Lac de Viry-Châtillon is a lake located in the municipalities of Viry-Châtillon and Grigny in the Essonne department, France. The lake consists of five basins: étang des Nouées de Seine, étang de la Justice, étang de la Place Verte, étang de la Plaine Basse and étang de l'Arbalète.
