= 2019 Saarland local elections =

Local elections in Germany

- 26 May 2019

207 district council seats 1,743 municipal council seats
- Turnout: 512,717 (63.58%) ▲11.09% 512,070 (63.71%) ▲11.18%
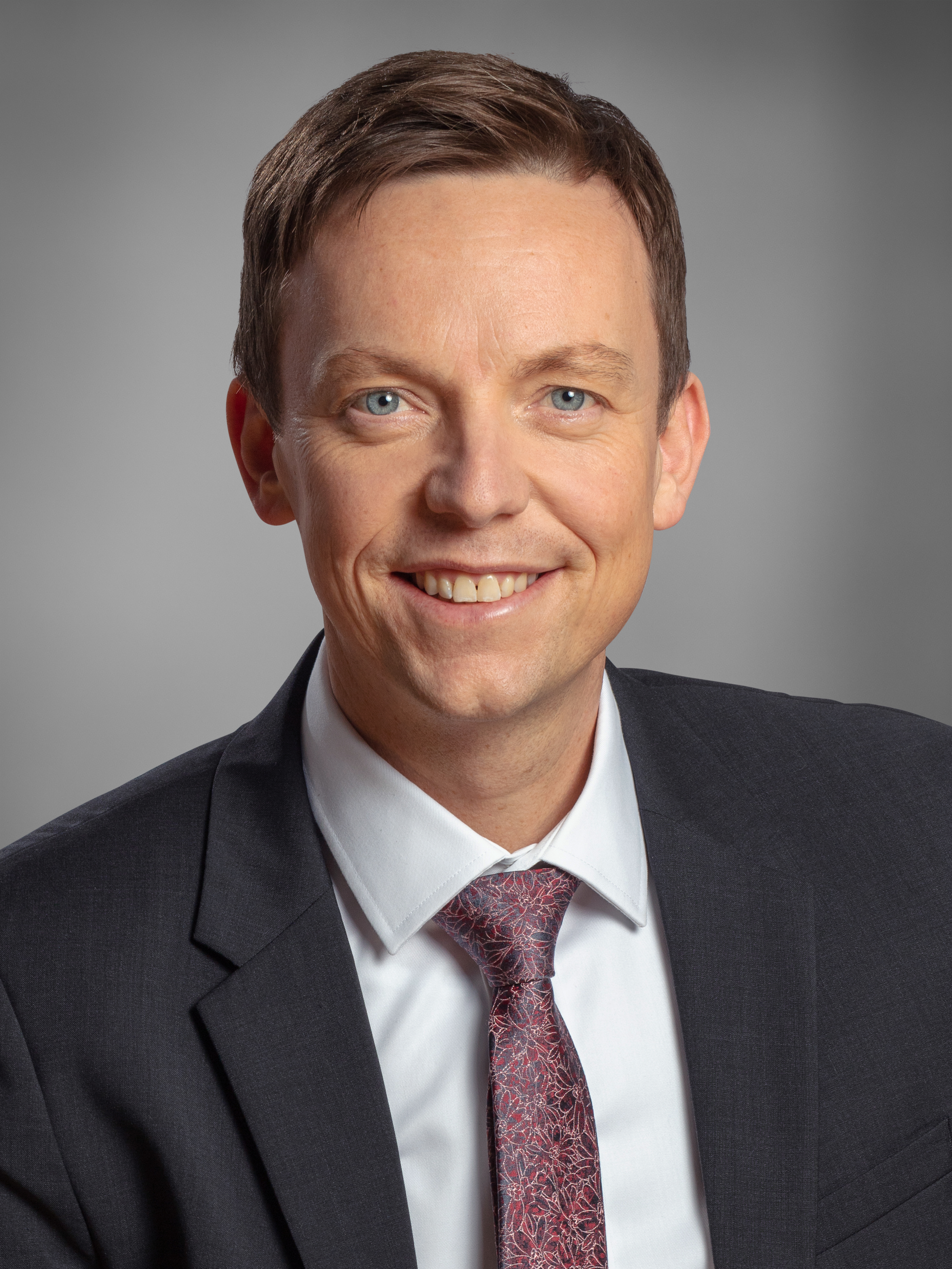

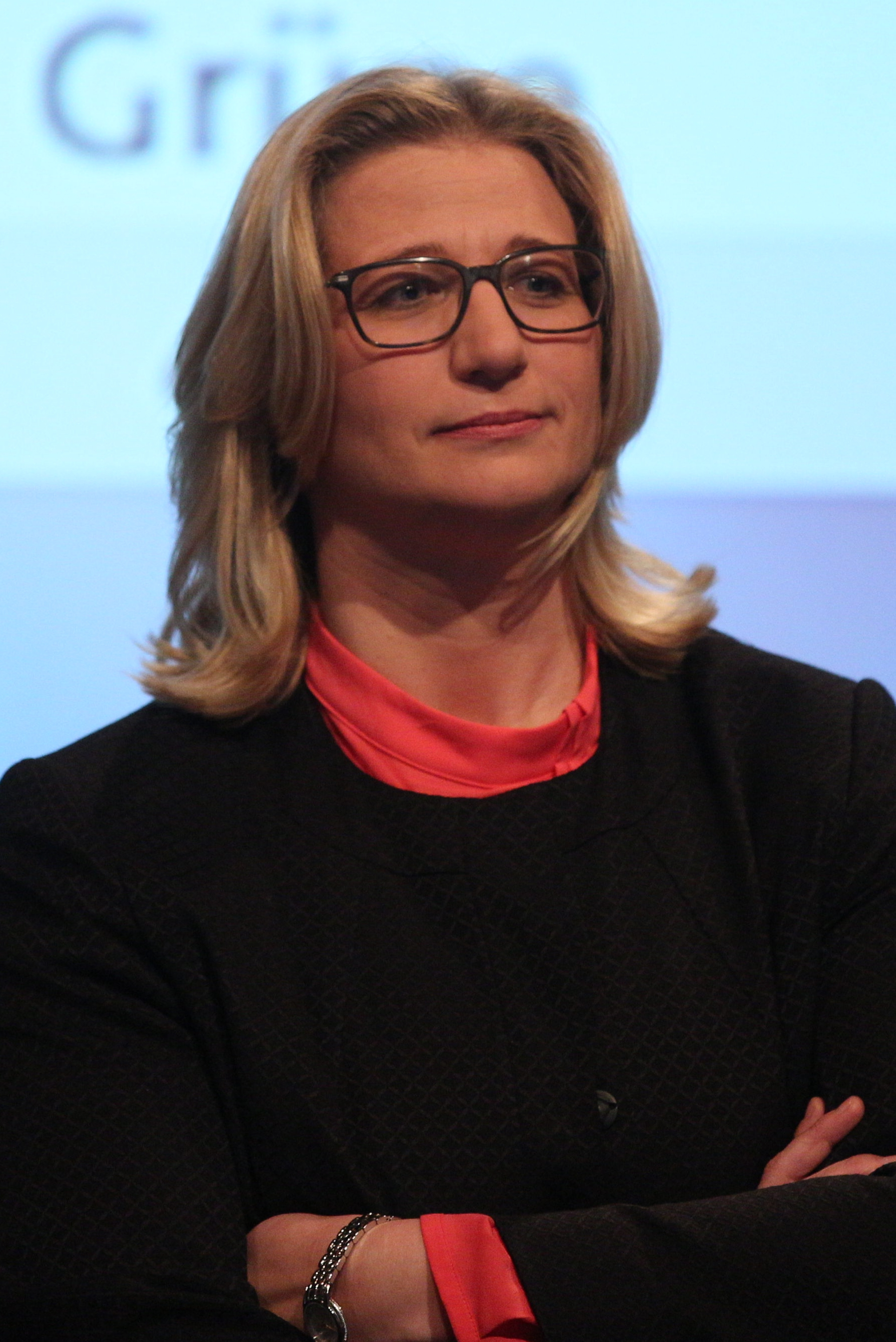

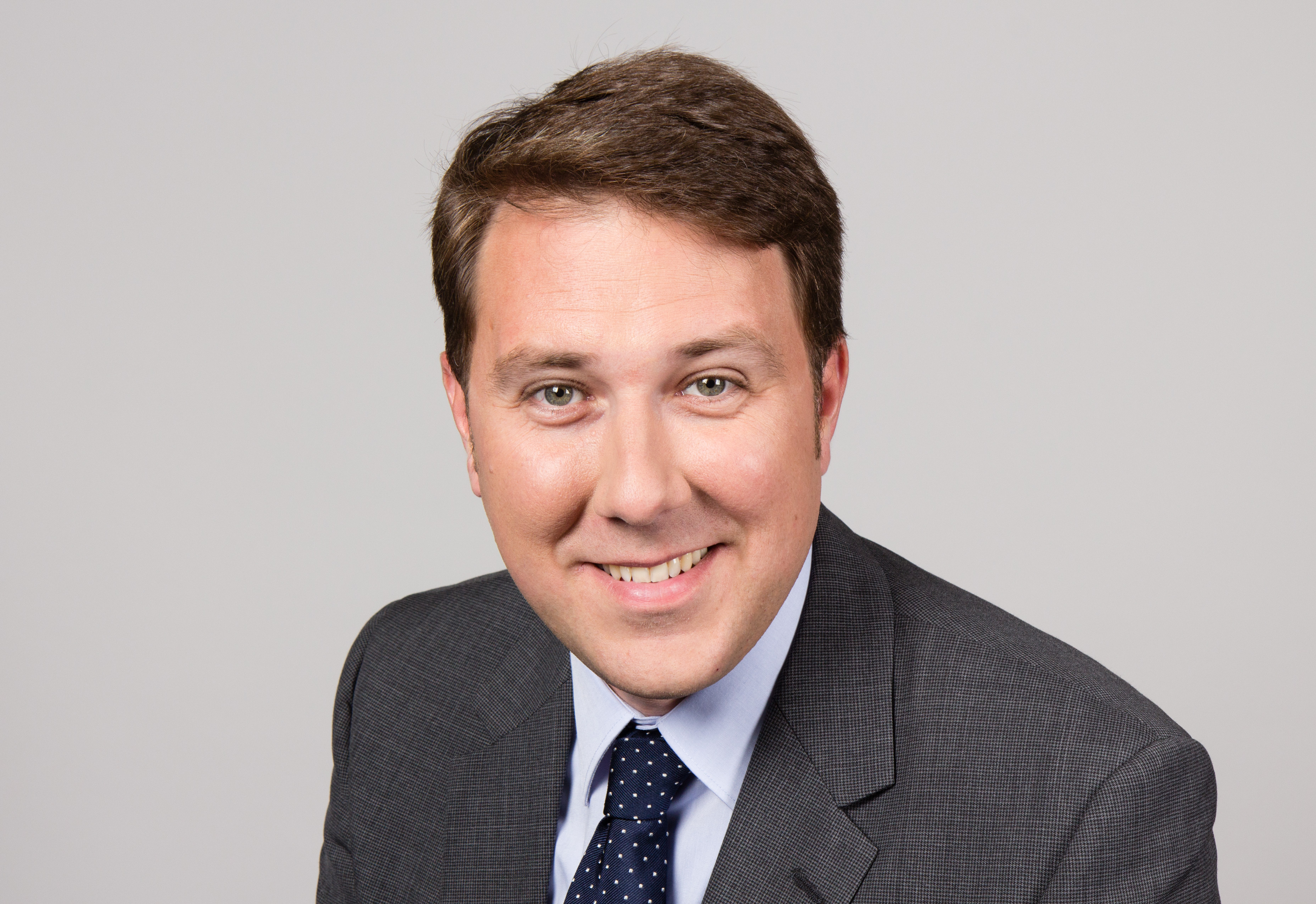

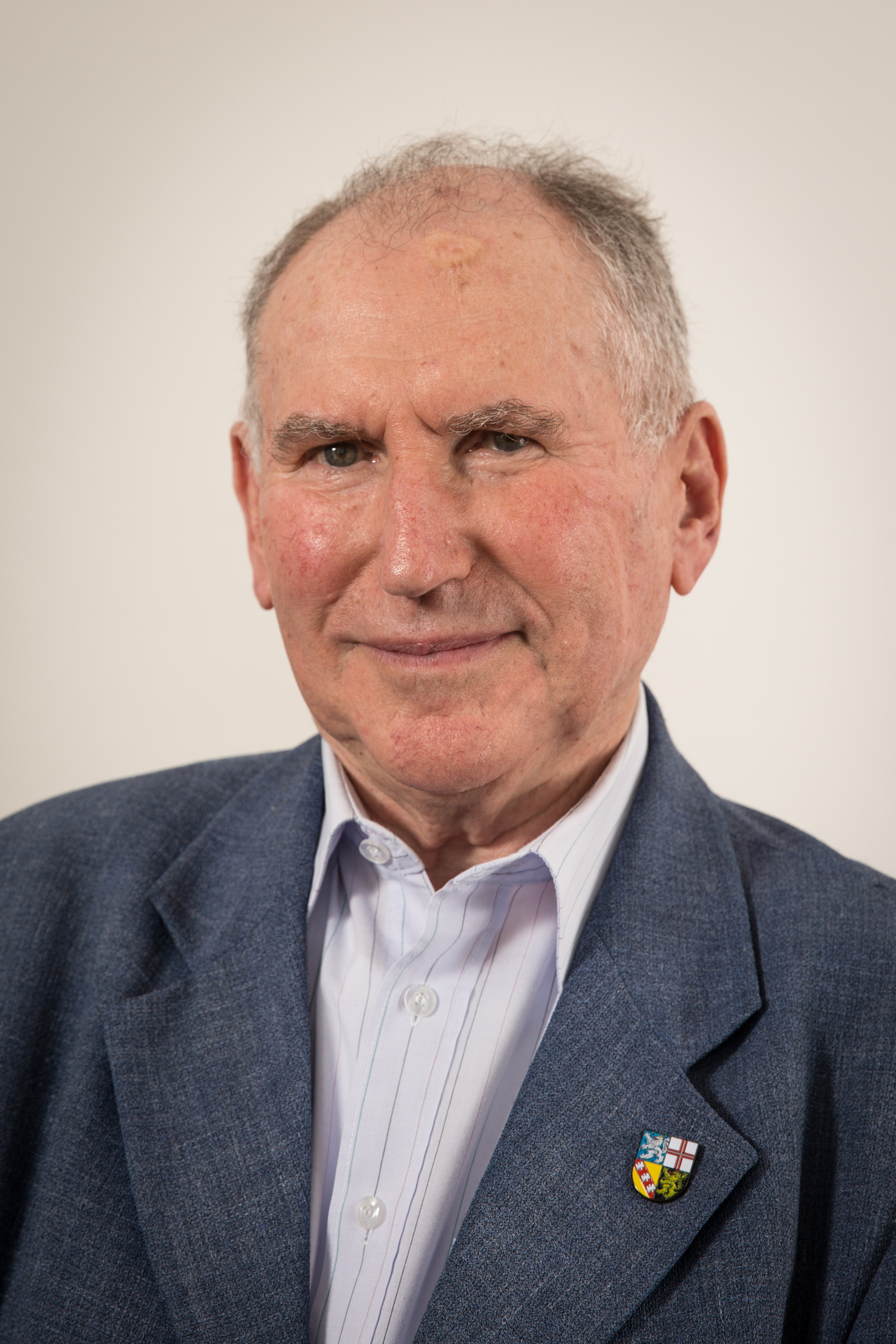

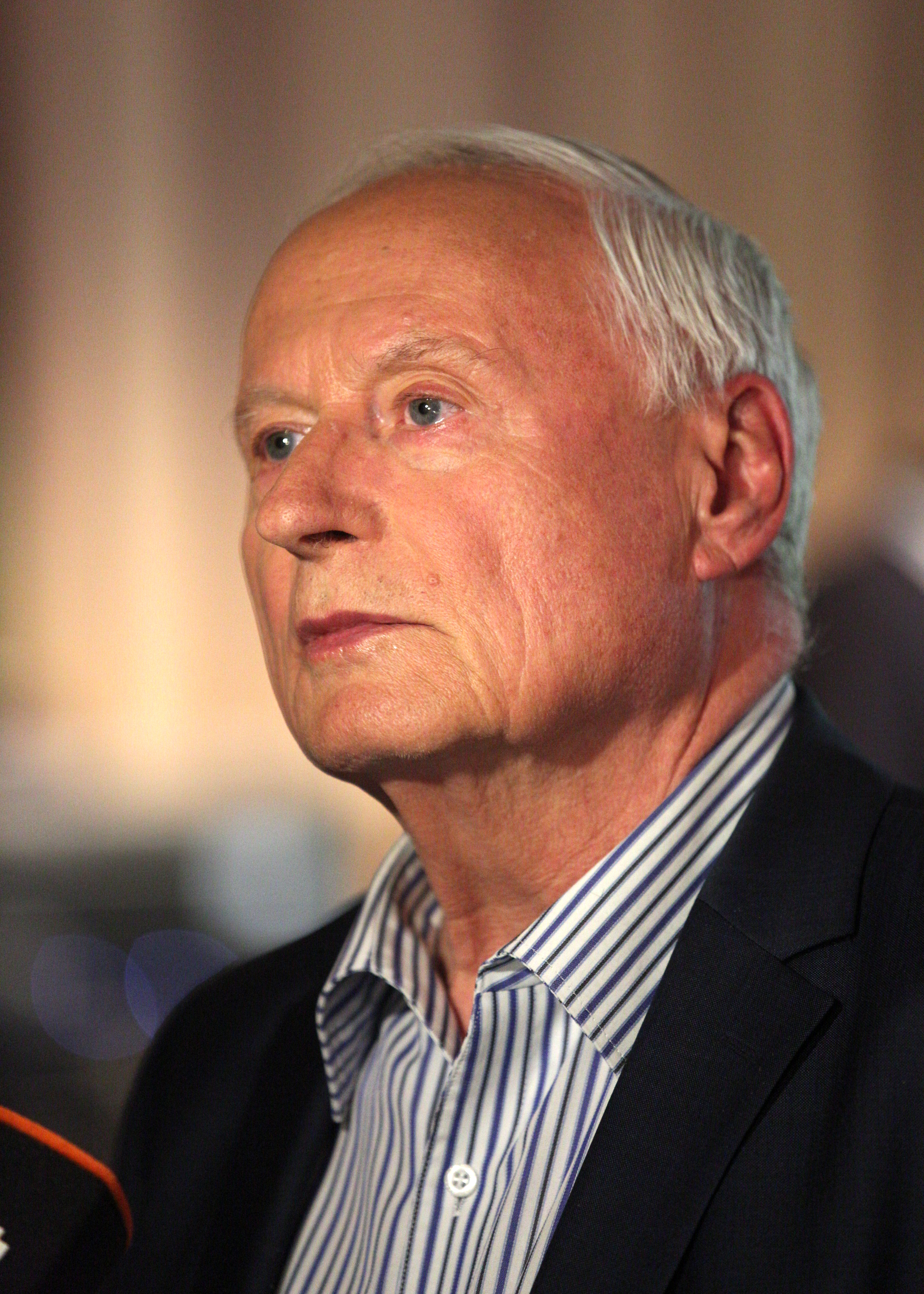

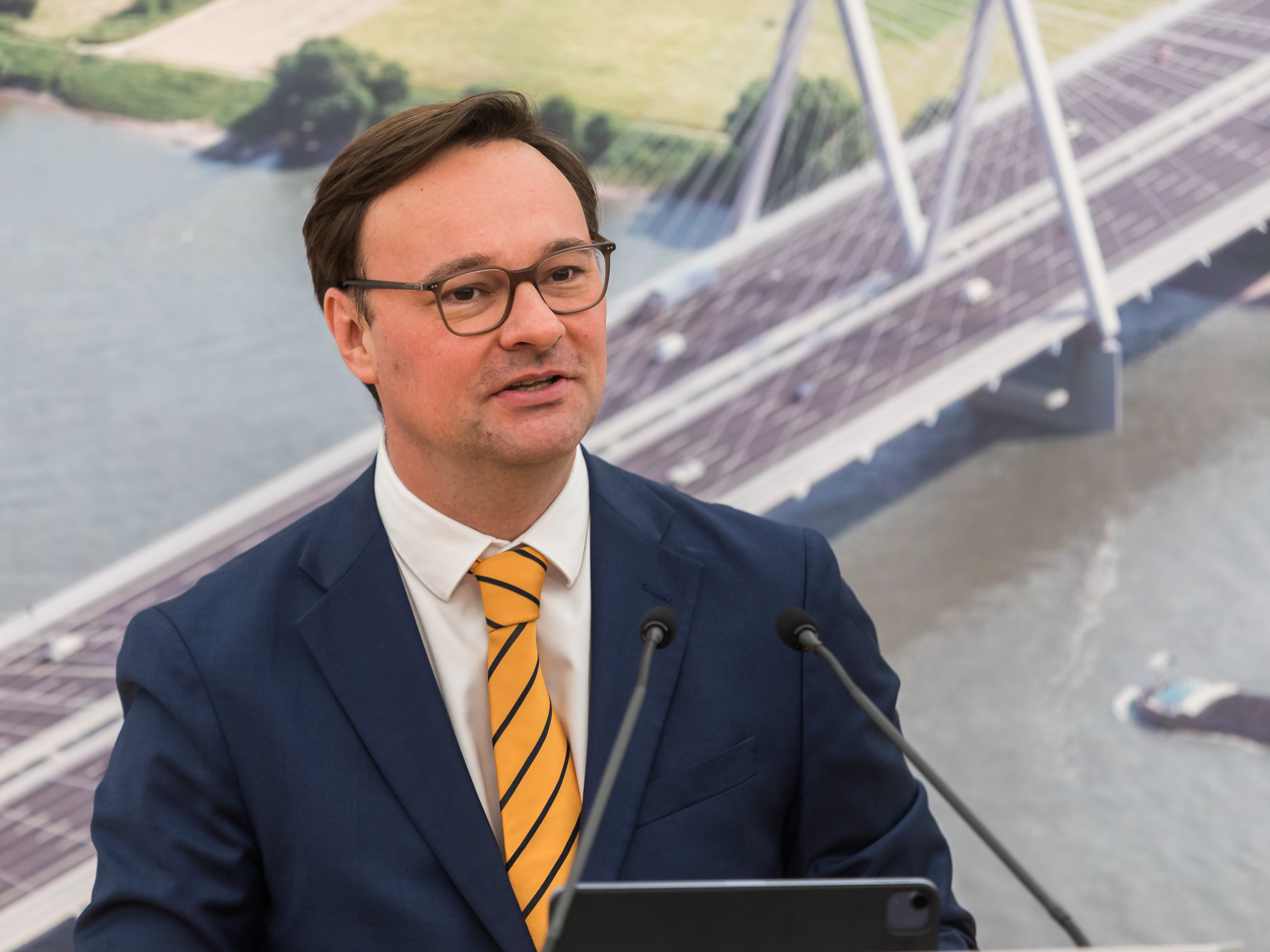
	First party	Second party	Third party
Leader	Tobias Hans	Anke Rehlinger	Markus Tressel & Tina Schöpfer
Party	CDU	SPD	Greens
Last election	87 seats, 38.32% 745 seats, 38.76%	77 seats, 34.71% 683 seats, 36.06%	10 seats, 6.13% 72 seats, 5.61%
Seats won	76; 689	65; 591	28; 160
Seat change	▼11 ▼56	▼12 ▼92	▲18 ▲88
Popular vote	170,385; 177,089	150,395; 154,908	63,083; 55,189
Percentage	34.02% 35.38%	30.03% 30.94%	12.60% 11.02%
Swing	▼4.30% ▼3.38%	▼4.68% ▼5.12%	▲6.47% ▲5.41%
	Fourth party	Fifth party	Sixth party
Leader	Josef Dörr	Oskar Lafontaine (Note: Between February 2018 and September 2019, the post of chairman of Die Linke Saarland was vacant. Oskar Lafontaine was the leader of the Die Linke faction in the Landtag of Saarland, making him the de facto leader of the party at the time of the 2019 municipal elections)	Oliver Luksic
Party	AfD	Linke	FDP
Last election	9 seats, 5.35% 21 seats, 2.04%	14 seats, 7.30% 106 seats, 7.30%	2 seats, 2.45% 27 seats, 2.65%
Seats won	16; 66	13; 95	6; 53
Seat change	▲7 ▲45	▼1 ▼11	▲4 ▲26
Popular vote	42,834; 24,785	37,452; 32,446	21,264; 19,917
Percentage	8.55% 4.95%	7.48% 6.48%	4.25% 3.98%
Swing	▲3.20% ▲2.91%	▲0.18% ▼0.82%	▲1.80% ▲1.33%

The 2019 Saarland local elections were held on May 26, 2019 to elect members of Saarland's 6 district councils and 52 municipal councils. Voters also elected the state's 34 directly-elected mayors. The elections were held on the same day as the 2019 European Parliament election in Germany.

== Results ==
Both of Germany's two historically dominant political parties, Christian Democratic Union and Social Democratic Party, lost seats in the election. Conversely, the parties with the strongest gains were The Greens, Alternative for Germany (AfD), and the Free Democratic Party (FDP).

Summary of results for the 2019 Saarland local elections
Party	Votes (District)	%	+/-	Seats	+/-	Votes (Municipal)	%	+/-	Seats	+/-
Christian Democratic Union (CDU)	170,385	34.02	▼4.30	76	▼11	177,089	35.38	▼3.38	689	▼56
Social Democratic Party (SPD)	150,395	30.03	▼4.68	65	▼12	154,908	30.94	▼5.12	591	▼92
The Greens (Grüne)	63,083	12.60	▲6.47	28	▲18	55,189	11.02	▲5.41	160	▲88
Alternative for Germany (AfD)	42,834	8.55	▲3.20	16	▲7	24,785	4.95	▲2.91	66	▲45
Die Linke	37,452	7.48	▲0.18	13	▼1	32,446	6.48	▼0.82	95	▼11
Free Democratic Party (FDP)	21,264	4.25	▲1.80	6	▲4	19,917	3.98	▲1.33	53	▲26
Local voters' associations	4,844	0.97	▲0.32	1	0	30,494	6.09	▲0.61	84	▼8
Family Party	2,848	0.57	▼0.02	1	0	1,197	0.24	▼0.22	3	▼3
Pirate Party Germany	2,815	0.56	▼1.88	0	▼2	1,648	0.33	▼0.74	0	▼9
Free Voters (FW)	2,270	0.45	New	1	▲1	–	–	–	–	–
Ecological Democratic Party (ÖDP)	1,695	0.34	New	0	New	–	–	–	–	–
National Democratic Party (NPD)	910	0.18	▼0.71	0	▼1	369	0.07	▼0.38	0	▼2
Die PARTEI	–	–	–	–	–	2,250	0.45	New	2	New
Total	500,795	97.67	▲0.56	207	▲3	500,592	97.76	▲0.36	1743	▼21
Invalid votes	11,922	2.33	▼0.56			11,478	2.24	▼0.36		
Voter turnout	512,717	63.58	▲11.09			512,070	63.71	▲11.18		
Eligible voters	806,471					803,787				

=== Mayoral results ===
Voters also directly elected mayors in 34 cities. If no candidate obtained more than 50% of the vote, a run-off took place on June 9th. Below are the results for the three cities with Lord Mayors (Oberbürgermeister):

2019 Neunkirchen mayoral election
Party	Candidate	Votes (First round)	%	Votes (Second round)	%	+/-
Social Democratic Party (SPD)	Jörg Aumann	8,737	46.8	7,221	57.6	▲10.8
Christian Democratic Union (CDU)	Dirk Käsbach	5,312	27.5	5,321	42.4	▲14.9
The Greens	Tina Schöpfer	2,221	11.9			
Alternative for Germany	Christoph Schaufert	1,605	8.6			
Independent	Peter Habel	962	5.2			
Total		18,837	98.2	12,542	98.7	▲0.5
Invalid votes		388	1.8	159	1.3	▼0.5
Voter turnout		19,225	51.5	12,701	34.3	▼17.2
Eligible voters		36,955		37,062		

2019 Saarbrücken mayoral election
Party	Candidate	Votes (First round)	%	Votes (Second round)	%	+/-
Christian Democratic Union (CDU)	Uwe Conradt	21,342	29.0	22,703	50.3	▲21.3
Social Democratic Party (SPD)	Charlotte Britz	27,070	36.8	22,429	49.7	▲12.9
The Greens	Barbara Meyer-Gluche	10,578	14.4			
Die Linke	Markus Lein	5,075	6.9			
Alternative for Germany (AfD)	Laleh Hadjimohamadvali	3,316	4.5			
Free Democratic Party (FDP)	Gerald Kallenborn	2,975	4.0			
Die PARTEI	Michael Franke	2,715	3.7			
National Democratic Party of Germany (NPD)	Otfried Best	469	0.6			
Total		73,541	99.7	45,132	99.8	▲0.1
Invalid votes		997	1.3	570	1.2	▼0.1
Voter turnout		74,538	54.4	45,702	33.3	▼21.1
Eligible voters		136,949		137,071		

2019 Sankt Ingbert mayoral election
Party	Candidate	Votes (First round)	%	Votes (Second round)	%	+/-
Christian Democratic Union (CDU)	Ulli Meyer	8,022	41.40	8,794	55.27	▲13.87
Independent	Hans Wagner	8,086	41.73	7,118	44.73	▲3.00
Social Democratic Party (SPD)	Sven Meier	3,269	16.87			
Total		19,377		15,912		
Voter turnout			66.75		54.10	▼12.65
Eligible voters		29,634		29,650		
