= 2021 Bergams factory strike =

French labour strike

The 2021 Bergams factory strike was a strike at a Bergams factory, which produced frozen meals, in Grigny, Essonne. Represented by the General Confederation of Labor - Workers' Force, the workers began striking in mid-September 2021. The strike ended in the bankruptcy of the company.

== Background ==
The city of Grigny has one of the highest poverty rates in France, with the Observatoire des inégalités reporting that around 45% of the city's population lived under the poverty threshold in 2020. A Bergams factory, producing frozen meals for clients such as Air France, Starbucks, and Monoprix, is one of the major economic centres of the city. Around 300 people work at the factory, of which a majority are women and with over 30 different nationalities being represented.

== Strike ==
A new collective bargaining agreement was signed between the workers and the company in late 2020, during the COVID-19 pandemic in France, which include a number of measures including salary cuts and increased work hours in exchange for a guarantee that workers would keep their jobs. Some workers saw their schedules increase by as much as 7 hours a week and their monthly salaries cut by as much as 25%. 35 workers had refused to accept the offer and quit the factory. However, the agreement proved contentious, with workers claiming they had felt forced to sign the agreement under threat of the company shutting down the factory. As the French government loosened COVID-19 restrictions in 2021, and the number of orders the factory received returned to a more normal level, the workers began arguing for a return to pre-pandemic working conditions and pay. However, the company refused to re-negotiate.

On 13 September, the workers walked off the job, numbering almost 300. The strike had begun.

On 12 October, the striking workers held a protest in front of the prefecture in Évry-Courcouronnes, calling for the company to enter negotiations.

On 29 October, the company threatened to shut down the factory if the strike continued. On 12 November, the Évry commerce tribunal was due to begin considering formal liquidation of the factory. Philippe Rio, the mayor of Grigny, has called for the French government to intervene to prevent a liquidation. On 19 November, the commerce tribunal ruled to liquidate the factory.

== Reactions ==
Europe Ecology – The Greens spoke in support of the strike, saying that "we need to move out of the economic system that reduces labour, health, and the environment into simple variables to be adjusted in global competition between big business." Philippe Poutou, leader of the New Anticapitalist Party, visited the picked line on 6 October to support the strikers.
