= World Mayor =

Worldwide biennial award for mayors

World Mayor was a biennial award organized by the City Mayors Foundation since 2004. It intended to raise the profile of mayors worldwide, as well as honour those who have served their communities well and who have contributed to the well-being of cities, nationally and internationally. The organisers make it plain that the award has no connection with any city or organization and is run on strictly non-commercial lines. Helen Zille and Leopoldo Lopez discussed their 2008 nominations on the BBC World Service programme Outlook. The Guardian looked at contenders for the 2014 prize. The 2018 World Mayor Project was dedicated to women mayors. The 2020 World Mayor Project is dedicated to mayors who have made the relief of poverty one of their top priorities. The winner of the 2021 World Mayor Prize Ahmed Aboutaleb was presented with his award at a ceremony held in the Dutch Senate by its President Jan Anthonie Bruijn.

The 2023 World Mayor Prize was dedicated to Friendship between Cities, awarded to a mayor and city that have made outstanding contributions to friendship and cooperation between towns and cities at home and across borders

The 2025 World Mayor Prize was dedicated to 'Mayors Fighting Poverty' and run on the World Mayor 2025 and Women Mayors platforms. However, in September 2025 the organisers published that they had decided not to continue to award the prize due to the low number of public nominations.

The City Mayors Foundation commissions the trophy presented as the World Mayor Prize. The trophy was conceived by Tann vom Hove. It was designed by artist Manuel Ferrari and is handmade out of steel by the metalworker Kaspar Swankey.

== Notable recipients ==
Notable winners include (subsequent political offices): Edi Rama (Prime Minister of Albania), Dora Bakoyannis (Greek foreign minister) and Marcelo Ebrard (Mexican foreign minister), while runners-up (or top 10 finalists) have included Andrés Manuel López Obrador (President of Mexico), Job Cohen (Dutch Labour opposition leader), Joko Widodo (President of Indonesia), Gavin Newsom (Governor of California), Leopoldo López (Venezuelan opposition leader), Cory Booker (US Senator) and John Hickenlooper (US Senator and former Governor of Colorado).

Riace (Italy) mayor Domenico Lucano, who came third in the 2010 poll, was arrested in October 2018 on various immigration-related charges. The mayor of Gdańsk Paweł Adamowicz, who was assassinated in January 2019, had ranked ninth in the 2016 poll.

== City Mayors Foundation ==
The City Mayors Foundation, also known as City Mayors, is an international think tank dedicated to urban affairs. It has been active since 2003 and ran the biennial World Mayor Prize, as well as the CityMayors.com website. Unlike Eurocities and United Cities and Local Governments it is wholly independent of any city.

== Winners of the World Mayor Prize ==
| Year | Name | Mayor of | Reference |
|---|---|---|---|
| 2004 | Edi Rama | (Albania) Tirana | |
| 2005 | Dora Bakoyannis | (Greece) Athens | |
| 2006 | John So | (Australia) Melbourne | |
| 2008 | Helen Zille | (South Africa) Cape Town | |
| 2010 | Marcelo Ebrard | Mexico City | |
| 2012 | Iñaki Azkuna | (Spain) Bilbao | |
| 2014 | Naheed Nenshi | (Canada) Calgary | |
| 2016 | Bart Somers | (Belgium) Mechelen | |
| 2018 | Valeria Mancinelli | (Italy) Ancona | |
| 2021 | Ahmed Aboutaleb | (Netherlands) Rotterdam | |
| 2021 | Philippe Rio | (France) Grigny | |
| 2023 | Elke Kahr | (Austria) Graz | |
| 2025 | not awarded | | |

== Runners up (Commendations) ==
| Year | Name | Mayor of | Reference |
|---|---|---|---|
| 2004 | Andrés Manuel López Obrador, Hazel McCallion, Martin O’Malley, Gavin Newsom | Mexico City, (Canada) Mississauga, (United States) Baltimore, (United States) San Francisco | |
| 2005 | Hazel McCallion, Álvaro Arzú, Oscar Samson Rodriguez, Gavin Newsom | (Canada) Mississauga, Guatemala City, (Philippines) San Fernando, (United States) San Francisco | |
| 2006 | Job Cohen, Stephen Reed, Jejomar Binay, Michel Thiollière | (Netherlands) Amsterdam, (United States) Harrisburg, (Philippines) Makati, (France) St Etienne | |
| 2008 | Elmar Ledergerber, Leopoldo Eduardo López, Phil Gordon, Ulrich Maly | (Switzerland) Zürich, (Venezuela) Chacao, (United States) Phoenix, (Germany) Nürnberg | |
| 2010 | Mick Cornett, Domenico Lucano, Dianne Watts, Campbell Newman | (United States) Oklahoma City, (Italy) Riace, (Canada) Surrey, (Australia) Brisbane | |
| 2012 | Lisa Scaffidi, Joko Widodo, Régis Labeaume, John F Cook | (Australia) Perth, (Indonesia) Surakarta, (Canada) Québec City, (United States) El Paso | |
| 2014 | Daniël Termont, Tri Rismaharini, Carlos Ocariz, Jed Patrick Mabilog | (Belgium) Ghent, (Indonesia) Surabaya, (Venezuela) Sucre, (Philippines) Iloilo City | |
| 2016 | Wolfgang Müller, Georgios Kaminis, Giusi Nicolini, Richard Arnold | (Germany) Lahr, (Greece) Athens, (Italy) Lampedusa, (Germany) Schwäbisch Gmünd | |
| 2018 | Ros Jones, Nathalie Appéré, Charlotte Britz, Beng Climaco | (United Kingdom) Doncaster, (France) Rennes, (Germany) Saarbrücken, (Philippines) Zamboanga City | |
