= Philippe Rio =

French communist politician (born 1974)

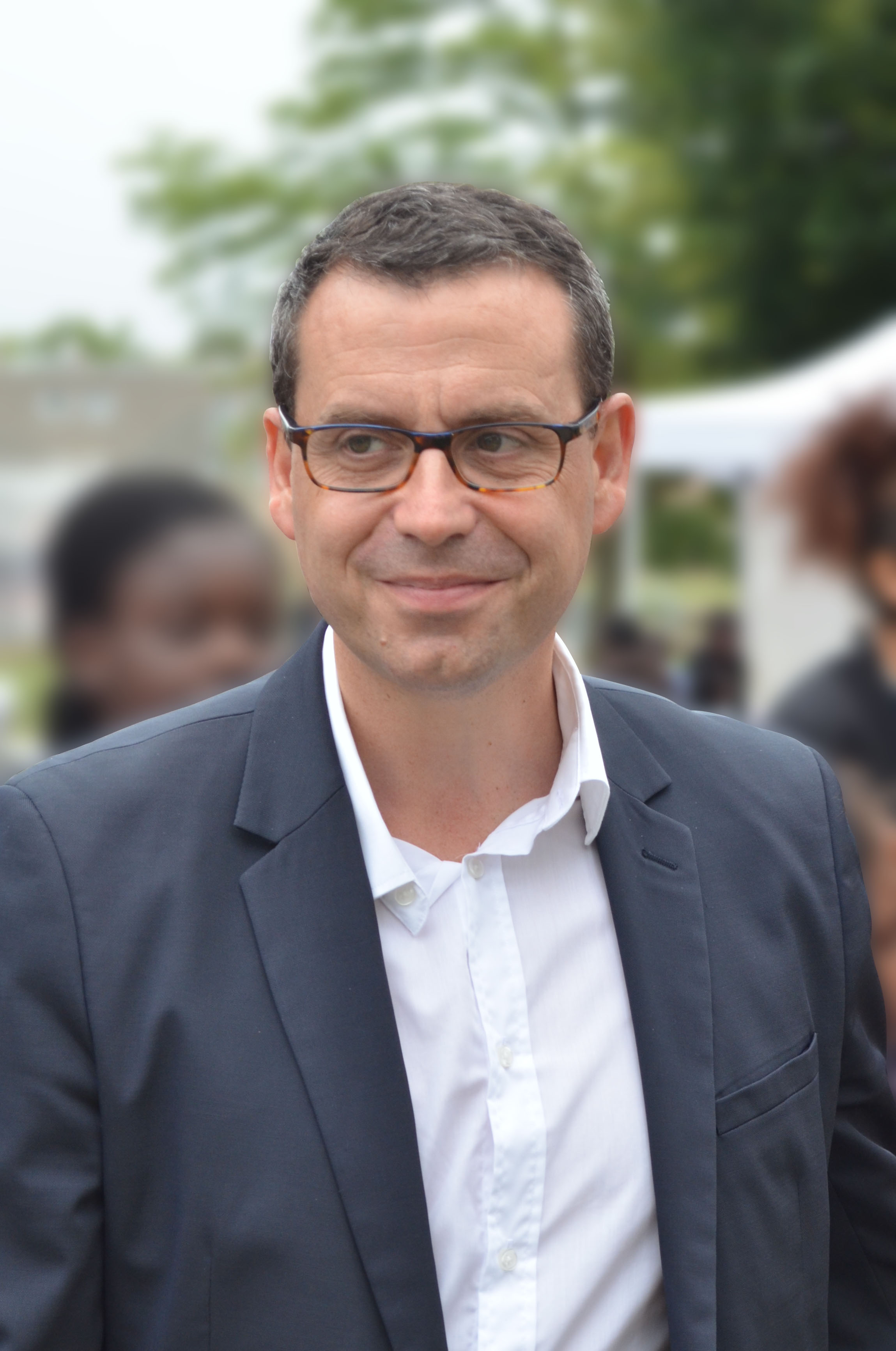
Philippe Rio

Philippe Rio (born 26 August 1974) is a French politician, serving as mayor of Grigny, Essonne. He is a member of the French Communist Party.

== Early life ==
Rio grew up in La Grande Borne in Grigny. He earned a master's degree in urban studies from Sciences Po. In 1995, he joined the French Communist Party.

== Career ==
Rio was first elected to the city council in 1998. In the 2014 French municipal elections, he was elected mayor for the first time. In the 2020 French municipal elections, he was re-elected mayor in the first round of voting, with 50,33% of the vote, a lead of 30% over the second-placed candidate. He also serves as co-president of the Committee on Social Inclusion, Participative Democracy and Human Rights of United Cities and Local Governments.

In 2016, he inaugurated a memorial for the abolition of slavery in Grigny.

In 2017, he led the Appeal from Grigny, a declaration signed by over a hundred mayors in France calling for increased investment into banlieue regions.

During the COVID-19 pandemic in France, he helped set up a number of city programmes, including distributing meals to isolating households, distributing facemasks to residents, and providing schoolkids with laptops to ensure their education could continue during lockdown.

In September 2021, he was awarded the World Mayor Prize by the City Mayors Foundation, on account of his "fight against poverty, handling of the COVID-19 pandemic, and his fight against inequality."

In November 2021, he called on the French government to intervene in the 2021 Bergams factory strike to prevent Bergams from liquidating the factory.
