= Canton of Viry-Châtillon =

Coordinates: 48.67°N 2.37°E

The canton of Viry-Châtillon is an administrative division of the Essonne department, Île-de-France region, northern France. Its borders were modified at the French canton reorganisation which came into effect in March 2015. Its seat is in Viry-Châtillon.

It consists of the following communes:

1. Grigny
2. Viry-Châtillon
