= Hôtel de Ville, Grigny =

Town hall in Grigny, France

Hôtel de Ville
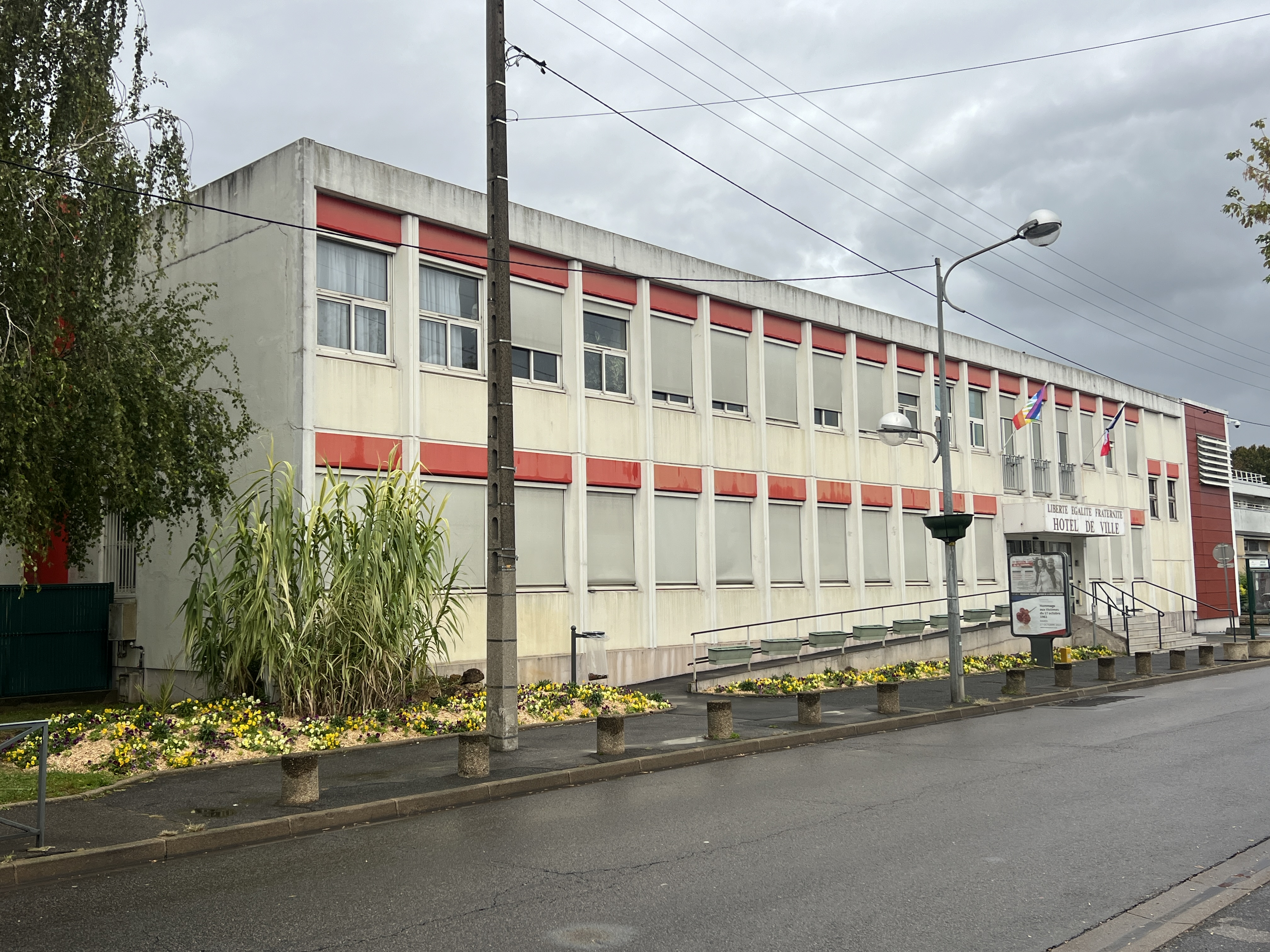
- The main frontage of the Hôtel de Ville in October 2023
- Interactive map of the Hôtel de Ville area

General information
- Type: City hall
- Architectural style: Modern style
- Location: Grigny, France
- Coordinates: 48.6562°N 2.3850°E
- Completed: 1974

The Hôtel de Ville (French pronunciation: [otɛl də vil], City Hall) is a municipal building in Grigny, Essonne, in the southern suburbs of Paris, standing on Route de Corbeil.

== History ==
Following the French Revolution, the town council initially met at the house of the mayor at the time. This arrangement continued until the mid-19th century when the council decided to commission a combined town hall and school. The site they selected, in the old part of the town, was owned by Sieur Pluchet and was acquired for FFr 5,000. The building was designed in the neoclassical style, built in ashlar stone and was completed in 1855. The design involved an asymmetrical main frontage of three bays facing onto the street. The right-hand bay contained a doorway, and the remainder of the building was fenestrated by casement windows. There was a dormer window above the central bay. After the building was no longer required for municipal use, it was sold to a private purchaser.

In the mid-1920s, following significant population growth, the council led by the mayor, René Piketty, decided to commission a more substantial combined town hall and school. The site they selected, on the south side of what is now Rue Gabriel Péri was owned by Louis and Alfred Police and was duly purchased. The building was designed by Sieur Aubert in the neoclassical style, built in millstone grit and was completed in 1933. The design involved a symmetrical main frontage of 13 bays facing onto the street. The layout consisted of a three-storey central block of three bays, a pair of single-storey connecting sections of three bays each, and a pair of three-storey end blocks of two bays each. The central bay contained a doorway on the ground floor, casement windows on the upper floors and a clock at roof level. The remainder of the building was fenestrated by casement windows. The central block contained the municipal office, while the left-hand wing accommodated the boys' school and the right-hand wing accommodated the girls' school. In the early 1960s, the capacity of the school was increased by adding an extra storey to the connecting sections. After the council vacated the building, it was exclusively used for educational purposes and continued to operate as the École Primaire Gabriel Péri (Gabriel Péri Primary School).

In the early 1970s, after the construction of two large housing developments, La Grande-Borne and Grigny II, the council led by the mayor, Jean Miaud, decided to commission a dedicated town hall. The site they selected, which was just to the south of École Primaire Gabriel Péri, had been occupied by the Château de Grigny which dated back at least to the 16th century. The seigneur of Bordes and of Grigny, Josias Mercier, allowed the château to be used as a refuge for persecuted Protestants fleeing from Paris between March 1599 and January 1600 following the signing of the Edict of Nantes which ended the French Wars of Religion.

The new building was designed in the modern style, built in concrete and glass and was completed in 1974. The design involved an asymmetrical main frontage of 21 bays facing onto Route de Corbeil. The 13th to 15th bays formed the entrance with a short flight of steps leading up to three glass doors. There was a concrete canopy above the doors and three French doors and a balcony on the first floor. The right-hand bay was blind apart from vents for the air conditioning system and the other bays were fenestrated by casement windows which were surmounted by red panels. Internally, the principal room was the Salle du Conseil (council chamber).
