= Grigny-Centre station =

French railway station

Grigny-Centre

General information
- Location: Grigny, Essonne, Île-de-France, France
- Coordinates: 48°39′12″N 2°23′45″E
- Line: Grigny to Corbeil-Essonnes line RER D

Other information
- Station code: 87681379

Passengers
- 2024: 6,171,646

Services
Preceding station	RER	Following station
Viry–Châtillon towards Creil	RER D	Orangis–Bois de l'Épine towards Corbeil-Essonnes
Location

Grigny-Centre is a railway station in Grigny, in the department of Essonne, France. It is served by RER Line D commuter trains.

== See also ==
- List of stations of the Paris RER
