= Hôtel de Ville, Viry-Châtillon =

Town hall in Viry-Châtillon, France

Hôtel de Ville
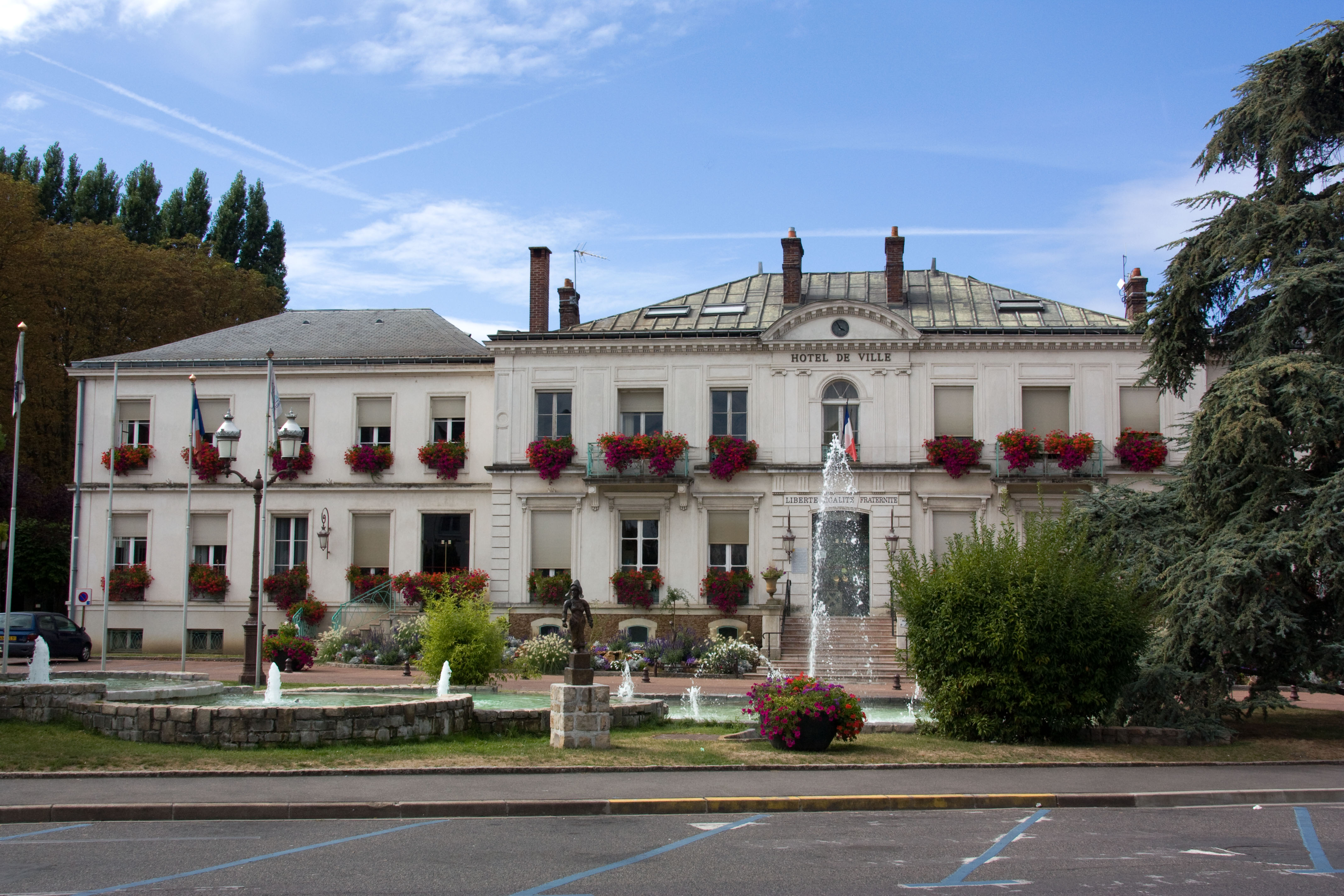
- The main frontage of the Hôtel de Ville in August 2009
- Interactive map of the Hôtel de Ville area

General information
- Type: City hall
- Architectural style: Neoclassical style
- Location: Viry-Châtillon, France
- Coordinates: 48.6713°N 2.3750°E
- Completed: 1855

The Hôtel de Ville (French pronunciation: [otɛl də vil], City Hall) is a municipal building in Viry-Châtillon, Essonne, in the southern suburbs of Paris, standing on Place de la République.

== History ==
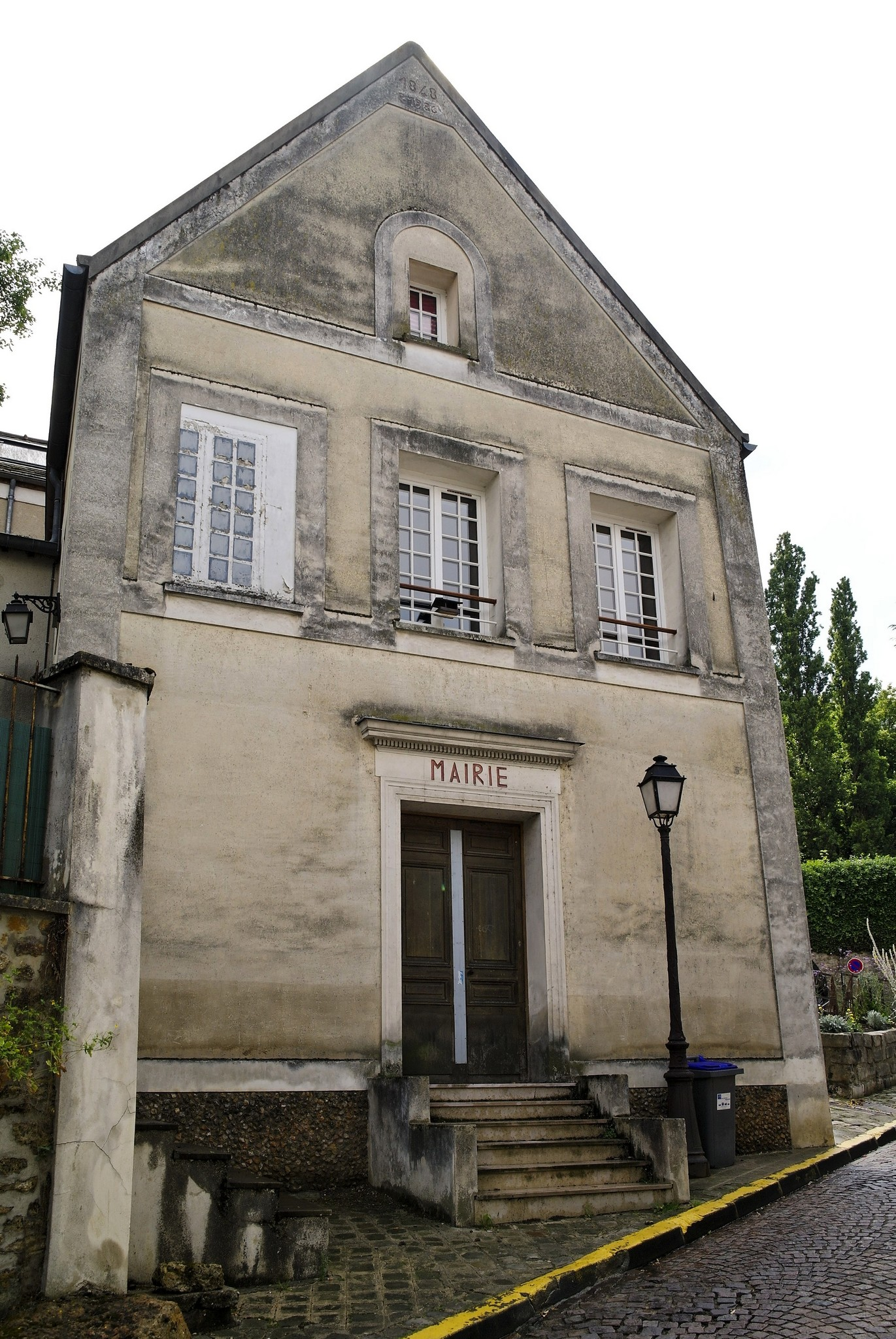
The first town hall on Rue Horace de Choiseul

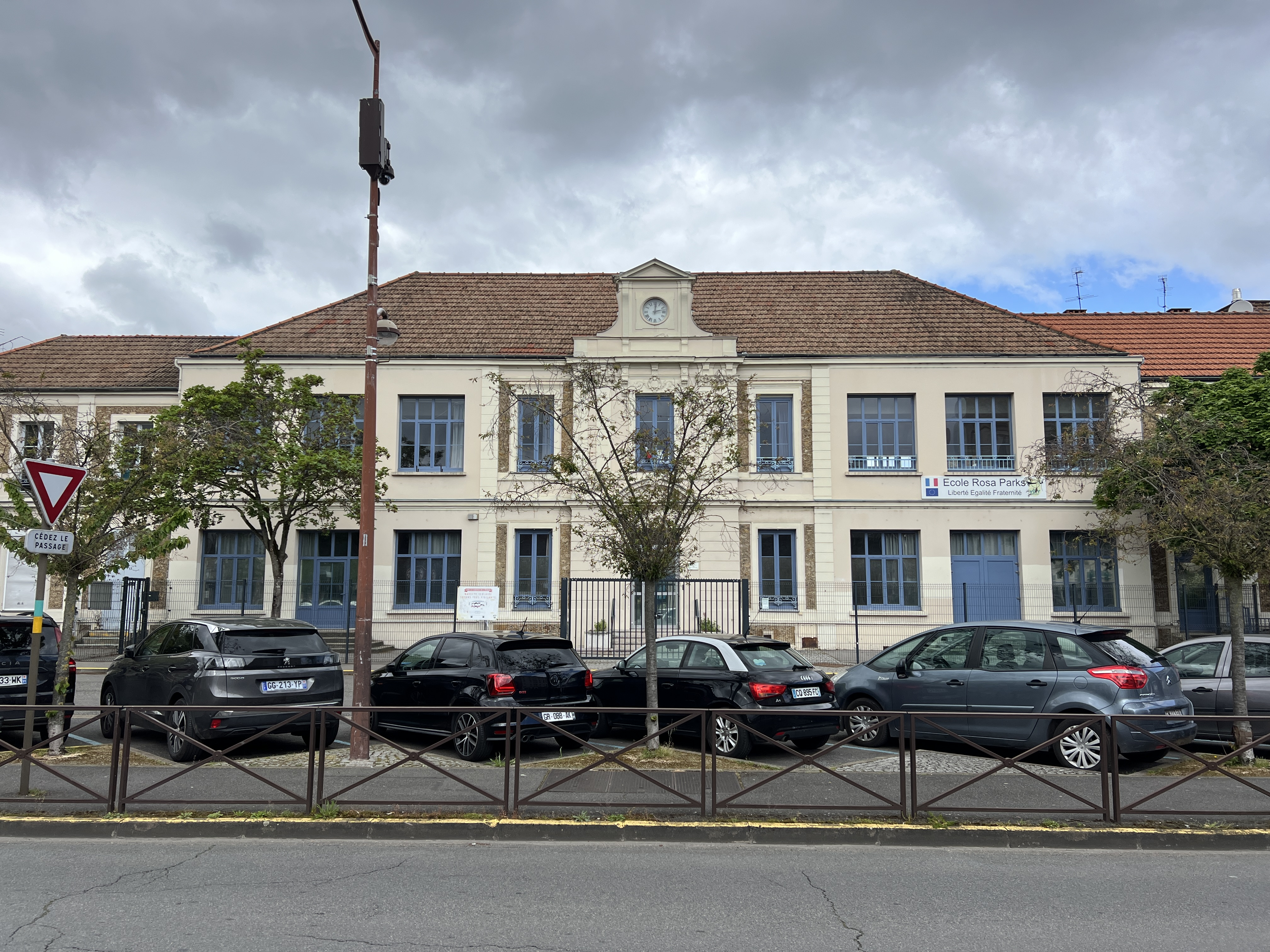
The new school, École Rosa Parks, on Place René Coty

Following the French Revolution, the town council initially met in the house of the mayor at the time. This arrangement continued until 1848 when the council established a town hall in a house on the south side of Rue Horace de Choiseul, close to the Church of Saint Denis. The design involved a symmetrical main frontage of the three bays facing onto the street. There was a doorway with a moulded surround and a cornice on the ground floor, three casement windows on the first floor, and a small casement window in the gable above.

After the first town hall became dilapidated, the council led by the mayor, Jean Louis Delarue, decided to commission a combined town hall and school. The site they selected, on land known as La Plâtrière on the corner of Place René-Coty and Rue Danielle Casanova, was acquired in 1885. The building was designed in the neoclassical style, built in ashlar stone and was completed in 1888. It was laid out as three pavilions with the town hall in the central pavilion and the girls' school in the left pavilion and the boys' school in the right pavilion. The central pavilion featured a doorway with a segmental pediment on the ground floor, a casement window on the first floor and a clock above. (Note: Although the original building has since been demolished, it was recreated on the same site at a cost €2 million, in a similar style but with a single frontage, and officially re-opened by the politicians, Laure Darcos and Jocelyne Guidez, as the École Rosa Parks in September 2019.)

On 24 August 1944, during the Second World War, in fighting to secure the liberation of the town, a local politician and member of the French Resistance, Marcel Perdereau, was shot and killed by German troops in the square in front of the town hall.

In the early 1960s, following significant population growth, the council led by the mayor, Henri Longuet, decided to establish a more substantial town hall. The building they selected was the Château Lacroix. The site had been occupied by the "Ferme de La Tournelle" (Farm of La Turnelle), an outbuilding of the Piédefer d'Aiguemont estate, in the 18th century. A former mayor, Jean-Baptiste Bruneau, commissioned a private house on the site in the mid-19th century. The house was designed in the neoclassical style, built in ashlar stone and was completed in around 1855.

The design involved a symmetrical main frontage of seven bays facing onto Place de la République. The central bay featured a short flight of steps leading up to a segmental headed doorway flanked by banded pilasters supporting an entablature with triglyphs. On the first floor, there was a round headed window flanked by two pairs of fluted Ionic order pilasters supporting an entablature and a segmental pediment with a clock in the tympanum. The other bays were fenestrated by casement windows with cornices on the ground floor and by casement windows surmounted by moulded panels on the first floor. The house was initially called Château La Tournelle until it was acquired by Sieur Lacroix and became Château Lacroix in 1924. A large park was established behind the house: two sandstone markers, which had been recovered from the old road from Versailles to Corbeil-Essonnes, were installed there and designated as monuments historique by the French government in 1934.

Although the house had been owned by the council since 1943, it was not converted for municipal use until 1962. A programme of works, involving the construction of two new wings and the creation a Salle du Conseil (council chamber), was completed in 1972.
