= Ronisia (singer) =

Cape Verdean singer and songwriter (born 1999)

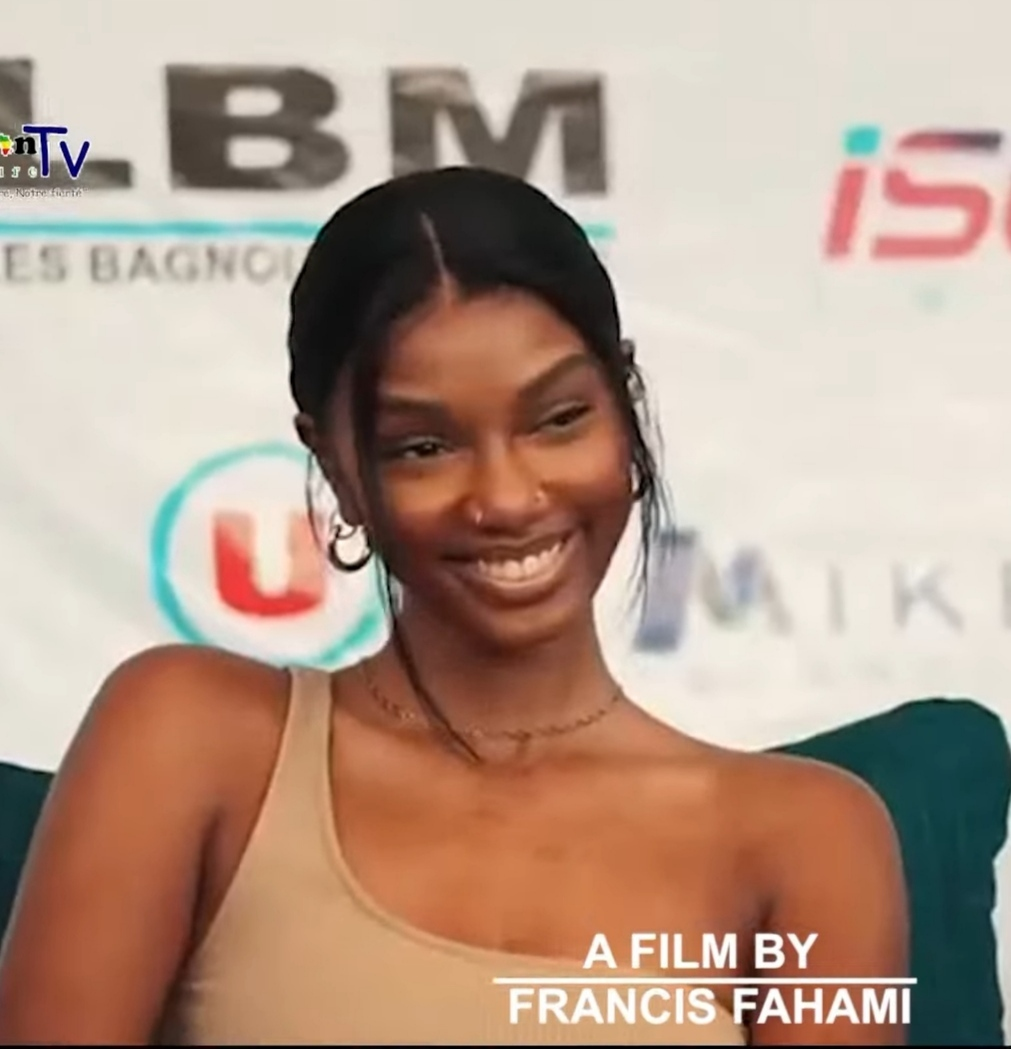
- Born: Ronizia Mendes Borges; 13 November 1999 (age 26); Tarrafal, Cape Verde
- Occupations: Singer, songwriter
- Years active: 2019–present
- Musical career
- Origin: Cape Verde (2019)
- Genres: Soul; Contemporary R&B
- Instruments: Vocals
- Label: Epic

Ronisia (born Ronizia Mendes Borges, 13 November 1999), is a Cape Verdean singer active in France.

== Biography ==
Ronizia Mendes Borges was born 13 November 1999 in Tarrafal, Cape Verde and grew up in Grigny, Essonne, France. While attending Pablo Neruda Middle School, she took dance lessons at the Espace Jeunes in Grigny. Young people in her neighborhood believed she had potential as a singer and encouraged her to go into the studio.

In May 2019, she released her first single, "Plus de Pain." She followed this with "Parano," "Désolée," "Pourquoi," and "Loin de moi," which helped her gain visibility on social media. In 2020, she further expanded her audience with the track "Atterrisage," which achieved significant success on TikTok and YouTube and was certified gold. In October of that same year, she signed with the label Epic Records.

In 2021, she released the singles "Doucement," "Toxic," and "Comme moi"—the latter featuring rapper Tiakola. In late December, with the release of the track "Téco," Ronisia announced her debut studio album, Ronisia, which was released on January 28, 2022. The album consists of 16 tracks and features collaborations with Ninho and Eva, and again with Tiakola. On December 9 2022, the album was reissued with six previously unreleased tracks and collaborations with Gazo and CKay.

Her second album, Era 24, was released on November 17, 2023, comprising 15 tracks plus three bonus tracks. The album features collaborations with Niska, Lisandro Cuxi, and British singer Amaria BB.

== Discography ==
=== Studio albums ===
- 2022 – Ronisia
- 2023 – Era 24

=== Singles ===
- 2019 – Plus de peine
- 2019 – Parano
- 2019 – Désolée
- 2020 – Pourquoi
- 2020 – Loin de moi
- 2020 – Atterrisage
- 2020 – Doucement
- 2021 – Toxic
- 2021 – Dans ça
- 2021 – Comme moi (feat. Tiakola)
- 2021 – Ma philosophie
- 2021 – Bonita
- 2021 – Téco
- 2022 – Longue vie (feat. Eva)
- 2022 – J'élimine
- 2022 – 200 km/h (feat. Gazo)
- 2022 – Problème (feat. CKay)
- 2023 – C'est toi
- 2023 – Joli coeur
- 2023 – I Got U (feat. Niska)
- 2023 – Chill (feat. Lisandro Cuxi)
- 2023 – Fêter ça (feat. Amaria BB)
- 2023 – Méchante/Hey Boo
- 2024 – C'est comment
- 2025 – Call of
- 2025 – Ennemi (con Rsko)
- 2025 – Fan
- 2025 – Swipe
