= Charlotte Britz =

German politician

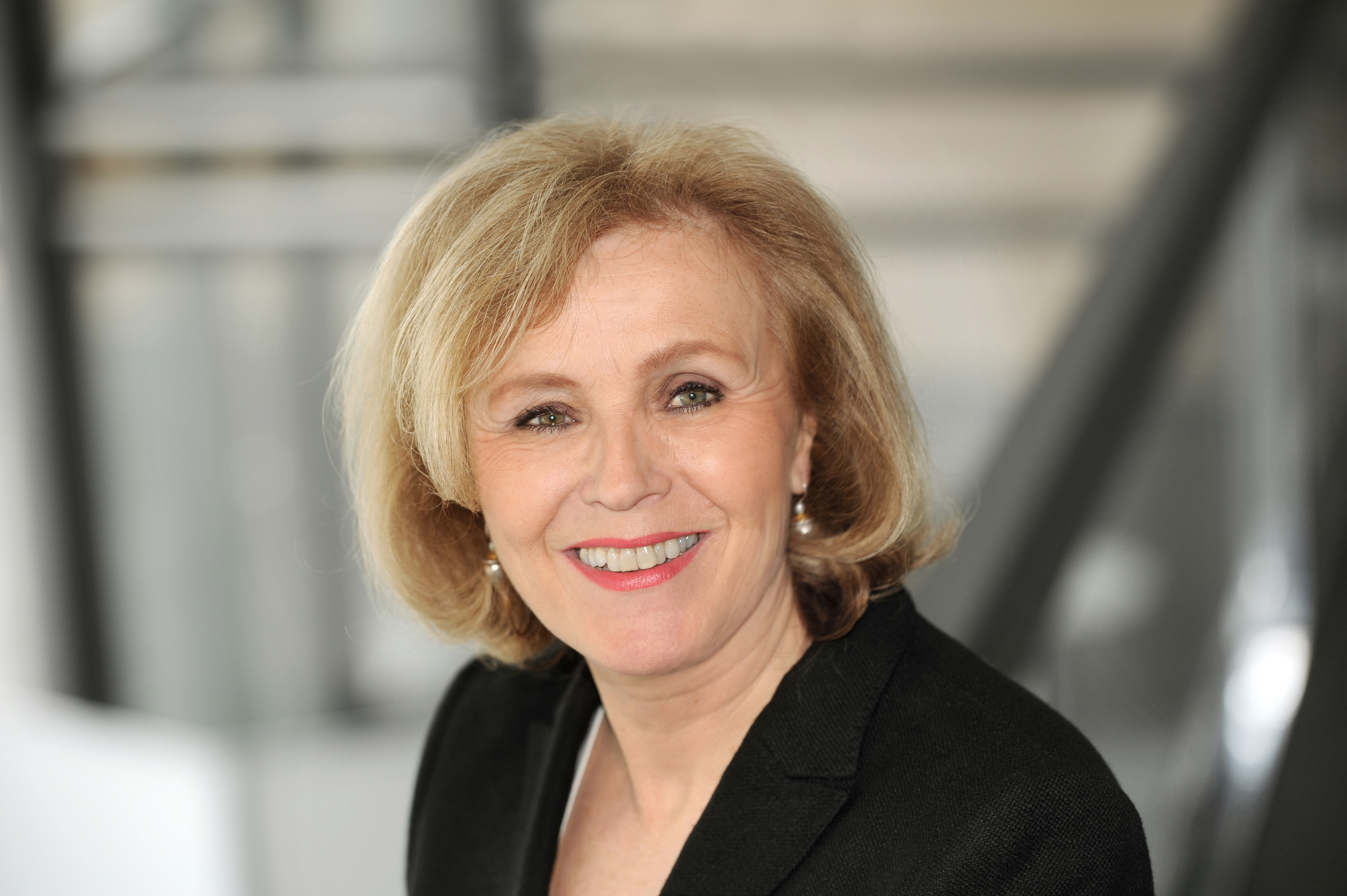

Mayor of Saarbrücken
- In office 1 October 2004 – 30 September 2019
- Deputy: Kajo Breuer (2004–2010); Ralf Latz (2010–)
- Preceded by: Hajo Hoffmann (suspended); Kajo Breuer (interim)
- Succeeded by: Uwe Conradt

Deputy Leader of SPD Saar
- In office 2007 – 13 November 2021
- Leader: Heiko Maas (1999–2018); Anke Rehlinger (2018–)

Head of Saarbrücken Social Department
- In office 1996–2004

Member of Saarbrücken City Council
- In office 1989–1996

Personal details
- Born: 27 February 1958 (age 67); Ottweiler, Saarland, West Germany
- Political party: SPD
- Children: 1

Charlotte Britz (born 27 February 1958) is a former German politician who served as Mayor of Saarbrücken from 2004 until 2019.

== Politics ==
Charlotte Britz joined the Social Democratic Party (SPD) at the age of 16. She was first elected to the Saarbrücken City Council in 1989 and was re-elected in 1994. In 1996, she was elected Head of the City Social Department and subsequently resigned from her seat in the city council.

Britz ran for the position as mayor of Saarbrücken in 2004 and defeated the Christian Democratic candidate Josef Hecken in the runoff. In 2011, she was re-elected with an overall majority in the first ballot, avoiding a runoff. Ahead of the Saarland state election in 2017, she was considered a potential Social Democratic candidate for Minister-President of Saarland, but chose not to run. Britz was nominated for the World Mayor Prize in 2018.

She sought a third term in the 2019 local elections and received the most votes in the first ballot on 26 May. In the runoff on 9 June, the Christian Democratic candidate Uwe Conradt defeated her narrowly by 0.6 percent, ending a 43 year long streak of Social Democratic mayors in Saarbrücken. Her term as mayor expired on 30 September 2019.
