= Viry-Châtillon =

Commune in Île-de-France, France

- Commune
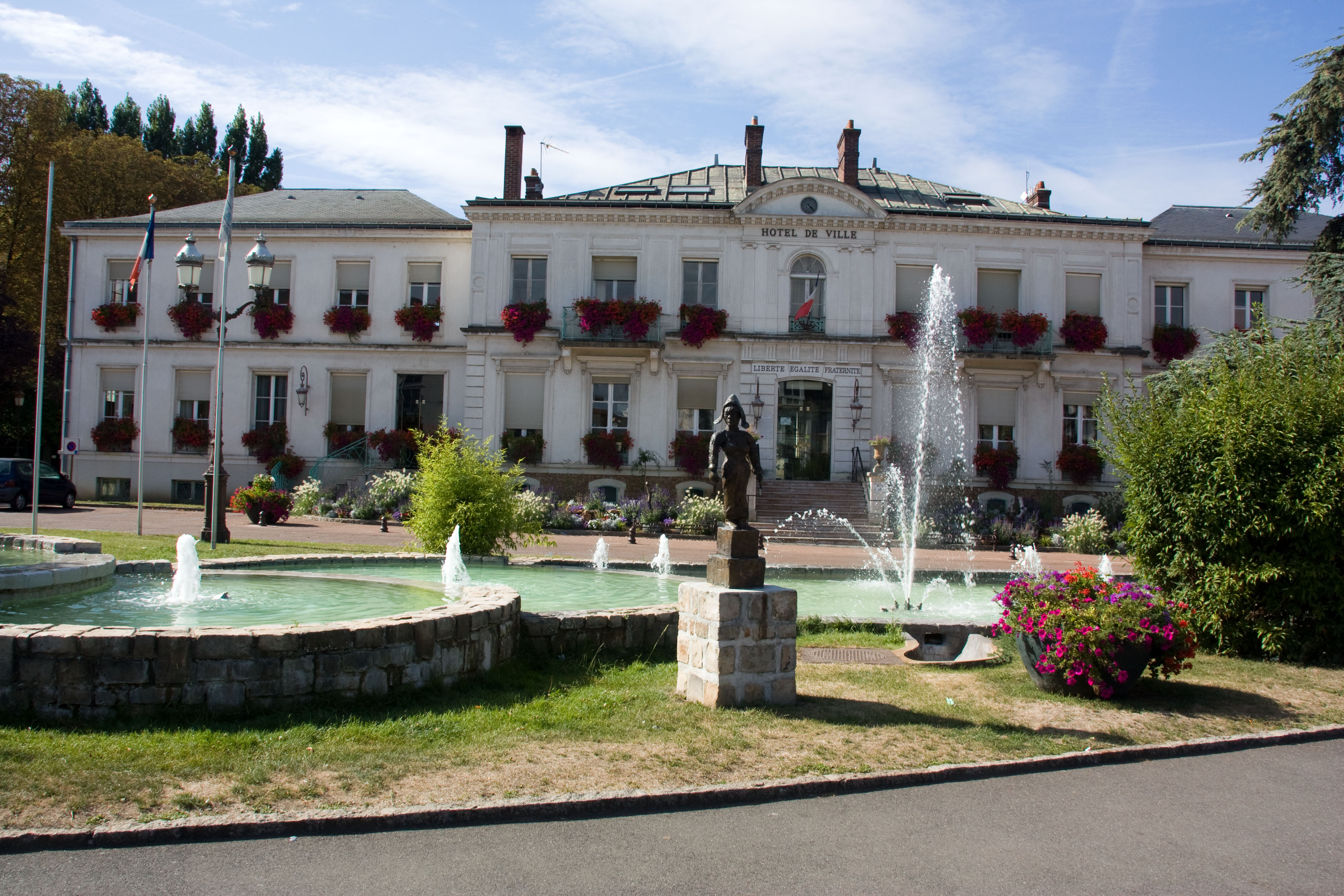
- The Hôtel de Ville

- Coat of arms

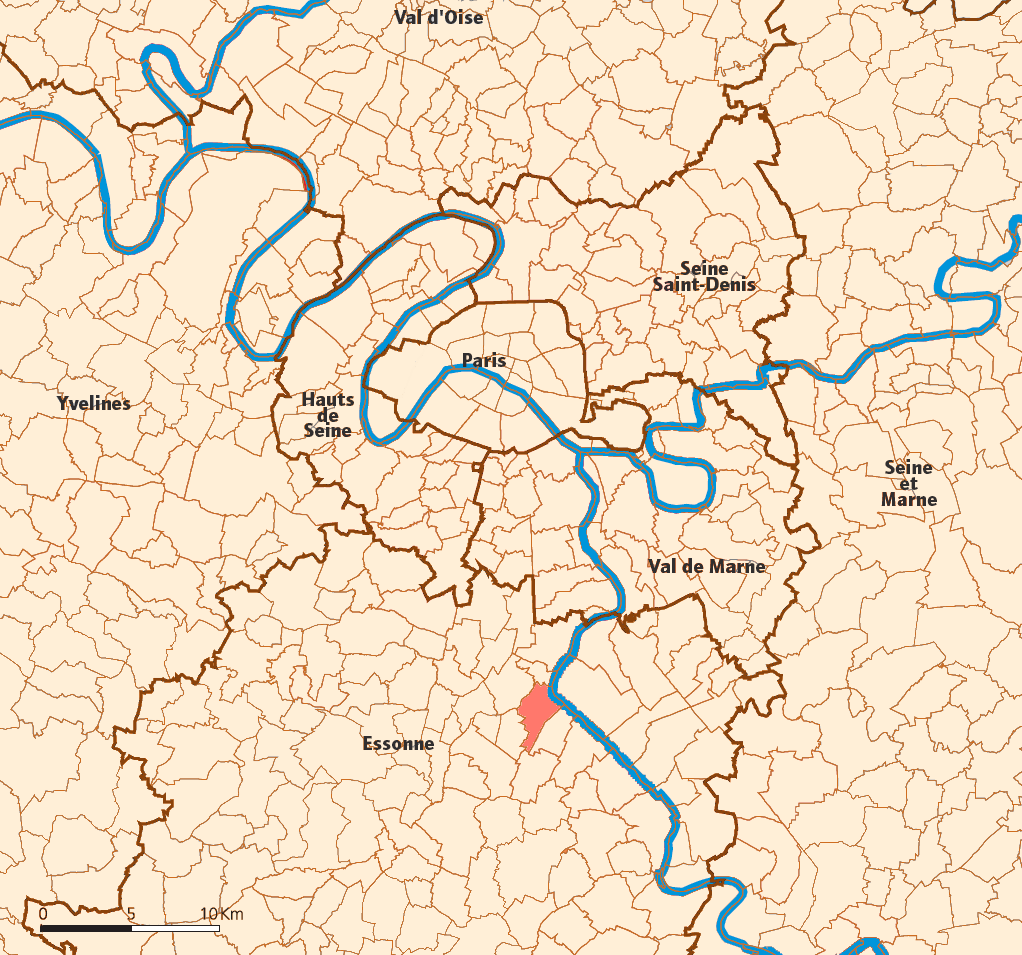
- Location (in red) within Paris inner and outer suburbs
- Location of Viry-Châtillon
- Location within France Location within Île-de-France (region)
- Coordinates: 48°40′17″N 2°22′30″E
- Country: France
- Region: Île-de-France
- Department: Essonne
- Arrondissement: Évry
- Canton: Viry-Châtillon
- Intercommunality: Grand Paris

Government
  - Mayor (2020–2026): Jean-Marie Vilain (LC)
- Area^{1}: 6.07 km^{2} (2.34 sq mi)
- Highest elevation: 84 m (276 ft)
- Lowest elevation: 32 m (105 ft)
- Population (2023): 30,838
  - Density: 5,080/km^{2} (13,200/sq mi)
- Time zone: UTC+01:00 (CET)
  - Summer (DST): UTC+02:00 (CEST)
- INSEE/Postal code: 91687 /91170
- Website: www.ville-viry-chatillon.fr
- ^{1} French Land Register data, which excludes lakes, ponds, glaciers > 1 km^{2} (0.386 sq mi or 247 acres) and river estuaries.

Viry-Châtillon (French pronunciation: [viʁi ʃatijɔ̃]) is a commune in the southern suburbs of Paris, France. It is located 20.9 km (13.0 mi) from the centre of Paris.

== Toponymy ==
The name Viry possibly derives from the Latin Viriacum, meaning the 'estate of Virius', a Gallo-Roman personal name. Châtillon derives from the Latin castellum, meaning 'castle'.

== History ==
The Hôtel de Ville was completed in around 1855.

== Population ==
Inhabitants of Viry-Châtillon are also known as Castelvirois in French.

Historical population

Year	Pop.	±% p.a.
1793	408	—
1800	373	−1.27%
1806	380	+0.31%
1821	366	−0.25%
1831	404	+0.99%
1836	389	−0.75%
1841	462	+3.50%
1846	533	+2.90%
1851	550	+0.63%
1856	564	+0.50%
1861	575	+0.39%
1866	663	+2.89%
1872	541	−3.33%
1876	669	+5.45%
1881	873	+5.47%
1886	1,110	+4.92%
1891	1,182	+1.26%
1896	1,409	+3.58%
1901	1,540	+1.79%

Year	Pop.	±% p.a.
1906	1,824	+3.44%
1911	2,272	+4.49%
1921	2,766	+1.99%
1926	5,660	+15.40%
1931	8,442	+8.32%
1936	9,234	+1.81%
1946	9,495	+0.28%
1954	10,622	+1.41%
1962	23,598	+10.49%
1968	27,045	+2.30%
1975	32,411	+2.62%
1982	30,224	−0.99%
1990	30,580	+0.15%
1999	30,257	−0.12%
2007	31,249	+0.40%
2012	31,221	−0.02%
2017	31,093	−0.08%
2023	30,838	−0.14%

Source: EHESS and INSEE (1968-2023)

== Sports ==
The town is home to the women's football team Paris FC. It was also the base of the engine division of the Formula One constructor Renault from 1977 to 2025.

== Twin towns – sister cities ==
Viry-Châtillon is twinned with:

- Erftstadt, Germany
- Wokingham, England, United Kingdom

== Transport ==
Viry-Châtillon is served by Viry-Châtillon station on the Paris RER line D.

== Port-Aviation ==
In May 1909 a venue for aviation races and exhibitions, Port-Aviation, opened to the public in Viry-Châtillon as the world's first purpose-built aerodrome. A popular attraction, it hosted aviation exhibitions and air races, attracting large crowds from Paris. It was the site of many aviation experiments and firsts and also hosted horse racing, bicycle racing, and cross country running events. Savigny-sur-Orge station in neighboring Savigny-sur-Orge served the airfield's distinguished visitors, while most of the general public attending events at Port-Aviation arrived by rail at Juvisy station in Juvisy-sur-Orge, where a sign in the railway station directed visitors to "Juvisy Airfield." Much to the consternation of the civic leaders and residents of Viry-Châtillon, this led the press and post card publishers to refer habitually to Port-Aviation by the misnomers "Juvisy Airfield," and occasionally "Savigny Airfield," and to aviation events there as taking place in "Juvisy" or "Juvisy-sur-Orge." The misnomer "Juvisy Airfield" for Port-Aviation and the inaccurate association of Juvisy-sur-Orge with its location have persisted ever since. Port-Aviation closed to the public in 1914 due to financial problems, but during World War I served as a military aviation training site before it was abandoned in 1918. A housing district, also called Port-Aviation, was constructed on the site of the former airfield between 1919 and 1933 and by the 21st century had a population of 5,000 people. In 2009, Viry-Châtillon commemorated the centennial of Port-Aviation and opened a heritage trail for pedestrians with signs indicating the locations of the airfield's structures, only one of which survives.

== See also ==
- Communes of the Essonne department
