= City Mayors Foundation =

Think tank

The City Mayors Foundation, also known as City Mayors, is an international think tank dedicated to urban affairs. It has been active since 2003 and runs both the CityMayors.com website and the biennial World Mayor award.

City Mayors has also instituted its own Code of Ethics for city leaders who wish to perform their duties beyond all reproach.

The City Mayors Foundation commissions the trophy presented as the World Mayor Award. The trophy was designed by artist Manuel Ferrari and is handmade of steel by the metalworker Kaspar Swankey.

== History ==
The initial City Mayors website was set up in 2003 by Tann vom Hove (UK/Germany), Ruth Maguire (UK), Guy Kervella (UK/France), Nick Swift (Canada) and Josh Fecht (US). In 2004 Andrew Stevens (UK), Mayraj Fahim (US), Tony Favro (US) and Adriana Maciel (Mexico) joined City Mayors.
