= Uwe Conradt =

German politician

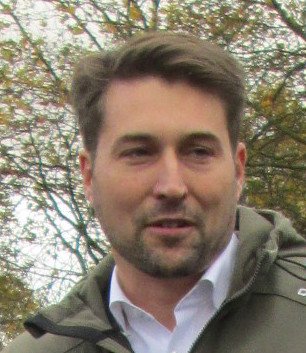

Mayor of Saarbrücken
- Incumbent
- Assumed office 1 October 2019
- Deputy: Ralf Latz (2019–2020); Barbara Meyer-Gluche (2020–)
- Preceded by: Charlotte Britz

Head of the Saarland Media Authority
- In office 2016 – 1 October 2019

Member of the Landtag of Saarland
- In office August 2012 – May 2016
- Preceded by: Peter Jacoby
- Succeeded by: Petra Fretter

Member of the Saarbrücken City Council
- In office 2009 – September 2019

Member of the Dudweiler District Council
- In office 1999–2004

Personal details
- Born: 31 March 1977 (age 49) Saarbrücken, Saarland, West Germany
- Party: CDU
- Spouse: Jana Conradt
- Children: 3
- Education: Saarland University

Uwe Conradt (born 31 March 1977) is a German Christian Democratic politician who has been serving as Mayor of Saarbrücken since 2019.

== Politics ==
Uwe Conradt joined the Young Union in 1990 and became a member of the CDU in 1994. He was Member of the Dudweiler District Council from 1999 until 2004 and became Member of the Saarbrücken City Council in 2009. He succeeded Peter Jacoby as Member of the Landtag of Saarland in August 2012 until 2016, when he was appointed Director of the State Media Authority.

He succeeded Peter Strobel as Speaker of the CDU City Council Group in 2018 and ran for the office of Mayor in the local elections on 26 May 2019. He received 29.0 percent, finishing second to the incumbent Charlotte Britz, a Social Democrat, who received 36.8 percent. Both advanced to the runoff election which took place on 9 June, in which he surprisingly defeated Britz with 50.3 percent of the votes, ending a 43 years lasting streak of Social Democratic Mayors in Saarbrücken. He vacated his council seat in September 2019.

He assumed the office of Mayor on 1 October 2019 and is being backed by a so-called Jamaica coalition of CDU, the Green Party and the Free Democrats.

== Sources ==
- Personal homepage
- Uwe Conradt on the Saarbrücken city homepage
