= Grigny, Essonne =

Commune in Île-de-France, France

Grigny
- Commune
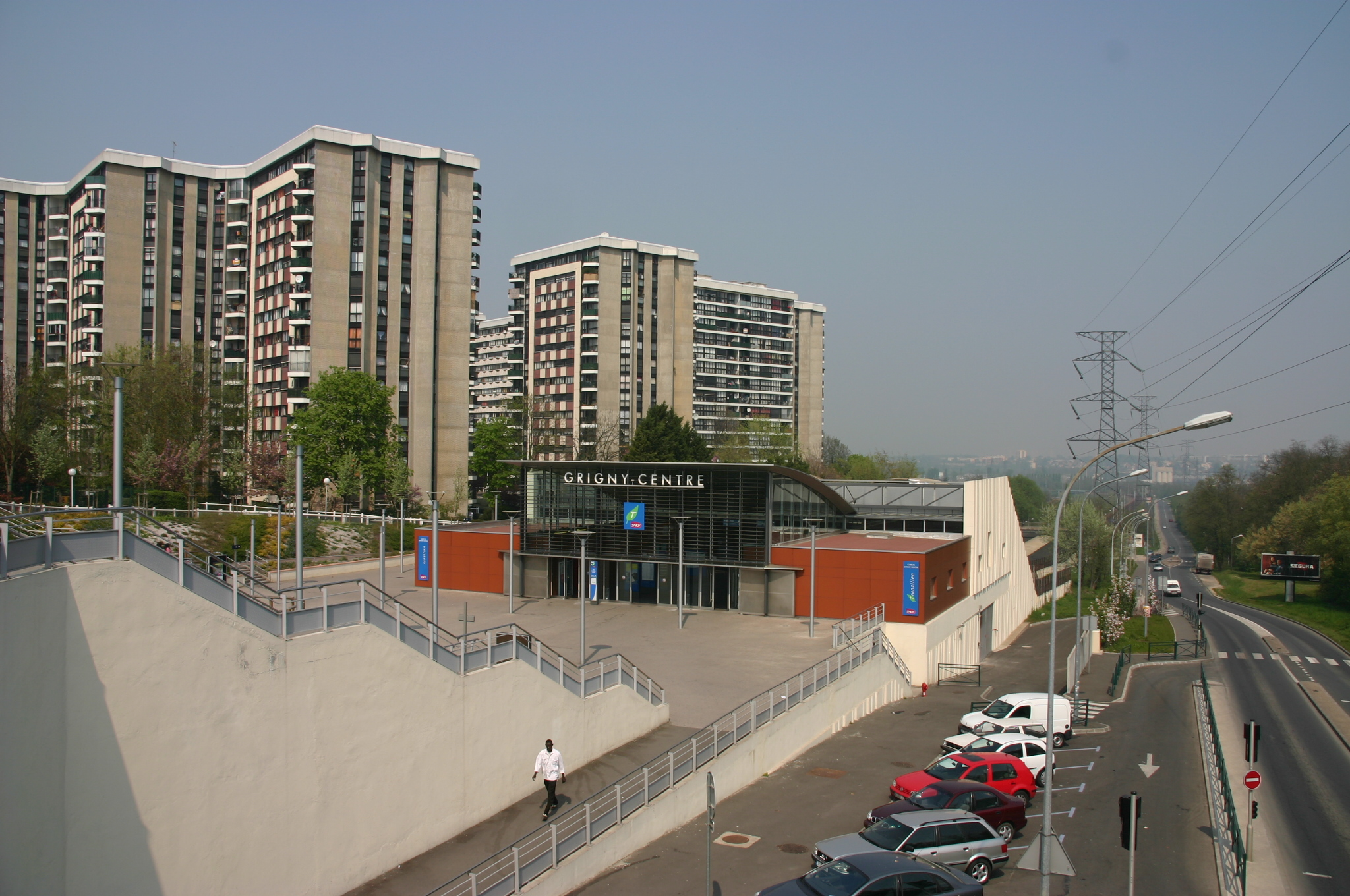
- Railway station

- Coat of arms

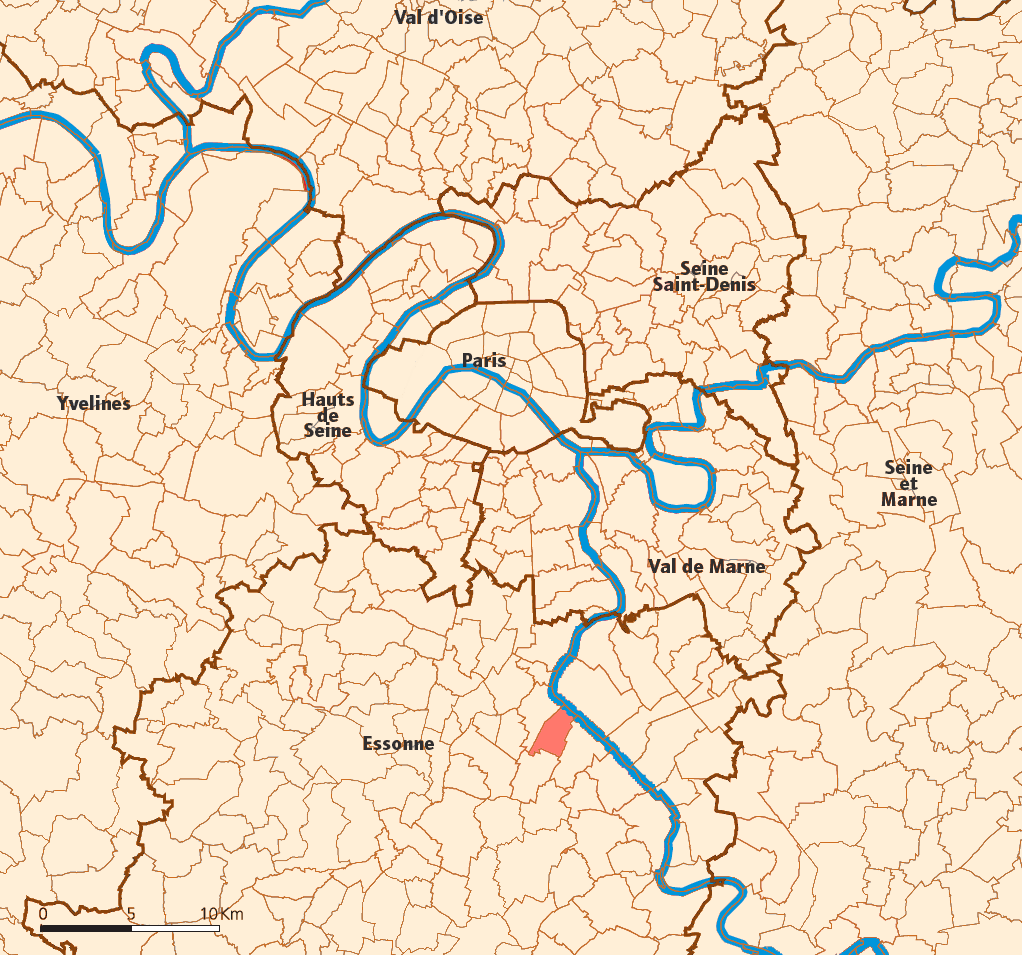
- Location (in red) within Paris inner and outer suburbs
- Location of Grigny
- Location within France Location within Île-de-France (region)
- Coordinates: 48°39′22″N 2°23′06″E
- Country: France
- Region: Île-de-France
- Department: Essonne
- Arrondissement: Évry
- Canton: Viry-Châtillon
- Intercommunality: CA Grand Paris Sud Seine-Essonne-Sénart

Government
  - Mayor (2020–2026): Philippe Rio
- Area^{1}: 4.87 km^{2} (1.88 sq mi)
- Highest elevation: 84 m (276 ft)
- Lowest elevation: 32 m (105 ft)
- Population (2023): 26,842
  - Density: 5,510/km^{2} (14,300/sq mi)
- Demonym: French: grignois(e)
- Time zone: UTC+01:00 (CET)
  - Summer (DST): UTC+02:00 (CEST)
- INSEE/Postal code: 91286 /91350
- ^{1} French Land Register data, which excludes lakes, ponds, glaciers > 1 km^{2} (0.386 sq mi or 247 acres) and river estuaries.

Grigny (French pronunciation: [ɡʁiɲi]) is a commune in the southern suburbs of Paris, Île-de-France, France. It is located 21.8 km (13.5 mi) from the center of Paris.

== History ==
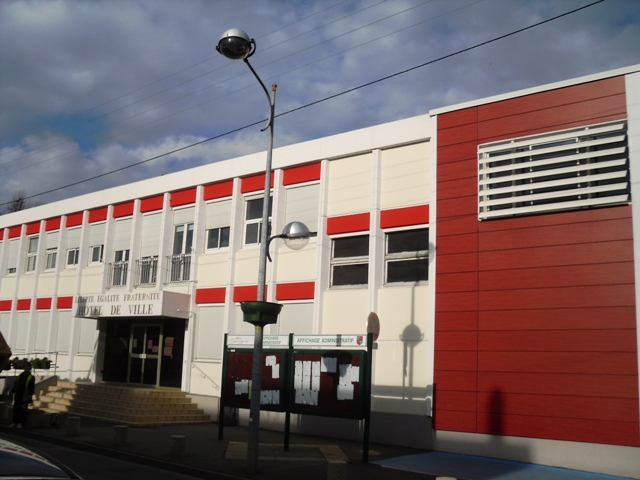
The Hôtel de Ville

The Hôtel de Ville was completed in 1974.

== Population ==
Historical population

Year	Pop.	±% p.a.
1793	370	—
1821	449	+0.69%
1846	458	+0.08%
1872	488	+0.24%
1901	704	+1.27%
1911	797	+1.25%
1921	835	+0.47%
1926	1,080	+5.28%
1931	1,305	+3.86%
1936	1,042	−4.40%
1946	1,007	−0.34%

Year	Pop.	±% p.a.
1954	1,132	+1.47%
1962	1,719	+5.36%
1968	2,938	+9.34%
1975	25,653	+36.28%
1982	26,180	+0.29%
1990	24,920	−0.61%
1999	24,512	−0.18%
2007	26,637	+1.04%
2012	27,713	+0.80%
2017	28,737	+0.73%
2023	26,842	−1.13%

Source: EHESS and INSEE (1968-2023)

== Transportation ==
Grigny is served by Grigny-Centre station on Paris RER line D.

== Avenue des Sablons ==
The Avenue des Sablons, about 10 km long, is the main thoroughfare of Grigny, a small town in the suburbs of Paris. A new town, developed in the 1970s, Grigny has been the target of massive investment in house construction. The Avenue des Sablons, as the town's main street, gives access to about 4,000 residential properties, and construction is still in progress. Many estate agents and letting agents are located here because of the great potential of the area. It is located in the district of Grigny 2.

== Crime ==
The city has one of the highest rates of poverty and crime in the Essonne. There have been riots, particularly in the area of the Grande Borne. There were overnight clashes in Grigny on 6–7 November 2005, which left 10 police injured, two seriously.

On 28 May 2016, a police car was destroyed and two police officers were injured in clashes with over one hundred youths. Some thirty people armed with stones, bottles and iron bars forced a police patrol to turn back and were later joined by 70 others. A single person was arrested.

On 8 July 2016, police investigated a burned car and were greeted by several bowling balls, glass bottles and stones thrown from towers. Five policemen were wounded by the missile throwing and it took reinforcements of the National Gendarmerie to restore calm.

== Notable people ==
- Amedy Coulibaly, one of three perpetrators of the January 2015 Île-de-France attacks
- Pierre-Paul Lemercier de La Rivière de Saint-Médard (1719-1801)
- Sandrine Bonnaire, actress
- Ronisia, singer

== See also ==
- Communes of the Essonne department
