= Kimberly Eddleston =

Business science professor

Kimberly Ann Eddleston is the Schulze Distinguished Professor of Entrepreneurship, and Professor of Entrepreneurship & Innovation at D’Amore-McKim School of Business, Northeastern University. Her expertise on subjects related to family business management and small business management is quoted in US sources. She has received many academic awards by US institutions and is a leading editor of several academic journals.

== Education ==
Eddleston's education leaned towards business studies driven by family ties. She obtained a BS in Business Administration from Bryant University (Smithfield, RI) in 1992. She gained an MS in Hotel Administration from Institut de Management Hotelier International, Cornell University/Groupe ESSEC in 1995. She obtained a Ph.D. in Business Administration from the University of Connecticut in 2001.

== Career ==
Eddleston worked as an assistant director at Westin Hotel Copley Place, Boston, MA (1995-1996). She was an Assistant Director of the Wolff Family Program in Entrepreneurship, at the University of Connecticut (Storrs, CT.) from 1996 to 2001. At this university she was a Lecturer of Management at the School of Business Administration from 2000 to 2001. In 2001, she began a teaching and research career at her current institution, the D’Amore-McKim School of Business, Northeastern University (Boston), where she successively became an Assistant Professor (since 2001), Associate Professor (since 2008), and Full Professor of Entrepreneurship & Innovation since 2014.

She is a Montoni Research Fellow, and a Faculty Fellow at Cornell University’s Smith Family Business Initiative. Additionally, she has held appointments as a Research Fellow at the University of St. Gallen Center for Family Business, Toft Professor in Family Business at Jönköping International Business School (2013 – 2015), Visiting Scholar at the Free University of Bozen-Bolzano (2018), and Visiting Scholar in Small Business at Florida Atlantic University, (2018 – 2019).

=== Editorial ===
She is the founding editor, and Editor in Chief of familybusiness.org, and a Senior Editor of the Entrepreneur & Innovation Exchange (eix.org). Also, she is or has been an editor of other academic journals including Organizational Dynamics, Entrepreneurship Theory and Practice, Journal of Family Business Strategy, Strategic Entrepreneurship Journal, Small Business Economics, Asia Pacific Journal of Management, Long Range Planning, Strategic Entrepreneurship Journal, and Journal of Business Venturing.

=== Awards ===
In 2012, Eddleston received the Raymond E. Miles Distinguished Scholar Award in 2012 from the University of North Texas. In 2006 and 2015 she received Family Owned Business Institute Scholar Award from Grand Valley State University. In 2015, she received the Schulze Distinguished Professor of Entrepreneurship.

Her research received awards from learned societies, among them the Academy of Management (2002), the Family Firm Institute (2010, 2018), the International Family Enterprise Research Academy (IFERA), and the US Association for Small Business & Entrepreneurship, USASBE (2015, 2017).

=== Papers ===
Eddleston has published over 160 papers, which have been cited over 15,000 times, according to Google Scholar. Her most cited papers are:

- Martins, Luis L.; Eddleston, Kimberly A.; Veiga, John F. (2002-04-01). "Moderators of the Relationship Between Work-Family Conflict and Career Satisfaction". Academy of Management Journal. 45 (2): 399–409. doi:10.5465/3069354. ISSN 0001-4273
- Kellermanns, Franz W.; Eddleston, Kimberly A. (2004-05-01). "Feuding Families: When Conflict Does a Family Firm Good". Entrepreneurship Theory and Practice. 28 (3): 209–228. doi:10.1111/j.1540-6520.2004.00040.x. ISSN 1042-2587
- Eddleston, Kimberly A.; Kellermanns, Franz W. (2007-07-01). "Destructive and productive family relationships: A stewardship theory perspective". Journal of Business Venturing. 22 (4): 545–565. doi:10.1016/j.jbusvent.2006.06.004. ISSN 0883-9026
- Zellweger, Thomas M.; Eddleston, Kimberly A.; Kellermanns, Franz W. (2010-03-01). "Exploring the concept of familiness: Introducing family firm identity". Journal of Family Business Strategy. 1 (1): 54–63. doi:10.1016/j.jfbs.2009.12.003. ISSN 1877-8585

=== Book ===
Jennings, J.E., Eddleston, K.A., Jennings, P.D. & Sarathy, R. 2015. Firms Within Families: Enterprising in Diverse Country Contexts. Edward Elgar Publishing.
