= Donald S. Siegel =

American economist and academic administrator

Academic background
- Education: Columbia University (B.A.); Columbia Business School (Ph.D.)

Academic work
- Discipline: Managerial economics
- Institutions: Arizona State University
- Awards: Sloan Research Fellowship (1988); Global Award for Entrepreneurship Research
- Website: Information at IDEAS / RePEc

Donald S. Siegel is an American economist whose research focuses on innovation, entrepreneurship, technology transfer, and corporate social responsibility. He is Regents Professor and Foundation Professor of Public Policy and Management in the School of Public Affairs at Arizona State University and co-executive director of its Global Center for Technology Transfer. He is an Editor-In-Chief of Small Business Economics.

== Early life and education ==
Siegel was born in Brooklyn, New York, and attended James Madison High School. He received a B.A. in economics from Columbia College in 1981. He earned an M.Phil. and a Ph.D. in business economics from Columbia Business School in 1988. He later held a Sloan Research Fellowship at the National Bureau of Economic Research.

== Career ==
After four years as an assistant professor of management and policy at Stony Brook University, Siegel joined Arizona State University as an associate professor of economics in 1994 and was promoted to full professor in 1999. In 2000, he joined the Nottingham University Business School in the United Kingdom as chair and professor of industrial economics.

In 2002, Siegel moved to Rensselaer Polytechnic Institute, where he served as professor of economics and department chair. In 2006, he joined the University of California, Riverside as professor of entrepreneurship and associate dean for graduate studies.

In 2008, Siegel was appointed dean of the School of Business at the University at Albany, SUNY, a position he held until 2016.

Siegel rejoined Arizona State University in 2017 as director of the School of Public Affairs and Foundation Professor of Public Policy and Management. In 2022, he became co-executive director of ASU's newly established Global Center for Technology Transfer. In December 2025, ASU announced that he had been named a Regents Professor for 2026.

== Research ==
Siegel's research has examined university technology transfer, academic entrepreneurship, corporate social responsibility, productivity, corporate governance, and the effects of mergers and acquisitions, divestitures, and private equity transactions.

Siegel's early research on innovation was funded by the National Science Foundation, the American Statistical Association, the W. E. Upjohn Institute for Employment Research, and the Sloan Foundation. It examined the relationship between innovation and productivity and sought to estimate the private and social returns to federally funded research. This work included production-, cost-, and distance-function estimation and appeared in journals including the American Economic Review and Review of Economics and Statistics. In productivity economics, Siegel co-authored a study with Frank R. Lichtenberg using linked research and development and manufacturing data to examine the relationship between research and development investment and productivity. He later studied the effects of technology, trade, and outsourcing on employment and labor composition with Catherine J. Morrison Paul. His book Skill-Biased Technological Change examined technology adoption, skill upgrading, and labor-market changes using a firm-level survey.

A central strand of Siegel's work concerns the organization and performance of university technology transfer. In 1998, Siegel, David Waldman, and Albert N. Link received support from the NBER–Sloan Foundation Project on Industrial Technology and Productivity to study the effects of organizational practices and workplace conditions on technology-transfer performance. Their subsequent study estimated the relative productivity of technology transfer offices at 113 universities and found that environmental and institutional factors did not fully explain performance differences, pointing to organizational practices as an additional determinant. He later co-authored a comparison of technology transfer offices in the United States and United Kingdom using stochastic multiple-output distance functions.

His related research has addressed the commercialization of university intellectual property, entrepreneurial activity at universities and the economic and societal implications of academic spin-offs and research commercialization, and academic entrepreneurship after the Bayh–Dole Act. In later NSF-funded work, Siegel and his co-authors examined how organizational justice, role conflict, identity, motivation, and leadership or championing affect scientists' participation in academic entrepreneurship. This research appeared in journals including the Academy of Management Journal, Journal of Applied Psychology, Academy of Management Perspectives, Research Policy, Journal of Management, and Journal of Management Studies. He also extended his technology-transfer research to national and federal laboratories and public research institutes.

Another strand of Siegel's research concerns the strategic and economic implications of corporate social responsibility. In a 2000 article, Siegel and Abagail McWilliams argued that model misspecification could account for reported positive relationships between corporate social responsibility and financial performance, finding a neutral relationship after controlling for research and development spending. Their 2001 theory-of-the-firm article treated corporate social responsibility as a strategic, potentially profit-maximizing investment rather than solely as philanthropy, with social attributes priced into the market and the costs of providing them incorporated into firms' decisions. They later argued that firms could create sustainable competitive advantage by aligning corporate social responsibility with business- and corporate-level strategy. Other studies considered strategic corporate social responsibility and environmental sustainability, and market responses to endorsements of social responsibility. In a sole-authored article in Academy of Management Perspectives, Siegel argued that environmental initiatives must be economically viable if they are to be sustainable.

Siegel has also published on the economic effects of changes in corporate ownership, including mergers, acquisitions, divestitures, leveraged buyouts, and private-equity transactions. With Frank R. Lichtenberg of Columbia University, he investigated the effects of leveraged buyouts on productivity and other aspects of firm behavior. With Kenneth L. Simons, he examined the effects of mergers and acquisitions on firm performance, plant productivity, and workers using matched employer–employee data. Research with the late Mike Wright of Imperial College London and other co-authors examined whether private equity and related ownership changes could reduce agency costs and improve economic efficiency.

== Editorial roles ==
Siegel is a co-editor-in-chief of Small Business Economics: An Entrepreneurship Journal. He previously edited The Journal of Technology Transfer, Journal of Management Studies, and Academy of Management Perspectives. He has also served as an associate editor of the Journal of Productivity Analysis and formerly as an associate editor of the Journal of Business Venturing and Academy of Management Learning and Education. Don has also co-edited 59 special issues of leading journals in management and economics on technology transfer, academic entrepreneurship, and CSR.

== Honors and awards ==
Siegel was elected a Fellow of the Academy of Management (AOM) in 2016 and served as dean of the AOM Fellows from 2020 to 2023. In 2021, he was elected a Fellow of the American Association for the Advancement of Science. In December 2025, Arizona State University announced his appointment as a Regents Professor, its highest faculty honor, for 2026. In 2026, Siegel and Albert N. Link received the Global Award for Entrepreneurship Research for their research on technology transfer and innovative entrepreneurship
