= Johan Wiklund =

Swedish Economist and University Professor

- Born: June 12, 1962 (age 64); Sweden

Academic background
- Education: Jönköping International Business School
- Doctoral advisor: Per Davidsson

Academic work
- Discipline: Entrepreneurship
- Institutions: Syracuse University

Johan Wiklund is a Swedish scholar of entrepreneurship and currently holds the Al Berg Chair and Distinguished Professor of Entrepreneurship at the Whitman School of Management at Syracuse University, Professor Two at Nord University, Norway, visiting professor at University of Bath, UK and inaugural RMIT Fulbright Distinguished Chair in Entrepreneurship and Innovation in Australia. His research interests include entrepreneurship and mental health as well as the entry, performance, and exit of entrepreneurial firms. He is considered a leading authority in entrepreneurship research, with over 100 articles appearing in leading entrepreneurship and management journals.

He is the editor-in-chief of Entrepreneurship Theory and Practice, which was rated as a 4* journal by the Association of Business Schools (ABS) in 2024

== Early career ==
Wiklund received his PhD from Jönköping International Business School in 1998, with his doctoral thesis titled "Small Firm Growth and Performance: Entrepreneurship and Beyond", advised by Per Davidsson. He began his career at the Stockholm School of Economics and Jönköping International Business School before taking his current appointment at Syracuse University. During this time Wiklund focused primarily on entrepreneurial orientation and began his collaboration with Dean Shephard, both of whom have since been recognized for their influence within entrepreneurship research.

== Mental health, well-being and entrepreneurship ==
In 2014 Wiklund started developing his current research agenda, which focuses on mental health and entrepreneurship. This research has been covered by Psychology Today, Fast Company, and Entrepreneur, and has also been featured on podcasts. In addition to his own published works on this topic, he has organized workshops around the world and co-edited special issues in leading academic journals such as Academy of Management Perspectives and the Journal of Business Venturing.

== Selected honors and awards ==
- Fulbright Distinguished Professorship - The Fulbright Commission and RMIT University (2018)
- 2015 Greif Research Impact Award - Academy of Management Entrepreneurship Division (2015)
- Mentor Award - Academy of Management, Entrepreneurship Division (2011)
- Best Empirical Paper Award - Academy of Management, Entrepreneurship Division (2010)
- IDEA Research Promise Award - Academy of Management, Entrepreneurship Division (2010)
- Mentor Award - Academy of Management, Entrepreneurship Division (2010)
- Best Empirical Paper Award - Academy of Management, Entrepreneurship Division (2008)
