= Saras Sarasvathy =

American academic

Saras D. Sarasvathy
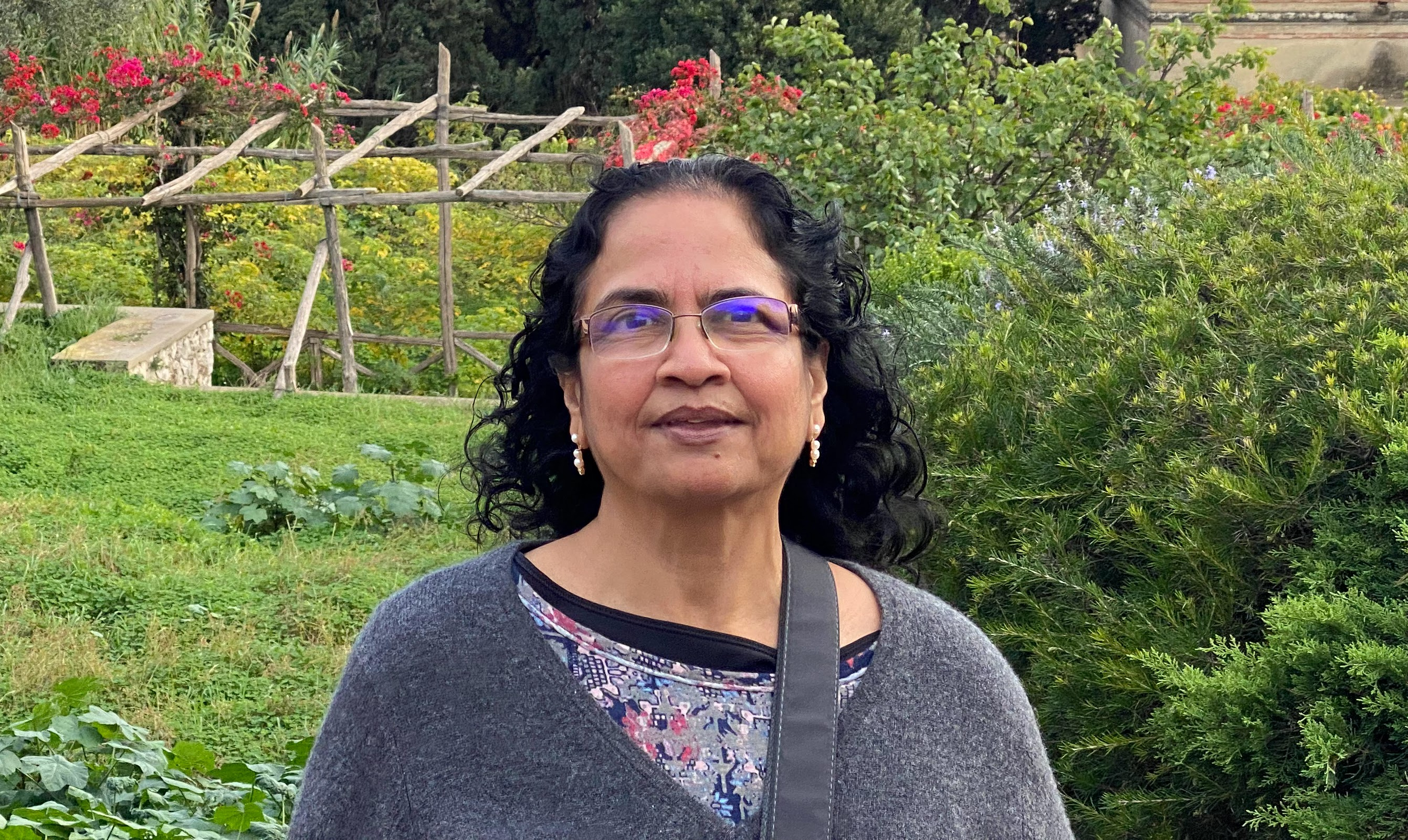
- Born: Mumbai, India
- Citizenship: American
- Education: (BCom) University of Mumbai (PhD) Carnegie Mellon University
- Occupations: Scholar and Professor
- Employer(s): University of Virginia; IIM Bangalore
- Scientific career
- Doctoral advisor: Herbert A. Simon

Saras D. Sarasvathy (born 1959) is an American entrepreneurship professor and recipient of the 2022 Global Award for Entrepreneurship Research. She is currently the Paul M. Hammaker Professor in Business Administration at the University of Virginia Darden School of Business and the Jamuna Raghavan Chair Professor in Entrepreneurship, Indian Institute of Management, Bangalore. She serves on the editorial boards or as associate editor of several academic journals as well as serving as an outside director to the public company LendingTree. She is best known for her conception of Effectuation, a theory of Entrepreneurial action based on the study of Expert Entrepreneurs. Her award-winning journal article - "Causation and Effectuation: Toward a Theoretical Shift from Economic Inevitability to Entrepreneurial Contingency" is one of the most highly cited academic articles about entrepreneurship of all time.

== Early life and education ==
=== Early life ===
Sarasvathy grew up in Mumbai. and received her BCom in statistics at the University of Bombay before embarking on a career of entrepreneurship.

=== Entrepreneurial Career ===
From 1980 to 1991 she founded or co-founded 5 different businesses on three different continents that included a restaurant and a manufacturing company. Her 5th business was destroyed by a flood leaving Sarasvathy without a company but motivated to more rigorously understand her chosen field of Entrepreneurship.

=== Education ===
In 1992 Sarasvathy was accepted to Carnegie Mellon Graduate School of Industrial Administration, graduating in 1994. In 1994 she was accepted into the PhD program for information systems at Carnegie Mellon University where her research was supervised by Nobel Laureate Herbert Simon, considered a pioneer in Artificial Intelligence. While at CMU Sarasvathy began her study of Entrepreneurship by writing her dissertation about the differences between how bankers and entrepreneurs view and manage risk, which resulted in her first article co-Authored with Herbert Simon.

== Academic career ==
Sarasvathy's study of expert entrepreneurs and their thinking process began while she was at CMU and would continue through the rest of her career. She was an assistant professor at University of Washington from 1998 to 2002 and then was an assistant professor at University of Maryland from 2002 to 2004. In 2004 Sarasvathy joined the faculty at University of Virginia's Darden School of Business as an associate professor. She is now the Paul Hammaker Professor of Business Administration at the University of Virginia Darden School of Business.

=== Introduction of Effectuation ===
Through her publications and research, Sarasvathy is known for her creation of Effectuation, a logic of Entrepreneurial Action, based on her studies of Expert Entrepreneurs. Named for its contrast to causal thinking, a tenet of managerial decision making, Effectual thinking or Effectuation is means-driven and eschews predictive thinking common in large companies. Together the five principles of Effectuation place an emphasis on taking action over planning. In 2011 Professor Sarasvathy and Effectuation were the subject of the cover article of Inc. Magazine and her article "What Makes Entrepreneurs Entrepreneurial?" was discovered by leading Venture Capitalist Vinod Khosla who called it "The first good paper I've seen".

Sarasvathy has published over 60 peer-reviewed articles in prestigious journals, such as Strategic Management Journal, The Academy of Management Review, Entrepreneurship Theory & Practice, Entrepreneurship and Regional Development, and the Journal of Business Venturing. She has also authored 8 books and over 36 book chapters.

In 2020 Effectuation was the subject of a special issue of the Small Business Economic Journal.

In 2022 Sarasvathy received the Global Award for Entrepreneurship Research, considered the top award for academic scholarship in Entrepreneurship and was also invited to give the 5th Herbert Simon Society lecture.

== Selected Honors and awards ==
- Global Award for Entrepreneurship Research, 2022
- Doctor of Humane Letters, Chalmers University, 2022
- Small Business Economics special issue about Effectuation, 2020
- Legacy Impact Award from Global Consortium of Entrepreneurship Centers, 2019
- Foundational Paper Award from Academy of Management, 2017
- Jubilee Professor of Entrepreneurship, Chalmers University, Gothenburg, Sweden, 2015
- Doctor of Humane Letters, Babson College, 2013
- Inc Magazine cover featured article, "How Great Entrepreneurs Think", 2011
- 6 Best Paper Awards from leading international conferences
- Invited keynote speaker at 72 international conferences and events

== Selected Books & Journal Articles ==
=== Books ===
Sarasvathy, S. D. 2021. 2nd Edition. Effectuation: Elements of Entrepreneurial Expertise. Edward Elgar, New Horizons in Entrepreneurship Series.

Sarasvathy, S. D., Venkataraman, S., and Dew, N. 2020 Shaping Entrepreneurship Research: Made, as well as found. Oxford, UK: Routledge.

Read, S., Sarasvathy, S. D., Dew, N., and Wiltbank, R. 2016. 2nd Edition. Effectual Entrepreneurship 2nd Edition. Oxford, UK: Routledge

Read, S., Sarasvathy, S. D., Dew, N., Wiltbank, R. and Ohlsson, A.V. 2011. Effectual Entrepreneurship. Oxford, UK: Routledge (Translated into Portuguese, Dutch, French, Russian, Japanese and Chinese. Won the gold medal in 2012 Axiom Business Book Awards)

Sarasvathy, S. D. 2008. Effectuation: Elements of Entrepreneurial Expertise. Edward Elgar, New Horizons in Entrepreneurship Series. (Nominated for the 2009 Terry Book Award, Academy of Management and translated into Chinese, Japanese and Russian)

=== Most Cited Journal Articles ===
1. Sarasvathy, S. D. (2001). Causation and effectuation: Toward a theoretical shift from economic inevitability to entrepreneurial contingency. Academy of management Review, 26(2), 243–263.
2. Dew, N., Read, S., Sarasvathy, S. D., & Wiltbank, R. (2009). Effectual versus predictive logics in entrepreneurial decision-making: Differences between experts and novices. Journal of business venturing, 24(4), 287–309.
3. Wiltbank, R., Dew, N., Read, S., & Sarasvathy, S. D. (2006). What to do next? The case for non-predictive strategy. Strategic management journal, 27(10), 981–998.
4. Sarasvathy, S. D., & Dew, N. (2005). New market creation through transformation.Journal of evolutionary economics, 15, 533–565.
5. Read, S., Dew, N., Sarasvathy, S. D., Song, M., & Wiltbank, R. (2009). Marketing Under Uncertainty: The Logic of an Effectual Approach. Journal of marketing, 73(3), 1–18.

Source: Retrieved from Scopus

=== Recently Published Journal Articles ===
1. Sarasvathy, S., & Botha, H. (2022). Bringing People to the Table in New Ventures: An Effectual Approach. Negotiation Journal, 38(1), 11–34.
2. Sarasvathy, S. D. (2021). The Middle Class of Business: Endurance as a Dependent Variable in Entrepreneurship. Entrepreneurship Theory and Practice, 45(5), 1054–1082.
3. Mauer, R., Nieschke, S., & Sarasvathy, S. D. (2021). Gestation in new technology ventures: Causal brakes and effectual pedals. Journal of Small Business Management, 1-36.
4. Sarasvathy, S. D. (2022). An Effectual Analysis of Markets and States. Questioning the Entrepreneurial State, 37.
5. Chowdhury, R., Sarasvathy, S. D., & Freeman, R. E. (2022). Toward a Theory of Marginalized Stakeholder-Centric Entrepreneurship. Business Ethics Quarterly, 1-34.

Source: Retrieved from Scopus
