= Per Davidsson =

Professor of entrepreneurship (born 1958)

Per Davidsson (born 5 April 1958) is an entrepreneurship professor that holds Swedish and Australian citizenship. He is currently a professor of entrepreneurship at Jönköping International Business School and Queensland University of Technology Business School where he served as the Talbot Family Foundation Chair in Entrepreneurship and Founding Director of the Australian Centre for Entrepreneurship Research (ACE) during 2010–2018. He serves on the editorial boards for several journals and has participated in many research programs including the Comprehensive Australian Study of Entrepreneurial Emergence. On March 22, 2023, he was named the 2023 recipient of the Global Award for Entrepreneurship Research.

== Early life and career ==
Davidsson grew up in Sandviken, a small, one-employer steel town in Sweden. He received his BA in Business Administration in 1984, his MSc. in 1987 and his PhD in Economic Psychology in 1989 at Stockholm School of Economics. In 1990 he moved to Umeå University, where he got involved in an international-collaborative project with the entrepreneurship academics David Storey and Paul Reynolds, which ignited his international career. In 1994, he moved to take part in the start-up of Jönköping International Business School (JIBS) to start a high-class business school with an entrepreneurship focus. During this time, Davidsson played a significant role in the creation of a strong research environment within JIBS; it has been identified as second in the world in entrepreneurship and first in Scandinavia in business research.

Throughout his career, Davidsson has served as professor in Sweden and Australia and held academic side appointments in North America, South America, and Asia. He has served as editor and reviewer in high-profile scientific journals. In 1992 his first research leadership role was as Director of the Transportation Research Unit at Umeå University. At JIBS he served as Head of the Entrepreneurship, Marketing and Management Department and led the PEG (Program on Entrepreneurship and SMEs) research program. At QUT he was the founding director of the Australian Centre for Entrepreneurship Research (ACE).

Through his publications and research, Davidsson is known for his research on nascent entrepreneurship; start-up processes; small firm growth; and more recently 'external enablement' of entrepreneurial action and success. He has published over 90 peer-reviewed articles in prestigious journals, such as Strategic Management Journal, Regional Studies, Journal of Management Studies, Entrepreneurship Theory & Practice, Entrepreneurship and Regional Development, and Journal of Business Venturing.

== Honors and awards ==
1. Recipient of the 2023 Global Award for Entrepreneurship Research. "For his role as a pioneer of influential and high-quality research contributions and as a community builder in the entrepreneurship field."
2. Recipient of the 2021 Karl Vesper Entrepreneurship Pioneer Award for demonstrating "the entrepreneurial spirit in overcoming obstacles while implementing significant contributions that have been instrumental in the ongoing development of entrepreneurship as a field of study and research."
3. Dr. rer. pol h.c, Leuphana University, Germany (honorary doctorate), 2013
4. Recipient of the "Mentor Award" from the 3,000 member strong Entrepreneurship Division of the Academy of Management, 2013
5. Member-elected Chair of the primary professional association, The Entrepreneurship Division (ENT) of the Academy Management (AoM), (2010/2011, as part of a 5-year service leadership cycle)
6. Greif Research Impact Award for most Impactful Entrepreneurship Article Published in 2003 (w. Benson Honig), 2009
7. The 2009 Journal of Business Venturing Award for most Impactful Article published in 2003 (w. Benson Honig)
8. Journal of Management Studies Best Paper Prize, 2006 (w. Shaker Zahra & Harry Sapienza)
9. Inducted into 21st Century Entrepreneurship Research Fellows, a select group of 15 scholars established by the Global Consortium of Entrepreneurship Centres to advance entrepreneurship research worldwide, 2017
1. Invited keynote speaker at 32 international conferences

== Selected articles ==
Data below is received from Scopus

=== Most cited ===
1. The role of social and human capital among nascent entrepreneurs, 2003
2. Entrepreneurship and dynamic capabilities: A review, model and research agenda, 2006
3. Arriving at the high-growth firm, 2003
4. Researching Entrepreneurship: Conceptualization and Design. New York: Springer.
5. Where do they come from? prevalence and characteristics of nascent entrepreneurs, 2000

=== Recently published ===
1. Steffens, P., Baker, T., Davidsson, P. & Senyard, J. (2023). When is less more? Boundary conditions of effective entrepreneurial bricolage. Journal of Management, 49(4), 1277–1311
2. Davidsson, P. (2023). Ditching discovery-creation for unified venture creation research. Entrepreneurship Theory and Practice, 47(2) 594–612.
3. Davidsson, P., Grégoire, D., & Lex, M. (2021). Venture idea assessment (VIA): Development of a needed concept, measure, and research agenda. Journal of Business Venturing, 36(5).
4. Kimjeon, J. & Davidsson, P. (2021). External enablers of entrepreneurship: A review and agenda for accumulation of strategically actionable knowledge. Entrepreneurship Theory and Practice.
5. Davidsson, P. & J. Grünhagen, J.H. (2021). Fulfilling the process promise: A review and agenda for new venture creation process research. Entrepreneurship Theory and Practice, 45(5) 1083–1118.
6. Davidsson, P., Recker, J. & von Briel, F. (2020). External enablement of new venture creation: A framework. Academy of Management Perspectives, 34(3), 311–332.
7. von Briel, F., Davidsson, P., & Recker, J. (2018). Digital technologies as external enablers of new venture creation in the IT hardware sector. Entrepreneurship Theory and Practice, 42(1), 47–69.
