= Shaker Zahra =

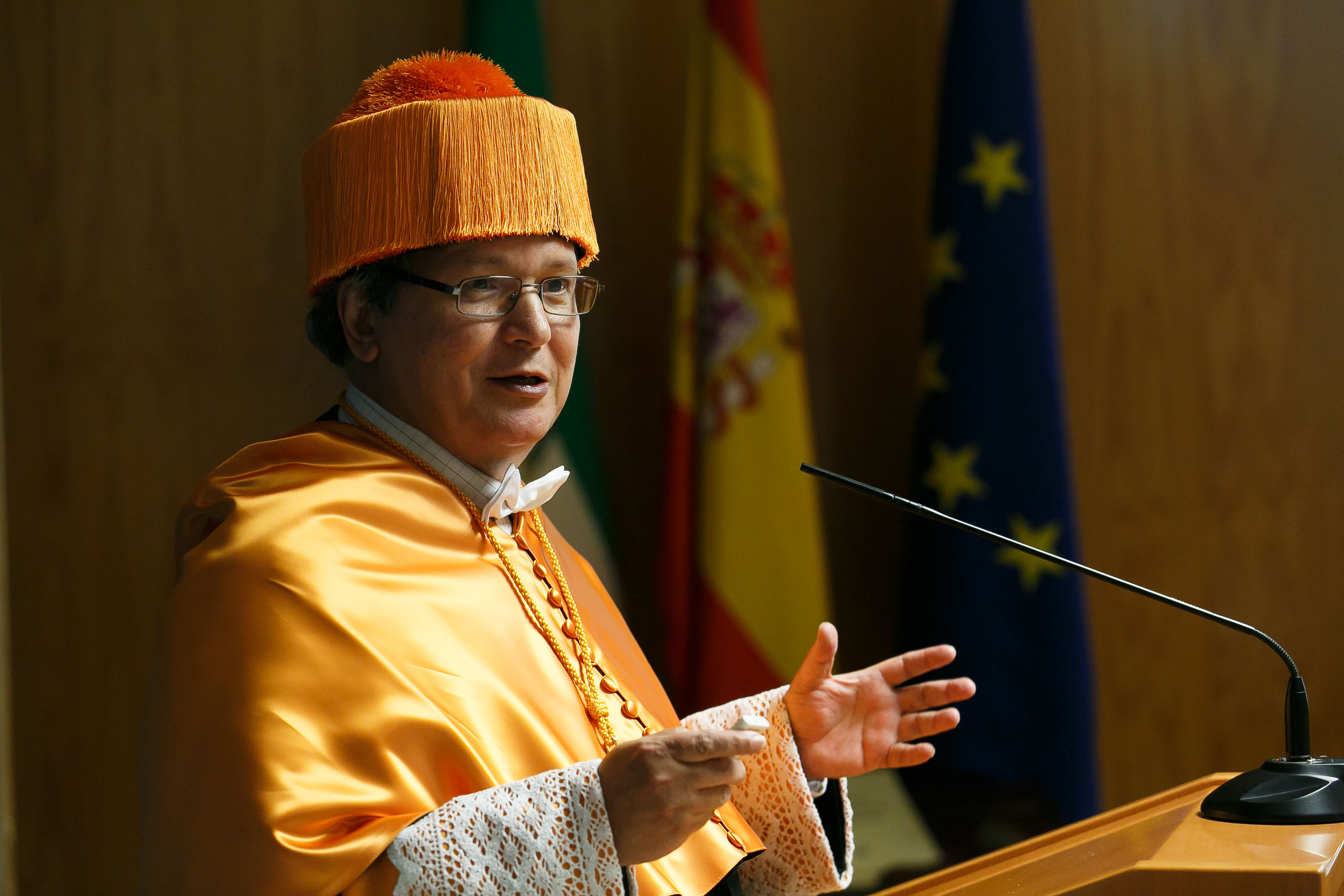
Shaker A. Zahra, Doctor Honoris Causa

Shaker A. Zahra is the Robert E. Buuck Chair of Entrepreneurship and professor of strategy and entrepreneurship, Carlson School of Management, University of Minnesota. He is also the academic director of the Gary S. Holmes Entrepreneurship Center.

Previously, he was Paul T. Babson Distinguished Professor of Entrepreneurship at Babson College, professor of strategy and entrepreneurship at Georgia State University, associate professor of strategy at George Mason University, and assistant professor of management at Old Dominion University. He has also held the 3TU Chair in international entrepreneurship at the University of Twente in the Netherlands.

His research connects entrepreneurship, internationalization, strategy, and technology management. He has served on the editorial boards of more than 25 professional journals. He has received Best Paper honors from numerous journals, as well as teaching awards including Best Teacher in the MBA program and a mentorship award. He has been the keynote speaker for more than 40 conferences and conventions, and serves as a consultant to multiple technology-based companies.

== Research focus ==
In his research, Zahra examines: entrepreneurship & national policy in global tech-based industries; international entrepreneurship; corporate entrepreneurship & knowledge creation, absorption & conversion; and entrepreneurship knowledge and capability development in nascent global industries.

== Sample research recognition ==
Zahra has received several grants, honors and awards, including 3 honorary Ph.D. degrees from the Stockholm School of Economics, Jönköping International Business School, and Ghent University. He is the 2014 winner of the Global Award for Entrepreneurship Research, 21st Century Research Fellow of the National Consortium of Entrepreneurship Centers, Fellow of the Southern Management Association, Fellow of the International Family Enterprise Association, and the Raymond Institute for Family Business.

== Ongoing research ==
Zahra's ongoing research focuses on: robotics, software applications, global mobile applications, video games, pharma, and nano-technology. Besides his research in the US, Zahra has research projects under way in several countries that include: China, Swaziland, Brazil, India, Morocco, Korea, Sweden, Denmark, Italy, and Spain. These studies make use of multiple methods and theory; they also cover multiple levels of the analysis.

== Academic leadership ==
Zahra has served on over 25 journal editorial boards as well as a track chair for: Decision Sciences Institute, Academy of International Business, and Southern Management Association (3 times). He has also served as the director of the Babson Kauffman Entrepreneurship Research Conference and as the chair of the Entrepreneurship Division of the Academy of Management. He has also served as a keynote speaker for over 40 conferences in the US and other countries.

== Teaching and outreach ==
Zahra has taught undergraduate, MBA, EMBA, and executive programs at Minnesota, Babson, Georgia State, and Georgia Tech, among several others. He has also taught in several company-sponsored executive education and customized-MBA programs.

Zahra has been a consultant to several prominent companies and organizations in the US and other countries. His clients include some of the world's largest global technology-based companies.

In addition, Zahra has taught at several DBA, Executive Doctorate and Ph.D. programs in the US and other countries (advising/chairing or serving on over 75 Ph.D. students).

Zahra received several awards for his excellent teaching, including the Best Teacher in the MBA and the Mentor Award from the Entrepreneurship Division, the Academy of Management.

== Sample publications ==
Zahra's research has appeared in journals that include the Academy of Management Journal, Academy of Management Review, Academy of Management Executive, Strategic Management Journal, Journal of Management, Organization Science, Journal of International Business Studies, Journal of Management Studies, Journal of Business Venturing, Journal of Organizational Behavior, Decision Sciences, Information Systems Research, Industrial & Corporate Change, Research Policy, Human Relations, Academy of Management Perspectives, and Academy of Management Learning, among others. Zahra has also published or (co)edited 12 books and conference proceedings.

- Foss NJ, Lyngsie J, Zahra SA (2013). "The role of external knowledge sources and organizational design in the process of opportunity exploitation". Strategic Management Journal. 34 (12): 1453–1471. doi:10.1002/smj.2135. hdl:10398/8680. S2CID 167037762.
- Larrañeta B, Zahra SA, Galán González JL (2013). "Strategic repertoire variety and new venture growth: The moderating effects of origin and industry dynamism". Strategic Management Journal. 35 (5): 761–772. doi:10.1002/smj.2103.
- Maula MV, Keil T, Zahra SA (2012). "Top Management's Attention to Discontinuous Technological Change: Corporate Venture Capital as an Alert Mechanism". Organization Science. 24 (3): 926–947. doi:10.1287/orsc.1120.0775. S2CID 207244288.
- Surroca J, Tribó JA, Zahra SA (2012). "Stakeholder Pressure on MNEs and the Transfer of Socially Irresponsible Practices to Subsidiaries". Academy of Management Journal. 56 (2): 549–572. doi:10.5465/amj.2010.0962.
- Shaker AZ, Rawhouser HN, Bhawe N, Neubaum DO, Hayton JC (2008). "Globalization of social entrepreneurship opportunities". Strategic Entrepreneurship Journal. 2 (2): 117–131. doi:10.1002/sej.43.
- Uotila J, Maula M, Keil T, Zahra SA (2008). "Exploration, exploitation, and financial performance: analysis of S&P 500 corporations" (PDF). Strategic Management Journal. 30 (2): 221–231. doi:10.1002/smj.738.
- Zahra SA, Gedajlovic E, Neubaum DO, Shulman JM (2008). "A typology of social entrepreneurs: Motives, search processes and ethical challenges". Journal of Business Venturing. 24 (5): 519–532. doi:10.1016/j.jbusvent.2008.04.007.
- Keil T, Maula M, Schildt H, Zahra SA (2008). "The Effect of Governance Modes and Relatedness of External Business Development Activities on Innovative Performance". Strategic Management Journal. 29 (8): 895–907. doi:10.1002/smj.672.

"Knowledge Conversion Capability and the Performance of Corporate and University Spin-Offs," S. Zahra, Van de Velde & Larraneta, Industrial and Corporate Change (2007).

"The Survival of International New Ventures," R. Mudambi & S. Zahra, JIBS (2007).

"Entrepreneurship and Dynamic Capabilities: A Review, Model, and Research Agenda," S. Zahra, H. Sapienza & P. Davidsson, Journal of Management Studies (2006).

"The Effect of Early Internationalization on Firm Profitability and Growth," H. Sapienza, E. Autio, G. George & S. Zahra, AMR(2006).

"A Theory on International New Ventures: A Decade of Research," S. Zahra, JIBS (2005).

"Management Fraud: Antecedents and Consequences," S. Zahra, A. Rasheed & R. Priem, Journal of Management (2005).

"Absorptive Capacity: A Review, Reconceptualization, and Extension," S. Zahra & G. George, AMR (2002).

"Sources of Capabilities, Integration, and Technology Commercialization," S. Zahra & A. P. Nielsen, SMJ (2002).

"Privatization and Entrepreneurial Transformation: A Review and Research Agenda," Zahra, Ireland, Guiterrez & Hitt, AMR (2000).

"International Expansion, Technological Learning, and New Venture Performance," S. Zahra, D. Ireland & M. Hitt, AMJ (2000).

"Entrepreneurship in Medium-Size Companies: Exploring the Effects of Ownership and Governance Systems," S. Zahra, D. Neubaum & M. Huse, Journal of Management (2000).
