= Pramodita Sharma =

Canadian business academic

Academic background
- Education: University of Calgary

Academic work
- Discipline: Business studies
- Institutions: University of Vermont

Pramodita Sharma is a business academic. She is a university distinguished professor and the Schlesinger-Grossman Chair of Family Business at the Grossman School of Business (GSB), University of Vermont. Sharma was editor-in-chief of the Family Business Review.

== Education ==
Sharma completed a Ph.D. at the University of Calgary. Her 1997 dissertation was titled Determinants of the satisfaction of the primary stakeholders with the succession process in family firms. James J. Chrisman was her doctoral advisor. Sharma is married to Sanjay Sharma. Both Sharma and her husband independently won the National Federation of Independent Business dissertation award for outstanding research in the entrepreneurship-independent business category.

== Career ==
Sharma is a professor and the Schlesinger-Grossman Chair of Family Business at the Grossman School of Business (GSB), University of Vermont. She is a visiting professor at Kellogg School of Management and a senior research fellow at the Indian School of Business. She was editor-in-chief of the Family Business Review.

Sharma researches succession, governance, and innovation in family businesses. She also investigates how family business decisions are impacted by spirituality, philanthropy, and sustainability.

== Awards and honors ==
Sharma holds honorary doctorates at Jönköping University and Martin Luther University of Halle-Wittenberg.

== Selected works ==
- Sharma, Pramodita; Chrisman, James J.; Chua, Jess H., eds. (1996). A Review and Annotated Bibliography of Family Business Studies. Springer US. ISBN 978-0-7923-9783-0. OCLC 853266880.
- Hoy, Frank; Sharma, Pramodita (2010). Entrepreneurial Family Firms. Prentice Hall. ISBN 978-0-13-157711-4.
- Melin, Leif; Nordqvist, Mattias; Sharma, Pramodita, eds. (2014). The Sage Handbook of Family Business. Sage. ISBN 978-1-4462-6593-2.
- Sharma, Pramodita; Auletta, Nunzia; DeWitt, Rocki-Lee; Parada, Maria José; Yusof, Mohar, eds. (2015). Developing Next Generation Leaders for Transgenerational Entrepreneurial Family Enterprises. Edward Elgar Publishing. ISBN 978-1-78471-787-2.
- Cohen, Allan; Sharma, Pramodita (2016). Entrepreneurs in Every Generation: How Successful Family Businesses Develop Their Next Leaders. Berrett-Koehler Publishers. ISBN 978-1-62656-167-0.
- Sharma, Sanjay; Sharma, Pramodita (2019). Patient Capital. Cambridge University Press. ISBN 978-1-107-12366-3.
- Sharma, Pramodita; Sharma, Sanjay, eds. (2021). Pioneering Family Firms' Sustainable Development Strategies. Edward Elgar Publishing. ISBN 978-1-78990-442-0.
