= Anne Huff =

German academic

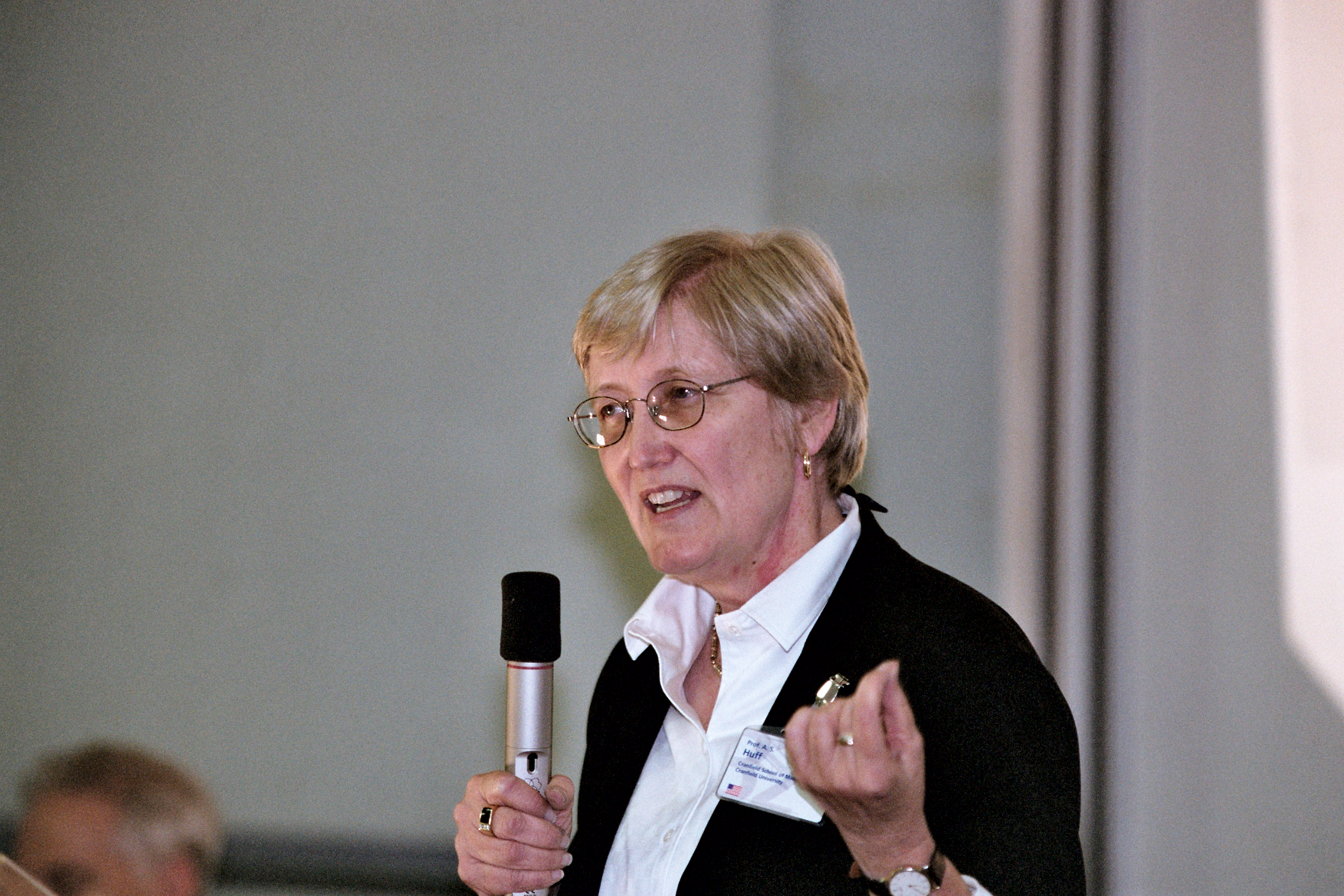
Image of Anne Huff

Anne Sigismund Huff is an academic who is a Permanent Visiting Professor of Strategy and Innovation at TUM School of Management. She was the Founding Director of the Advanced Institute of Management Research, based at the London Business School. She has written over 99 publications.

== Career ==
Huff achieved a Bachelor of Arts degree in Philosophy from Barnard College and earned her Master of Arts (Sociology) and Ph.D. (Management) from Northwestern University. She was a Visiting Professor in the Communication Department at the University of Colorado. She also worked as professor at Dublin City University in their business school. She has taught at the University of Illinois. She has been a Professor of Strategy and Research Development at Maynooth University since 2011.

== Awards and honors ==
During 1998–1999, Huff served as President of the Academy of Management. In August 2023, Huff was honored with the Distinguished Scholar Award from the Managerial and Organizational Cognition Division of the Academy of Management.

Huff received an honorary doctorate from Jönköping University in Sweden in 2008.

== Selected publications ==
- Huff, Anne, ed. (1990). Mapping Strategic Thought. Wiley.
- Huff, Anne (1999). Writing for Scholarly Publication. Sage.
- Huff, Anne; Huff, James; Barr, Pamela (2000). When Firms Change Direction. Oxford University Press.
- Huff, Anne; Jenkins, Mark, eds. (2002). Mapping Strategic Knowledge. Sage.
- Huff, Anne (2008). Designing Research for Publication. Sage.
