= Bernard Hibbitts =

Canadian legal scholar

Bernard Hibbitts is a Canadian legal scholar, academic entrepreneur, editor and publisher currently teaching in the United States at the University of Pittsburgh School of Law. Trained as a legal historian, his early work focused on the historical relationship between law, technology and the senses. In the mid-1990s he wrote a series of controversial articles on the future of law reviews and scholarly publishing in the then-just-emerging age of the Internet. He is best known today as the founder, publisher & Editor-in-Chief of JURIST, the Webby award-winning online legal news service he created in 1996 that is now powered by a volunteer team of over 80 students from 29 law schools in the US, the UK, continental Europe, Kenya, Mauritius, Australia and New Zealand. He is Chairman of the Board of Directors of JURIST Legal News and Research Services, Inc., the 501(c)(3) non-profit corporation he organized to operate JURIST in 2008.

Hibbitts is a Rhodes Scholar (Maritimes, 1981) and a former law clerk at the Supreme Court of Canada for the late Justice Gerald Le Dain, whom he served from 1984-85 after his original employer, Chief Justice Bora Laskin, died in office. He is a graduate in law of University College, Oxford (B.A. Jurisprudence 1983), Dalhousie University (LL.B. 1984), the University of Toronto (LL.M. 1986), and the Harvard Law School (LL.M. 1988), where he was an associate editor of the Harvard International Law Journal. He also holds a B.A. in Political Science (1980) from Dalhousie University and the University of King's College in Halifax, Canada, where he received the Governor General's Medal and the Eric Dennis Gold Medal in Political Science, and an M.A. in International Affairs (1981) from the Norman Paterson School of International Affairs at Carleton University in Ottawa, Canada.
