= Global Award for Entrepreneurship Research =

International entrepreneurship research award

The Global Award for Entrepreneurship Research
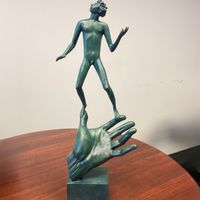
- The Hand of God
- Awarded for: Outstanding contributions to research in Entrepreneurship
- Sponsored by: Swedish Foundation for Small Business Research (FSF) and the Swedish Agency for Economic and Regional Growth (Nutek)
- Reward: €100,000
- First award: 1996; 30 years ago
- Final award: 2023
- Website: www.e-award.org

The Global Award for Entrepreneurship Research is an international award that recognizes outstanding contributions to the field of entrepreneurship research. Established in 1996, it aims to promote the advancement of knowledge in entrepreneurship and to encourage research efforts in the field.

== The Prize ==
The recipient of the Global Award for Entrepreneurship Research is awarded a prize sum of 100,000 Euros. Recipients also receive a reproduction of Swedish Sculptor Carl Milles' The Hand of God.

== The History of the Award ==
During the Internal Conference for Small Business's World Conference in 1996, a proposal was made to create an award to recognize excellence in research in the field of entrepreneurship and small business. The award aimed to emphasize the importance of entrepreneurship research, stimulate and promote further research in the field, and disseminate state-of-the-art research among scholars, practitioners, and small business developers. The International Award for Entrepreneurship and Small Business Research was established in that same year in 1996. In 2008 the award was renamed the Global Award for Entrepreneurship Research, and the monetary prize was increased in value to €100,000.

== Award Process and Selection ==
The Global Award for Entrepreneurship Research has been considered the premier prize in its field. The award is presented annually with a ceremony typically held in Stockholm with the award being presented by the Minister of Sweden's Ministry of Enterprise and Education. The current awardee presents a prize lecture after receiving the award.

The Global Award for Entrepreneurship Research recognizes individuals who have made outstanding contributions to the field of entrepreneurship and small business development. The primary criterion for receiving the award is exceptional scientific achievement in entrepreneurship theory, methodology, and/or empirical research. The evaluation considers the following aspects:

1. The originality and innovativeness of the research.
2. The impact of the research on the scientific community and the advancement of entrepreneurship as a field of study.
3. The practical relevance of the research for policymakers, educators, and practitioners in the field of entrepreneurship.

Each year, leading entrepreneurship scholars worldwide are invited to nominate candidates. A Prize Committee, consisting of six to eight members who are full professors at Swedish universities working on small business and entrepreneurship issues, selects the winner.

== Award Founders ==
The award was founded two non-profit research organizations, the Swedish Entrepreneurship Forum and the Research Institute of Industrial Economics (IFN) Vinnova, the Swedish governmental agency responsible for promoting innovation was added later as an award sponsor.

== List of Global Award for Entrepreneurship recipients ==
Year	Award Recipient	Affiliation (when awarded)
2026	Albert Link & Donald Siegel	University of North Carolina & Arizona State University
2025	Dean Shepherd	University of Notre Dame
2024	Michael Frese & Robert Baron	Asia School of Business & Oklahoma State University
2023	Per Davidsson	Queensland University of Technology
2022	Saras Sarasvathy	University of Virginia Darden School of Business
2021	Cancelled	N/A
2020	John Haltiwanger	University of Maryland, College Park
2019	Boyan Jovanovic	New York University
2018	Olav Sorenson	Yale University
2017	Hernando de Soto	Institute for Liberty and Democracy
2016	Philippe Aghion	Collège de France
2015	Sidney G. Winter	Wharton School of the University of Pennsylvania
2014	Shaker Zahra	University of Minnesota
2013	Mary Ann Feldman	University of North Carolina at Chapel Hill
2012	Kathleen Eisenhardt	Stanford University
2011	Steven Klepper	Carnegie Mellon University
2010	Josh Lerner	Harvard University
2009	Scott Shane	Case Western Reserve University
2008	Bengt Johannison	Växjö University
2007	The Diana Group, creators of The Diana Project (Candida Brush, Nancy Carter, Elizabeth Gatewood, Patricia Green, Myra Hart)	Babson College
2006	Israel Kirzner	New York University
2005	William Gartner	Clemson University
2004	Paul Reynolds	Babson College
2003	William J. Baumol	New York University
2002	Giacomo Becattini & Charles Sabel	University of Florence & Columbia University
2001	Zoltan Acs & David B. Audretsch	University of Baltimore & Indiana University Bloomington
2000	Howard E. Aldrich	University of North Carolina at Chapel Hill
1999	Ian MacMillan	Wharton School of the University of Pennsylvania
1998	David Storey	University of Warwick
1997	Arnold C. Cooper	Purdue University
1996	David L. Birch	Massachusetts Institute of Technology
