= Karl-Erik Wärneryd =

Swedish economist (1927–2019)

- Born: December 20, 1927; Edsvära, Västergötland, Sweden
- Died: August 14, 2019 (aged 91)
- Organization: Stockholm School of Economics

Academic background
- Education: University of Chicago
- Thesis: A Study of Stimulus Generalization as Related to Discrimination and Stimulus Similarity (1955)

Academic work
- Discipline: Behavioral economics
- Notable students: Per Davidsson

Karl-Erik Wärneryd (December 20, 1927 – August 14, 2019) was a Swedish economist and expert in behavioral economics. He was a professor at the Stockholm School of Economics from 1963 until his retirement in 1992. He was a co-founder of the International Association for Research in Economic Psychology (IAREP).
