= Hero Company Theory =

Theory in economics

The Hero Company Theory, based on the work of economist Steven Klepper (1949 – 2013), who studied the phenomenon of economic agglomeration in Detroit during the automobile boom and Silicon Valley during the semiconductor boom. Klepper said that business ecosystems are best developed through the impact of "Hero Companies" which he described as high-growth businesses that achieve a substantial and sustainable impact and incubate talent, ideas, and most importantly, spinoffs. This theory posits that the spinoff process is the most effective method to spur dynamic hubs of growth, innovation, and wealth generation. This theory was originally developed in reference to the automobile industry in the U.S. city of Detroit and then applied to the technology industry in Silicon Valley.

== Detroit ==
Published in 2001, Klepper's study, “The Evolution of the U.S. Automobile Industry and Detroit as its Capital,” outlines the theory of regional concentration. He states that “better performing firms will have more and better spinoffs, and spinoffs will generally locate close to their parents. Hence if the earliest entrants in the Detroit area were unusually successful, this could start a cascading spinoff process in the Detroit area contributing to a growing concentration of the industry around Detroit.” Klepper examined a total of 725 companies that were founded in the automobile industry from 1895 to 1966. He categorized these companies into three different cohorts, based on when they entered the market, and divided them into four categories based on key characteristics.

Table 1.1 Cohort - Automobile industry
Cohort (Year of Entry)	Number of Companies
First cohort (1896-1904)	219
Second cohort (1905-1909)	271
Third cohort (1910-1966)	235
Total	725

Cohort (Key Characteristics)	Number of Companies
Experienced firms: Entered automobiles from another business	120
Experienced entrepreneurs: >1 founder was head of active firm	108
Spinoffs: >1 founder worked for or founded firm	145
Inexperienced firms: Residual category	352
Total	725

== Silicon Valley ==
Despite several economists theorizing that Silicon Valley presented a new phenomenon, Klepper argues that Silicon Valley Hero Companies follow a similar model to Detroit. Published in 2008, Klepper's paper “Silicon Valley, A Chip Off the Old Detroit Bloc” posits that Fairchild’s extraordinary spinoff rate was the driving force behind the economic agglomeration of the region. Klepper writes, “A fundamental shift in technology, to internal combustion engines in autos and silicon in semiconductors, opened up opportunities for new entrants, and pioneers entered in Detroit and Silicon Valley. These pioneers unleashed a reproductive process in which better firms spawned more and better spinoffs...With spinoffs not moving far from their geographic origins, the result was a proliferation of top firms around the original pioneers…Once this process got going, it appears to have been self-reinforcing, with firms of all qualities being more likely to spawn spinoffs in Detroit and Silicon Valley than elsewhere.” From 1957 to 1986, greater than 100 firms entered the semiconductor industry in Silicon Valley and nearly all of them were spinoffs. Together they constituted nearly 50% of the global market and the Silicon Valley population doubled from >600,000 in 1960 to >1,200,000 in 1980. Fairchild specifically stood out as the progenitor of 24 spinoffs; National, Intel, and Signetics (all spinoffs from Fairchild) accounted for 20 additional spinoffs.
