= William Gartner =

American professor (born 1953)

William B. Gartner
- Born: William B. Gartner
- Education: University of Washington
- Occupation: Professor
- Employer: Babson College
- Title: Bertarelli Distinguished Professor of Family Entrepreneurship

William B. Gartner (born 1953 in Richland (WA)) is an American Professor of entrepreneurship. He is known for his research on new venture creation and entrepreneurial behavior, for which he has received several awards, including the Heizer Doctoral Dissertation Award and the FSFNUTEK International Award for Entrepreneurship and Small Business Research (today known as the Global award for Entrepreneurship Research). Gartner was one of the pioneering entrepreneurship research scholars in the 1980s, when there was a shift of focus in the field from studying the individual traits of the entrepreneur to regarding entrepreneurship as a behavioral process.

== Career ==
William Gartner studied Business Administration at the University of Washington and obtained his master's degree, with a major in Business Policy, in 1977. He then worked in the engineering corps of the US army and at The Hertz Corporation, before returning to Washington University to pursue an academic career. Gartner finished his doctoral studies in 1982, and received a Ph.D. in Business Administration. Since the 1980s, William Gartner has worked at a number of universities in the US and a few in Europe. In the period 1985-1986, he was chair of the Academy of Management Entrepreneurship interest group, which later became the Entrepreneurship Division. Today William Gartner holds a joint professorship at Babson College (Wellesley, MA, USA) and Linnaeus University (Vaxjo, Sweden). In November 2017, Babson College announced the appointment of Gartner as Bertarelli Foundation Distinguished Professor of Family Entrepreneurship.

== Research ==
In the late 1980s William B. Gartner was one of the first researchers who argued for a different approach to entrepreneurship research. At that time, many scholars focused on the personality of the entrepreneur, trying to find personal attributes or skills common to all entrepreneurs. In his 1988 article, Who is the entrepreneur? Is the wrong question, Gartner argues against the above-mentioned approach, which he calls the “trait approach”. Instead he suggests that researchers should use a “behavioral approach”, focusing on the creation of new organizations and what the entrepreneur does, not who he or she is. During the 1990s Gartner collaborated with several fellow researchers on different projects. His main focus was now more practically oriented than before, generating evidence and insights into the process of how entrepreneurs create organizations. Among other things, he studied the behavior of entrepreneurs and the effect it had on the success of their new business ventures. Since the turn of the new millennium, Gartner has explored how entrepreneurship researchers’ theories, and the language they use, fit the way actual entrepreneurs think and talk. He has also examined new ways of understanding entrepreneurship, advocating the value of narrative methods. In 2013, Gartner received the Academy of Management's Entrepreneurship Division Foundational Paper Award for the 1988 paper “Properties of Emerging Organizations.”, which he co-authored with fellow entrepreneurship professor Jerome Katz.
