= Simple Rules =

Simple Rules: How to Thrive in a Complex World
- Author: Donald N. Sull; Kathleen M. Eisenhardt
- Language: English
- Publisher: Houghton Mifflin Harcourt
- Publication date: 2015
- Publication place: United States
- Pages: 280
- ISBN: 9780544409903

Simple Rules: How to Thrive in a Complex World is a 2015 business strategy book co-authored by Donald N. Sull, a senior lecturer at the MIT Sloan School of Management, and Kathleen M. Eisenhardt, a professor at the Stanford University School of Engineering.

== Content ==
Sull and Eisenhardt suggest that a limited set of simple rules must be applied to solve specific problems in complex situations. This thesis, which emphasizes "short cut strategies", is the best way for businesses to solve problems. The book illustrates this with many case studies, ranging "from medical care to college football to complexity theory."

== Critical reception ==
A review in the Sydney Morning Herald suggested the book was "neither a silver bullet nor a self-help book. It mentions how the authors acknowledge that companies like Netflix that use simple rules are also guided by large amounts of sophisticated analytics.
