= Erik E. Lehmann =

German economist

Academic background
- Education: University of Rostock

Academic work
- Discipline: Management and Organization
- Institutions: University of Augsburg
- Website: Information at IDEAS / RePEc

Erik E. Lehmann (born 1963) is a German economist. He is a professor of Management and Organization at University of Augsburg and Director of the CisAlpino Institute of Comparative Studies in Europe (CCSE), University of Augsburg and University of Bergamo, Italy. Beyond, Lehmann is a visiting professor at University of Bergamo, an adjunct professor at Indiana University Bloomington, USA, co-director of the Augsburg Center for Entrepreneurship (ACE), and a board member of the Bavarian America Academy (BAA) in Munich. He has been highly cited on his publications on entrepreneurship, with 11 authored or co-authored papers each cited over 100 times.

== Academic career ==
Erik E. Lehmann started his academic career as a student research assistant at University of Erlangen-Nuremberg (1990–1994). After earning his Ph.D. as a research assistant at University of Rostock (1994–1999), he became an assistant professor at University of Konstanz (1999–2004), where he achieved his Habilitation and Venia Legendi in Business, May 2005. From June to December 2002, he was a visiting scholar at the Institute of Development Strategies, School of Public and Environmental Affairs at Indiana University Bloomington, United States. He became an associate director for Research Department on Entrepreneurship, Growth & Public Policy at Max Planck Institute of Economics in Jena, Germany (May 2004 – September 2005), before accepting the call for the chair of Management and Organization at Augsburg University in September 2005. He was member of the board for the MBA-Program in Augsburg (2005–2012), chairman of the board for “Global Business Management” (2006–2014).

== Research ==
His research targets on the gap between globalization of firms and markets on the one hand and regionalization effects on the other. In particular, he is interested in how firms can access necessary resources such as financial capital, human capital and knowledge spillovers from their location (Spatial Resource Management), how these resources are transformed into marketable products to exploit strategic advantages in a globalized world (Organizational Capital Management) and how these processes are governed to ensure that all investors with relationship specific investments could be protected within this process (Corporate Governance).

== Selected publications ==
- The Routledge Companion to the Makers of Modern Entrepreneurship, New York: Routledge, 2017 (ed. Volume with David B. Audretsch).
- The Seven Secrets of Germany: Economic Resilience in an Era of Global Turbulence, Oxford University Press, 2016, (with David B. Audretsch).
- University Evolution, Entrepreneurial Activity and Regional Competitiveness, Heidelberg: Springer 2015 (ed. Volume with David B. Audretsch, M. Meoli and S. Vismara).
- Globalization and Public Policy - A European Perspective, Heidelberg: Springer 2015 (ed. Volume with David B. Audretsch, A. Richardson and S. Vismara).
- Corporate Governance and the Entrepreneurial Firm, 2014, Boston: NOW Publishers (with David B. Audretsch).
- Entrepreneurship and Economic Growth, 2005, Cambridge: Cambridge University Press (with David B. Audretsch and M. Keilbach).
