= Academy of Management Discoveries =

- Discipline: Management
- Language: English
- Edited by: Chet Miller

Publication details
- History: 2015–present
- Publisher: Academy of Management (United States)
- Frequency: Quarterly
- Impact factor: 4.3 (2023)

Standard abbreviations
- ISO 4: Acad. Manag. Discov.

Indexing
- ISSN: 2168-1007
- OCLC no.: 794730240

Links
- Journal homepage

Academy of Management Discoveries is a quarterly peer-reviewed academic journal on poorly-understood phenomena in management. According to the Journal Citation Reports, the journal has a 2022 impact factor of 6.3. The editor-in-chief is Chet Miller (University of Houston).

Established in 2015, this is the latest journal in the portfolio of the Academy of Management. It publishes exploratory empirical research that reports novel findings or unusual empirical patterns, which existing theories neither adequately predict nor explain.
