= Jönköping University =

Swedish university college

- Jönköping University
- Former name: Högskolan i Jönköping
- Type: Private university college
- Established: 1977; 49 years ago
- Accreditation: EQUIS; AACSB; AMBA
- Affiliations: EUA; EFMD; AACSB; TPC; European Institute for Advanced Studies in Management; PRME
- Endowment: $100 million
- President: Måns Svensson
- Faculty: 805 full time (academic staff, researchers and employed research students)
- Students: 14 718 registered, 8307 FTE
- Doctoral students: 191
- Location: (Sweden) Jönköping, Sweden; 57.779°N 14.162°E
- Campus: Urban
- Professors: 52 full professors
- Colors: Gray, black and purple
- Nickname: JU
- Website: www.ju.se

Jönköping University (JU), formerly Högskolan i Jönköping, is a private Swedish university college located in Jönköping, Sweden. The college has approximately 805 employees and 14,718 students.

Jönköping University is a young professional-oriented college characterized by a high degree of internationalization and extensive collaboration with surrounding society and business. JU was established in 1977 as Högskolan i Jönköping and offers today 80 programs and specializations at undergraduate and graduate level. Focus areas within research are entrepreneurship, technical expertise spanning small, medium-sized to large companies, health care, social work, education and communication. The institution prepares students for working in an international context.

Jönköping University is ranked 168th in the 2024 Young University Rankings by Times Higher Education. In THE's World University Rankings 2024, it is ranked 601-800 globally, and 11th in Sweden.

== Organization ==
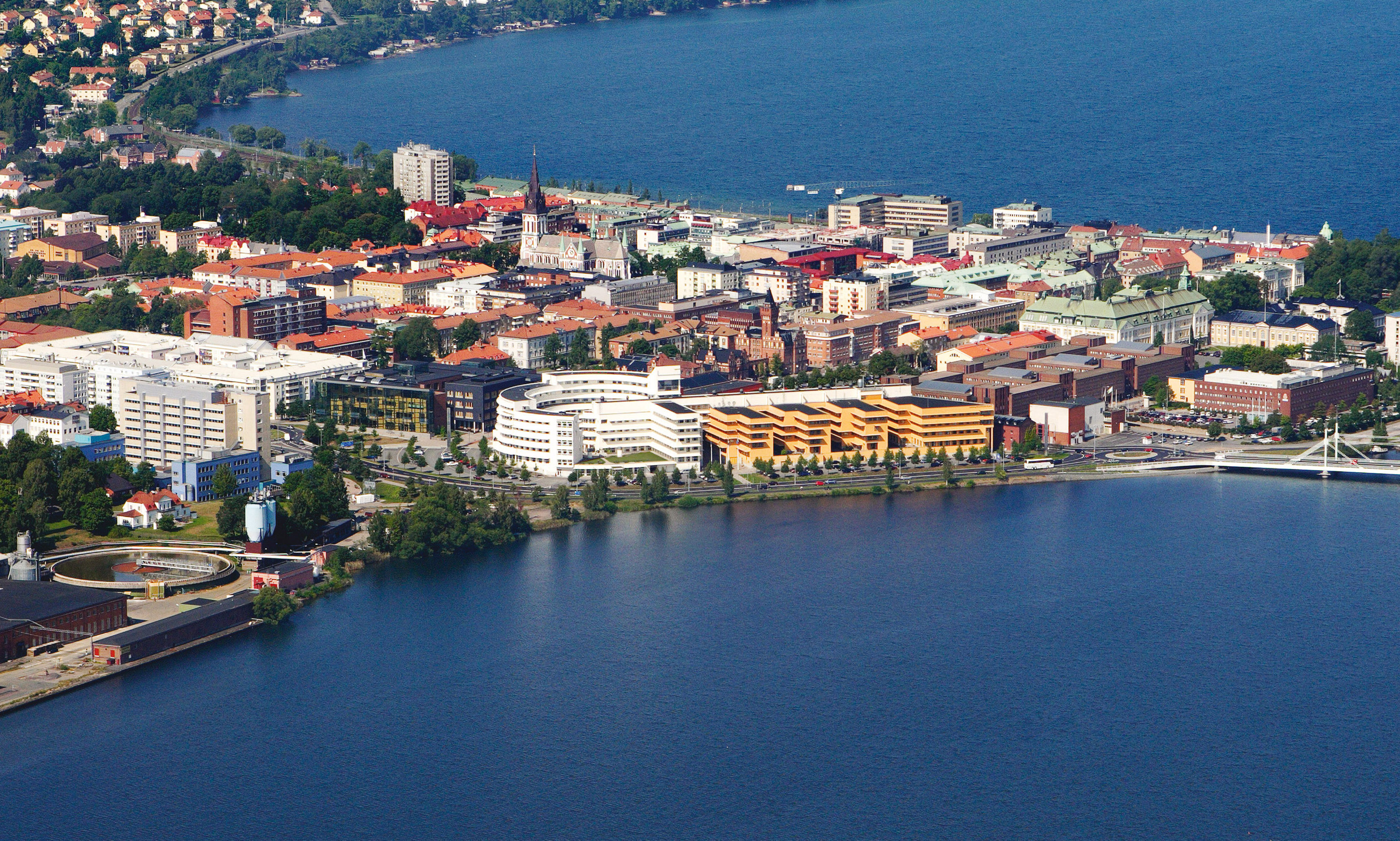
Jönköping University in 2006.

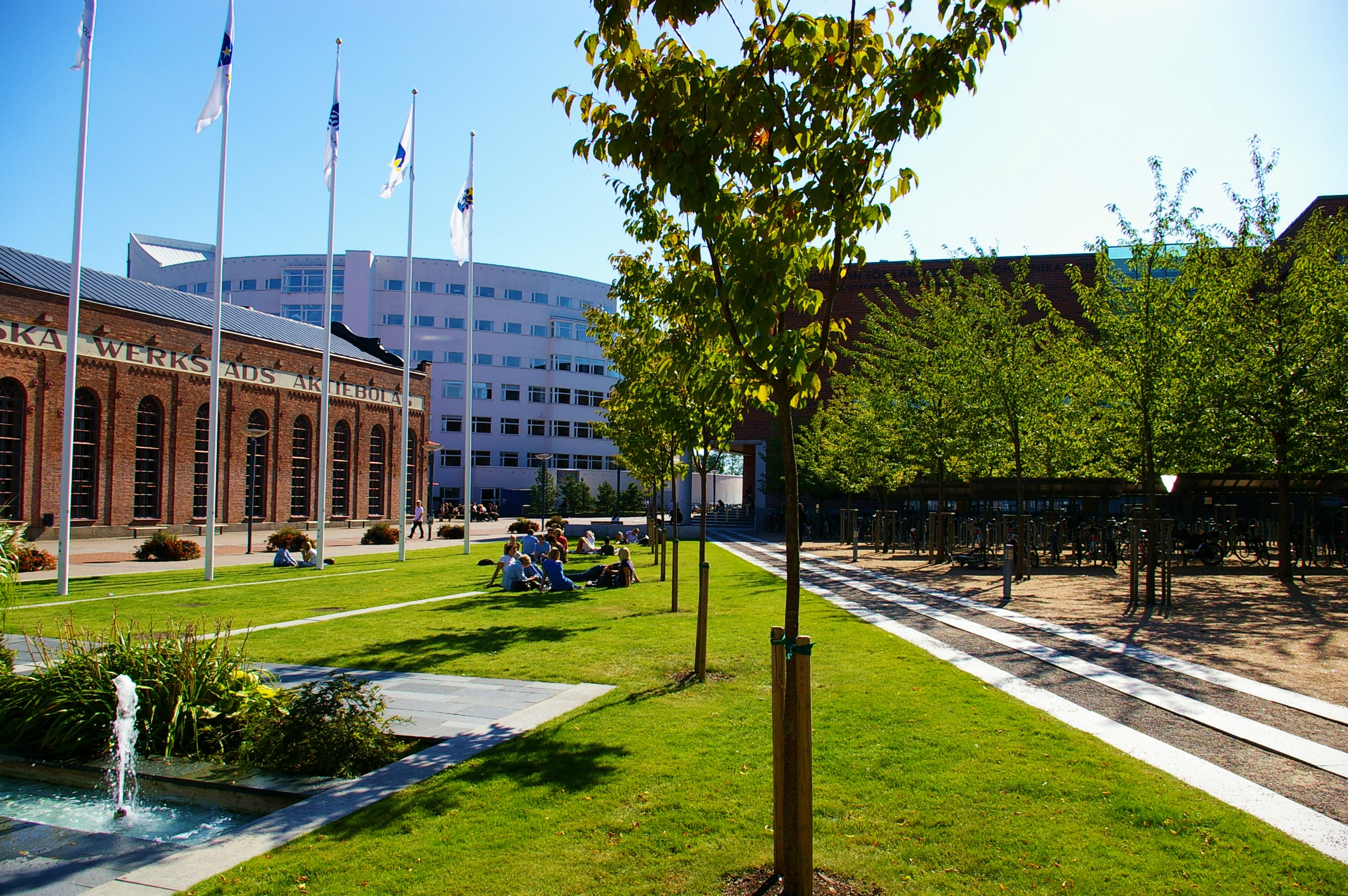
Part of the inner yard of Jönköping University

Jönköping University is a Swedish private institution of higher education with the right to award bachelor's, master's, and doctorate degrees in certain areas. In technology, the college may award degrees in the area of industrial product development with the three technical postgraduate subjects of machine design, materials and manufacturing, and production systems. The research focus is on entrepreneurship, ownership, and renewal; collaborative industrial product development, especially applications in manufacturing and related service industries; preserving and restoring the health, well-being, and welfare of individuals; and the conditions of learning and communication. The first professors were installed in 1995, and the first PhDs were awarded in 2000.

JU operates on the basis of an agreement with the Government of Sweden and conforms to national degree regulations and quality requirements. The college's academics are organized into several schools. Schools that have undergraduate and graduate programs include:

- School of Education and Communication
- School of Health and Welfare
- Jönköping International Business School
- Jönköping School of Engineering

The University Services provides services such as study administration, studies and career guidance, IT service, care taker's office, communication and marketing as well as accounting and human resource administration.

Jönköping University's vision, People First, “communicates an ambition to include a people-oriented perspective in all decisions, processes, and activities.” For the university, this means that students, employees, and the surrounding community are at the center of its activities. The vision is realized by all companies within JU developing goals, indicators, and processes for follow-up in five target areas: sustainability and work environment, education, research, internationalization, and collaboration.

== Name ==
The college titles itself as Jönköping University in official Swedish texts, a decision which met criticism in Sweden, in part as it was perceived as an attempt to profile the college as having full university status. The name change was reported in 2016 by the Swedish Language Council (Språkrådet) to the Parliamentary Ombudsman (Justitieombudsman), which chose not to set the matter to trial. The college responded with a statement that it was not out of the ordinary in an international context to profile itself as University. However, this has been seen by some as a way to engage in deceptive marketing and a way to give the school a higher status. This is due to the fact that university colleges are, sometime but not always, limited when it comes to which specific areas of academia it is possible for students to pursue a PhD in at the particular school.

== Campus ==
The JU Campus is situated in the city centre of Jönköping, on the western shore of the lake Munksjön and not far from the south shore of the lake Vättern, about five minutes walk from the Central Station.

The other Campus of JU is in Gränna. It's for the students who study in pathway programs. Students can take the bus 121 or 122 from Campus Gränna to Campus Jönköping.

== History ==
1897: The first nursing students received their degree qualifications in Jönköping by Jönköping County.

1947: An elementary-school teachers' training college was established in Jönköping.

1963: A pre-school teachers' training college started in Jönköping.

1968: The elementary-school teachers' training college becomes "Jönköping Teacher School" and moves house to Västra Torget. The county's central school for the caring profession moves to new premises on Munksjö beach and in 1971 changes its name to "Munksjö School".

1970: The Institute for Gerontology and the "Ortos" Laboratory were started by Jönköping County, they later became part of the School of Health Sciences.

1975: Higher Vocational Education started in Jönköping.

1977: Reform of Swedish higher education. Jönköping University College is set up as a state university college. The "Jönköping Teacher School" and the pre-school teachers' training college merged into the college. A two-year economic education started, become three-year in 1978. The Communication Officer (Informatör) programme started this year, it later became the Media and Communication programme. Some of the caring programmes at the Munksjö School become university programmes.

1979: First international student exchange; teacher training in Liverpool.

1981: Single subject courses relocated to the municipalities in the county.

1983: The Munksjö School starts a Prosthetics and Orthotics programme, focus: orthopedic technician, which is still now the only in its kind in Sweden.

1987: The Munksjö School's university educations within the health sector are renamed the School of Health Sciences.

1988: First engineering programme starts at Jönköping University College.

1994: Jönköping University Foundation was founded, with three schools; the School of Education and Communication, the School of Engineering and Jönköping International Business School as well as University Services. A joint faculty for the three schools is founded and the first right to award master's degrees are given to Jönköping University. Host company activities start at Jönköping International Business School and the School of Engineering.

1995: Jönköping University is given the right to award doctorates in four business school subjects. Research education is started at Jönköping International Business School.

1996: The first professors' inauguration at Jönköping University. Organized support for student business ventures is started by two students.

1997: The new campus is opened (Stage I) which includes the President's Office, Jönköping International Business School and University Services. In 1998 the School of Engineering moves to campus. First doctoral thesis defence. 1999: First conferment of doctoral degree at Jönköping University. The School of Health Sciences is given the right to award degrees in Social Science.

2000: The School of Education and Communication's new building stands ready (Stage II).

2001: Education in vocational education is started at the School of Education and Communication. Science Park Jönköping opens near the college and takes over, among other things, the support of student enterprises.

2002: The School of Health Sciences becomes the fourth school within Jönköping University. The Students' House is opened.

2004: The college is given the right to award doctorates within the Humanities and Social Sciences. First international scientific magazine published in Jönköping, the Journal of Media Business Studies.

2005: The college Library is named Library of the Year in Sweden.

2007: 1 January 2007 Ingenjörshögskolan (the School of Engineering) is reorganized as Tekniska Högskolan i Jönköping (JTH). The name is not changed in English. A long-term collaboration with Chalmers and KTH (The Royal Institute of Technology) is set up.

2010: The college is given the right to award Licentiate and Doctoral Degrees in Engineering, research area: Industrial Production, Machine design, Material and manufacturing processes, and Production systems.

2011: The first fee-paying international students from countries outside the EU/EEA are welcomed to Jönköping University.

2013: The college's sports centre, Campus Arena, is inaugurated.

2015: As the first business faculty in Sweden, Jönköping International Business School received both AACSB and EQUIS accreditation.

== Education ==
Jönköping University offers courses and study programmes taught in Swedish and in English. Education is within the fields of health, nursing, social work, education, media and communication studies, technology, science and engineering as well as economics, law and informatics. Jönköping University offers courses and study programmes taught in English on all three levels: Bachelor, Master and Doctoral. Jönköping University Enterprise focuses on providing preparatory education for higher studies through Pathway Programmes.

== Pathway Programmes ==
Since 2016, Jönköping University offers programs for international students to meet the requirements needed to enter a bachelor’s or master's degree program at universities. Pathway students spend one or two semesters living in Gränna, Sweden depending on their program studying and integrating into Swedish society.

Four type of pathway programs are offered by Jönköping University; Year Programs, Semester Programs, Intensive Courses and Pathway for International Sports. Year Program students with conditional eligibility can choose to apply to study at BI Norwegian Business School or North Park University at the end of the year.

== Educator Center for Academic Teaching and Learning ==
In 2022, Jönköping University established a new center for academic teaching and learning in higher education, through President's Decision § 958. The center's mission and aim is to "drive forward the development of academic teaching and learning at Jönköping University in a number of ways: the Educate website; ongoing consultancy; courses, seminars and workshops; teaching labs; and as a point of contact for international, national and regional partners at JU in the field of teaching and learning in higher education." The center name is Educator Center for Academic Teaching and Learning, abbreviated as the acronym EDUCATE. It is the first time faculty at Jönköping University can access courses, seminars, workshops and professional guidance from a common, shared, resource between the individual schools at Jönköping University. Previously, access to courses in pedagogy for higher education has been organized by the School of Education and Communication. In late 2022, EDUCATE launched an external website to enable easy access to services for staff and faculty, as well as external users.

== Accreditations ==
Jönköping International Business School is accredited by EQUIS (European Quality Improvement System), AACSB and AMBA (The Association of MBAs). Triple accreditation, also known as the “Triple Crown,” means that a business school is accredited by three of the most prestigious international accreditation bodies: AACSB, AMBA, and EQUIS. Only 135 business schools in the world have all three accreditations and in Sweden only three schools have been accredited.

== Rankings ==
In 2024, Times Higher Education (THE) placed Jönköping University at 168th in its global Young University Rankings. In 2023, JU had placed in the 201–250 range.

Year	Times Higher Education (THE) - Young University Rankings
2024	168
2023	201–250

Since 2021, Jönköping International Business School is ranked among the top 95 in Financial Times (FT) European Business School and top 100 in FT's Masters in Management. The FT rankings are recognised across the globe and build on a range of data, including information from previous graduates.

Year	Financial Times (FT) - European Business School Rankings
2022	88
2023	82
2024	74

== Doctoral programmes ==
Jönköping University has around 200 doctoral students as of 2019. The four doctoral programmes at Jönköping International Business School are called Business Administration, Economics, Informatics and Statistics. The doctoral programmes at the School of Education and Communication lead to a doctoral degree the following subjects: Education, Disability Research, Media and Communication Science, Education with Specialisation in Didactics and Education with Specialisation in Special Education. The doctoral programmes at the School of Engineering all have an individual syllabus for every student and fall into the following areas: Machine Design, Materials and Manufacturing, and Production Systems. The doctoral programmes at the Research School of Health and Welfare approach the following subjects: Health and Care Sciences, Welfare and Social Sciences, and Disability Research.

== Research ==
The college is entitled to issue licentiate and doctoral degrees in the disciplinary research domain of humanities and social sciences. Within technology, the college can issue licentiate and doctoral degrees in the field of industrial product development. Focus for research is entrepreneurship, ownership and business renewal, technical expertise and know-how to small- and medium-sized enterprises, the conditions for education and communication, and health, care and social work from a unique holistic perspective.

Jönköping University's first full professors were inaugurated in 1996, and the first PhDs were conferred in 2000.

== Research centres and institutes ==
Jönköping International Business School:

- Centre for Family Entrepreneurship and Ownership (CeFEO)
- Centre for Entrepreneurship and Spatial Economics (CEnSE)
- Media Management and Transformation Centre (MMT Centre)

School of Education and Communication:

- CHILD - Children, Health, Intervention, Learning and Development (with the School of Health and Welfare)
- Lifelong Learning
- Encell - National Centre for Lifelong Learning
- Media and Communication Science
- LPS - Learning Practices inside and outside School
- Practice based Educational Research
- Superintendents Institute
- LeaDMe - Learning, Digitalization, and Media

School of Engineering:

- Product and Production Development
- Materials and Manufacturing
- Supply Chain and Operations Management
- Computer Science and Informatics
- Mathematics and Physics
- Construction Engineering and Lighting Science
- CIC - Casting Innovation Centreexternal link, opens in new window

School of Health Sciences:

- The Jönköping Academy for Improvement of Health and Welfare
- A.D.U.L.T. - Activity, Daily-life, Utility, Life-style and Transition
- ARN-J - Aging Research Network - Jönköping
- CHILD - Children, Health, Intervention, Learning and Development (with School of Education and Communication)
- SALVE - Social Work, Actors, Living conditions and research VEnue
- Improvement, innovation and leadership in health and welfare
- Biomedical Platform
- Centre for Oral Health
- Prosthetics and Orthotics

== Honorary doctors ==
- Åke E. Andersson
- David B. Audretsch
- Candida G. Brush
- Urban Bäckström
- Arne Dahle
- John Elliott
- Barbara Green
- Gösta Gunnarsson
- Gunnar Hallingberg
- Christina Hamrin
- Anne Huff
- Sven-Olof Karlsson
- Maureen Kilkenny
- Göran Koch
- Lennart Israelsson
- Gerald McClearn
- Deirdre McCloskey
- Serge Moscovici
- Dennis C. Mueller
- Sven Nilsson
- Nancy Pedersen
- Carl-Axel Petri
- Per Risberg
- Gunnar Randholm
- Chandra A. Reynolds
- Josef Rydén
- Pramodita Sharma
- Dean Andrew Shepherd
- Doru M. Stefanescu
- David Storey
- Roger R. Stough
- Bertil Svensson
- Shaker Zahra

== Science Park Jönköping ==
JU is partner of and strongly engaged in the development of Science Park Jönköping which provides support for the start-up, development and growth of business ventures. Science Park Jönköping is a member of SiSP- Swedish Incubators and Science Parks

== Student life ==
=== Jönköping Student Union (JSU) ===
JU has mandatory Student Union membership, which was decided by the college. Exceptions from this rule are the PhD students and students not studying at university level (preparatory programmes). The Student Union works with the four Student Associations from each faculty:

- LOK - School of Education and Communication
- HI-TECH - Jönköping School of Engineering
- Hälsosektion - School of Health and Welfare
- JIBS Student Association (JSA) - Jönköping International Business School

The Student Union works on the following areas: Monitoring of education quality, Student welfare issues, Integration, Student health, Housing issues and Services.

The Student Union has one annual meeting (Swedish: årsmöte) per year and it is the highest decision-making body of the union. During the annual meeting students elect representatives as well as votes on budget, goals, strategies and visions for the next fiscal year. Two of the elected representatives work in the Student Union full time as the presidium. The student associations have their own meetings to elect local representatives and vote on their budgets, goals, strategies and visions.

=== Student activities ===
The Student Union has a nightclub called Akademien, which translates to The Academy. It is exclusively for JU students, with the exception of students from other higher education institutions if they are admitted to a guest list. The Student Union also hosts the following activities over the year: Trips, Language Café, After School and Culture Day. The Student Union also plans and executes the Kick Off along with the college and the Student Associations. The Kick-off takes place in the start of the autumn semester for ten days, and the spring semester for five days. The Kick-off is voluntary to participate in and a good way for new students to get introduced to both the school and student life at JU. There are also JSU associations based on interests.

=== Student boilersuit ===
The college students are part of the Swedish culture of the Student boilersuit. Different Student Associations, the Student Union employees and one student association have different colours on the boilersuit

Boilersuit Colours
Colour	Type
Magenta	Jönköping Student Union Employees
Red	LOK - students of teaching/education
Blue	LOK - students of communication, HR and International work
Yellow	HI-TECH
White	Hälsosektion
Green	JSA
Black	Qult - organises trips to other higher education institutions outside of Jönköping, colloquially referred to as "utlandsphester".

== See also ==
- List of colleges and universities in Sweden
- University of Gothenburg
- Lund University
- Stockholm University
- Uppsala University
- Linköping University
