= David B. Audretsch =

American economist

- Born: November 15, 1954 (age 71)

Academic background
- Education: University of Wisconsin–Madison

Academic work
- Discipline: Industrial organization Innovation
- Institutions: Indiana University; University of Klagenfurt
- Awards: 2001 Global Award for Entrepreneurship Research, 2011 Schumpeter Prize
- Website: Information at IDEAS / RePEc

David Bruce Audretsch (born November 15, 1954) is an American economist. He is the Interim Dean at the O’Neill School of Public and Environmental Affairs at Indiana University. He also serves as Distinguished Professor and Ameritech Chair of Economic Development, as well as Director of the Institute for Development Strategies. He is co-founder and co-editor of Small Business Economics: An Entrepreneurship Journal, and also works as a consultant to the United Nations, the World Bank, the OECD, the EU Commission, and the U.S. Department of State. He was the director of the Entrepreneurship, Growth and Public Policy Group at the Max Planck Institute of Economics in Germany from 2003 to 2009. Since 2020, he also serves as a distinguished professor in the Department of Innovation Management and Entrepreneurship at the University of Klagenfurt.

Audretsch is a member of the advisory board to a number of international research and policy institutes, including chair of the German Institute for Economic Research in Berlin, chair of the Foundation for the Promotion of German Science (Stifterverband für die Deutsche Wissenschaft), New York Academy of Sciences, the Swedish Entrepreneurship Forum, and the Jackstädt Centre for Entrepreneurship in Wuppertal, Germany.

He has received honorary doctorate degrees from Jonköping University in Sweden and University of Augsburg in Germany. He is an honorary professor of Industrial Economics and Entrepreneurship at the WHU – Otto Beisheim School of Management in Germany. In addition, Audretsch serves as a visiting professor at the King Saud University in Saudi Arabia, honorary professor at the University of Jena in Germany, and is a research fellow of the Centre for Economic Policy Research in London. He was awarded the 2011 Schumpeter Prize from the University of Wuppertal and the 2001 Global Award for Entrepreneurship Research by the Swedish Foundation for Small Business Research. In 2021, he was named a Clarivate Citation Laureate, an international honor reserved for researchers whose work has been deemed to be "of Nobel class" as demonstrated by analysis carried out by the Institute for Scientific Information.

== Background ==
Audretsch got his B.A. at Drew University in 1976, his M.S. in economics in 1979, and his doctorate in 1980 from the University of Wisconsin–Madison.

== Research ==
Audretsch's research focuses on the links between entrepreneurship, government policy, innovation, economic development, and global competitiveness. His articles, mainly in the fields of industrial organization and innovation, number more than 100 and have been published in journals such as The American Economic Review, The European Economic Review, The Review of Economics and Statistics, and the International Journal of Industrial Organization.

=== Selected books ===
- The Seven Secrets of Germany, (with Erik E. Lehmann). New York City: Oxford University Press, (2015)
- Everything in its Place: Entrepreneurship and The Strategic Management of Cities, Regions and States, New York: Oxford University Press, (2015)
- The Handbook of Local Competitiveness, New York: Oxford University Press (2015)
- Public Policy in the Entrepreneurial Society, Northampton, MA: Edward Elgar Publishing (2013)
- Creating Competitiveness: Entrepreneurship and Innovation Policies for Growth, (with M.L. Walshok). Northampton, MA: Edward Elgar Publishing (2013)
- Entrepreneurship, Growth and Public Policy, (with Z. Acs and R. Strom). New York: Cambridge University Press (2012)

== Awards ==
- Clarivate Citation Laureate ("Nobel Class", 2021)
- Distinguished Professorship (2020), University of Klagenfurt
- Highly Commended Paper Award (2013) and Citation for Excellence Award (2012), Emerald Literati Network
- Schumpeter School Award, University of Wuppertal (2011)
- Eighth Most Prominent Economist (2009), Handelsblatt Economic Ranking, Germany
- Distinguished Professorship (2008), Indiana University
- One of the 60 Most Influential Economists of All Time in the 2007 book Die Wichtigsten Wirtschaftsdenker by Vera Linß (Frankfurter Rundschau)
- 21st Most-Cited Scholar in Economics and Business, January 1996 – June 2006, Thompson Essential Science Indicators
