= Steven Klepper =

American economist

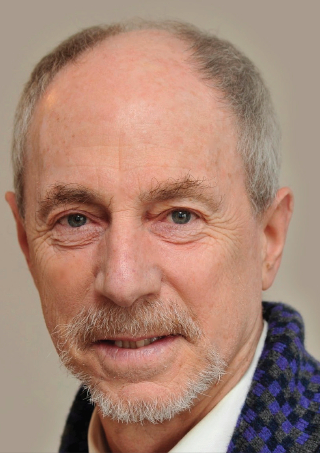
- Influential Economics Professor
- Born: January 24, 1949; Brooklyn, New York, U.S.
- Died: May 27, 2013 (aged 64); Pittsburgh, Pennsylvania, U.S.
- Occupations: economics professor, academic, author
- Years active: 39
- Spouse: Florence Rouzier
- Children: 2
- Awards: 2011: Global Award for Entrepreneurship Research

Steven Irwin Klepper (January 24, 1949 - May 27, 2013) was an American economics professor, researcher and author. Klepper was the Arthur Arton Hamerschlag Professor of Economics and Social Science at Carnegie Mellon University (CMU) in Pittsburgh, Pennsylvania. He was recognized for his teaching and research related to the integration of traditional economic models with evolutionary theory, and finding connections between the study of entrepreneurship and mainstream economics. In 2011, he was the recipient of the Global Award for Entrepreneurship Research. Klepper authored more than 100 peer-reviewed articles generating more than 10,000 citations. He is listed in the top five percent of most influential economist authors in the world according to IDEAS/RePEc.

== Education ==
Klepper received a Ph.D. from Cornell University in 1975.

== Career ==
Klepper joined the faculty of Carnegie Mellon University in 1980. Previously he was an assistant professor of economics at the State University of New York at Buffalo from 1974 to 1980.

According to his colleagues, Klepper had a distinctive style of educating students in his introductory economics classes at Carnegie Mellon University. This style became known on campus as "Kleppernomics." Klepper's post-class meetings with students who did not perform well on his exams became known on the campus as being "Klepperized." He was highly committed to educating his students, as evidenced by the fact that he did not miss a day of teaching for almost 40 years.

== Research ==
A comprehensive review of Klepper's academic and research contributions to the field of economics were published in "Industry Evolution and Entrepreneurship: Steven Klepper's Contribution to Industrial Organization, Strategy, Technological Change, and Entrepreneurship" (Serguey Braguinsky with Rajshree Agarwal), Strategic Entrepreneurship Journal, 9(4), 2015, pp. 380–397. doi:10.1002/sej.1179 The paper reviews Steven Klepper's scholarly contributions in industry evolution, employee entrepreneurship, and geographical clusters, while tracing the evolution of his career and identifying the unique characteristics and processes he used to undertake his research.

Klepper was regarded at CMU as a "brilliant researcher whose work challenged generations of young economists and entrepreneurs to look beyond traditional assumptions."

== Honors and recognition ==
Klepper's education honors include:

- Carnegie Mellon University Graduate School of Industrial Administration, Lifetime Teaching Award, 2001.
- William H. and Frances S. Ryan Award for Meritorious Teaching (Carnegie Mellon University Teaching Award), 1996–1997.
- Elliot Dunlap Smith Award for Distinguished Teaching and Educational Service, College of Humanities and Social Sciences, Carnegie Mellon University, 1984–1985.
- SUNY/Buffalo Nominee for the SUNY Chancellor's Award for Excellence in Teaching, 1979–1980. In 2011

Professional honors include:

- Klepper received the Global Award for Entrepreneurship Research in 2011 from the Swedish Entrepreneurship Forum, the Swedish Agency for Economic and Regional Growth, and the Research Institute of Industrial Economics, for his contributions to the understanding of the birth and growth of new industries. The award carried a prize of 100,000 Euros ($136,531) and is recognized as one of the most prestigious honors in entrepreneurship research.
- The Consortium on Competitiveness and Cooperation (CCC) honored Klepper on March 22, 2013 and presented an International Conference and Community Memorial on October 22, 2014 to celebrate Klepper's integral role in creating and leading the organization. The CCC Doctoral Conference was first organized by Klepper and others in 1994 and several hundred doctoral students have participated since then.
- On May 28, 2008, Klepper received an honorary doctorate (doctor rerum politicarum honoris causa—Dr. ver. Pol h.c.) from the Friedrich Schiller Universitat Jena, Jena.
- He was also the recipient of the 2002 Schumpeter Prize (€10,000) for "The Evolution of the U.S. Automobile Industry and Detroit as its Capital," and received IBM Faculty Partnership Awards ($40,000 per year) in 2000 and 2001.

== Publications ==
Klepper was a prolific and highly cited author of numerous works, which are cataloged on his page in Research Papers in Economics.

In 2015, Klepper's book, Experimental Capitalism: The Nanoeconomics of American High-Tech Industries ISBN 9780691169620 was published posthumously by Princeton University Press.

Klepper's research has been published in leading journals in economics and management, including the American Economic Review, the Journal of Political Economy, Econometrica, and Management Science.

== Personal life ==
Steven Klepper was born in Brooklyn, New York. After receiving degrees from Cornell University, he first taught at SUNY Buffalo. There, he met and married his wife of 33 years, Florence Rouzier. The couple moved to Pittsburgh when Klepper accepted a position with the Department of Social and Decision Sciences at Carnegie Mellon University, where he remained a member of the faculty until his death in 2013. He was the father to son Julian, and daughter, Arielle. According to his family, he was known personally for his wit and for being a formidable competitor, both on and off the tennis court.
