= Candida Brush =

American academic

- Education: University of Colorado Boulder (B.A.); Boston College (M.B.A.); Boston University (Ph.D.)
- Occupation: Prefessor
- Known for: She is the Franklin W. Olin Professor of Entrepreneurship at Babson College

Candida Brush is the Franklin W. Olin Professor of Entrepreneurship at Babson College. She is one of the founders of the Diana Project at Babson. As a founding scholar of the Diana Project (aka the Diana Group), she was awarded the Global Award for Entrepreneurship Research in 2007. She researches women's entrepreneurship.

== Education ==
She graduated from University of Colorado Boulder, with a BA Spanish and Latin American studies, Boston College Carroll School of Management, with an MBA marketing and entrepreneurship. and Boston University, with a PhD Strategy & Policy.

She received an Honorary PhD Business & Economics from Jonkoping University, Jonkoping, Sweden.

== Publications ==
- Nikou, S., Orrensalo, t., Brush, C. S. (2022). Entrepreneurs Information-Seeking Behaviors in the Digital Age: A Systematic Literature Review and a Meta-Analysis. Journal of Small Business Management.
- Brush, C. S., Eddleston, K., Edelman, L., McAdam, M., Rossi-Lamastra, C., Manolova, T. (2022). Catalyzing Change and Innovation in Women's Entrepreneurship- Introduction to the Special Issue. Strategic Entrepreneurship Journal, 16(2), 243-254
- Edited by Séverine Le Loarne – Lemaire, Professor of Strategic Management and Head of the Female Entrepreneurship for a Renewed Economy Research Chair, Grenoble Ecole de Management, France, Candida G. Brush, Franklin W. Olin Distinguished Chair of Entrepreneurship, Babson College, US and Visiting Adjunct, Nord University, Norway and Dublin City University, Ireland, Andrea Calabrò, Professor of Family Business and Entrepreneurship and Adnane Maâlaoui, Professor of Entrepreneurship, IPAG Business School, France (2022) Women, Family and Family Businesses Across Entrepreneurial Contexts. London: Edward Elgar
- Henry, C. S., Coleman, S., Foss, L., Orser, B., Brush, C. S. (2021). "Richness in Diversity: Towards more Contemporary Research Conceptualizations of Women's Entrepreneurship". International Small Business Journal, 39(7), 609-618
- Balachandra, L., Brush, C. S., Fischer, K. (2021). "Words Matter: Men, Women, and the Power of the Spoken Word in Entrepreneurial Pitching". Journal of Business Venturing Insights, 15
- Edelman, L. F., Manolova, T., Brush, C. S., Chow, C. (2021). "Signal Configurations: Exploring Set- Theoretic Relationships in Angel Investing. Journal of Business Venturing", 23(5), 547-566
- Neck, H. M., Brush, C. S., Greene, P. G. (2021) (Eds.) Teaching Entrepreneurship: A Practice Based Approach, Vol. 2 (pp. 392). Northampton, MA: Edward Elgar Publishing
