= Arnold C. Cooper =

Professor Arnold C. Cooper (March 9, 1933 – December 6, 2012) was a management scholar and a pioneer in the field of entrepreneurship and strategic management. During his academic career, that spanned over 40 years, Arnold Cooper made several contributions to the overall knowledge in the field of entrepreneurship. He also played a significant part in organizing the research field and he helped the elevation of entrepreneurship research to a higher academic level.

== Early life ==
Arnold Cooper was born in Chicago in 1933. His father worked as a railway postal clerk on the train line between Chicago and Cincinnati, where the family moved when Arnold was three years old. They then moved again, to New Castle, Indiana where he grew up. Arnold Cooper went to New Castle High School from where he graduated 1951. In the fall that same year, he went to college at Purdue University, in Lafayette, Indiana, as a chemical engineering major.

== Career ==
Cooper received his degree in chemical engineering from Purdue University in 1955. After six months serving as a second lieutenant in the Army Chemical Corps, in 1956, he enrolled in the newly started Industrial Management MBA (Master of Business Administration) program at Purdue University, in what later became the Krannert School of Management.

After graduating The MBA program at Purdue University in 1957, Cooper worked for a year at Procter & Gamble in Cincinnati, but then he got accepted as a PhD student at Harvard Business School, Boston, where he went in the fall of 1958. At Harvard, Cooper started working with Professor W. Arnold Hosmer who studied small growing technological firms in the Boston area. Cooper did his doctoral dissertation under the supervision of Hosmer, after he was finished he stayed on as a teacher at Harvard Business School between 1961 and 1963. In 1963, Cooper returned to Purdue University and the Krannert School of Management, as an assistant professor. In 1970 he became professor at the same faculty. Arnold Cooper stayed at Purdue University for the rest of his career, although he held visiting faculty positions at Stanford University, Manchester Business School in England, the Management Development Institute in Switzerland and the Wharton School at the University of Pennsylvania.

== Research ==
Arnold Cooper is considered to be one of the pioneering scholars in the field of entrepreneurship as well as strategic management. In his doctoral dissertation, Cooper studied the growth of small firms in the Boston area and in 1962 he presented his thesis Practices and Problems in the Development of Technically Advanced Products in Small Manufacturing Firms. Based on the findings from this study, Cooper published two articles in the Harvard Business Review, one in 1964 and one in 1966. In the articles, Cooper argued against the idea that larger companies enjoyed many advantages over smaller ones, especially in R&D, which was the prevailing view of the time.

A few years later (1968), while working as a visiting professor at Stanford University, Cooper conducted a groundbreaking study of spin-offs in technology-based firms in Silicon Valley. Looking at over 250 firms, Cooper found that the Spin-off rate in smaller firms was approximately 10 times higher than for larger companies. During the 1970s, Cooper published several articles based on his spin-off study, mainly focusing on the questions: why do new technological firms start where they do and what influence does already established firms in the geographical area have on the birthrate of new firms. Cooper found that the established firms or incubator organizations, has a major influence on the location of new firms.

In the 1980s Arnold Cooper conducted a major study of entrepreneurial diversity together with William Dunkelberg. A questionnaire was sent to over 6000 members of the National Federation of Independent Business (NFIB), with a response rate of 29% it was one of the largest and most diverse samples of small business owners studied at the time. In 1985 Cooper and William Dunkelberg, together with William Dennis and Carolyn Woo, conducted an even larger study of NFIB members. This time the goal was to answer questions about the entrepreneurial process, and the focus of the study was newly started firms. The main question was: Why do some new firms succeed whereas others fail? During the late 1980s and the 1990s Cooper analyzed the collected data and co-authored several articles based on the study, articles that are frequently cited in later entrepreneurial research.

== Awards ==
Arnold Cooper received the 1987 Distinguished Scholar Award from the International Council of Small Business, the 1997 International Award for Entrepreneurship and Small Business Research (today known as the Global award for Entrepreneurship Research), and numerous best paper awards. He has won five teaching awards from Purdue University, the 1999 Richard D. Irwin Outstanding Educator Award, and the 1993 Coleman Entrepreneurship Mentor Award.

== Early articles ==
Cooper, Arnold C. (1964) R&D Is More Efficient in Small Companies. Harvard Business Review. May –June. p. 75-83.

Cooper, Arnold C. (1966) Small Companies can Pioneer New Products. Harvard Business Review. September–October. p. 162-179.

== Influential articles ==
Cooper, A.C., Gimeno-Gascon, F.J. & Woo, C.Y. (1994) Initial Human and Financial Capital as Predictors of New Venture Performance. Journal of Business Venturing. 9. p. 317-395.

Cooper, A.C. & Woo, C.Y. & Dunkelberg, W.C., 1988, Entrepreneurs’ Perceived Chances of Success, Journal of Business Venturing. 3. p. 97-108.

Gimeno, J., Folta, T.B., Cooper, A.C. & Woo, C.Y. (1997) Survival of the Fittest? Entrepreneurial Human Capital and the Persistence of Underperforming Firms. Administrative Science Quarterly. 42. p. 750-783.

== Books ==
Hosmer, Windsor, Tucker & Cooper (1966) Small Business Management: A Casebook. Homewood, IL: Richard D. Irwin, Inc.

Cooper, A. (1971)The Founding of Technologically Based Firms. MI: The Center for Venture Management.

Cooper, A. & Komives, J. (ed) (1972) Technical Entrepreneurship: A Symposium. MI: The Center for Venture Management.

Hosmer, Larue, Cooper & Vesper (1977) The Entrepreneurial Function: Text and Cases in the Management of Smaller Firms. Englewood Cliffs, NJ: Prentice–Hall, Inc.

Cooper, A., Dunkelberg, W., Woo, C. & William Dennis Jr. (1990) New Business in America: The Firms and their Owners. Washington, DC: The NFIB Foundation.

Cooper, A., Alvarez, S., Carrera, A., Mesquita, L. & Vassolo, R. (ed) (2006) Entrepreneurial Strategies. Oxford, UK: Blackwell.

Arnold C. Cooper and Shailendra Mehta (2006): Preparation for Entrepreneurship – Does it Matter? Journal of Private Equity. Fall 2006, Vol. 9, no. 4, pp. 6–15.
