= Effectuation =

Effectuation is a concept describing a way of deciding under uncertainty. As part of entrepreneurship research, effectuation portrays a strategy process in which an entrepreneur or a team starts from the resources already at hand and allows goals to emerge, instead of fixing a goal first and then assembling the means to reach it. Effectuation is to be used in situations, where a business needs to find new business opportunities or business models in circumstances, in which predictions are not possible due to high uncertainty. The term was introduced by the entrepreneurship scholar Saras D. Sarasvathy in 2001. A 2025 bibliometric review counted 680 journal articles on the concept published between 2001 and 2024. Effectuation has also drawn sustained criticism, over whether it qualifies as a theory and whether it accounts for how new ventures come about.

== Origins ==
The concept of effectuation was developed by the entrepreneurship scholar Saras D. Sarasvathy in 2001 as part of her doctoral work under the supervision of Herbert A. Simon and Lester Lave. She did research on how experienced entrepreneurs with several founded ventures would reason through a set of decisions in a hypothetical start-up. She found that experienced founders, in situations of great uncertainty, paid less attention to predictive information, were more concerned with limiting what they could lose, and put more emphasis on assembling partnerships. Sarasvathy found the following five principles or heuristics applied by the experienced founders:

== The five Principles of Effectuation ==
- "Pilot in the plane" - Control versus Prediction: seeking influence over an unpredictable future instead of forecasts of it
- "Bird in hand" - Means: starting with "Who I am (abilities) / What I know (expertise and experience) / Who I know (networks)"
- "Affordable loss" - Focus on Downside: committing only what can be lost rather than what promises the best expected return
- "Crazy quilt" - Co-Creation Partnership: building the venture out of commitments from partners who select themselves into it
- "Lemonade" - Leverage Contingencies: treating surprises as material to work with rather than as deviations from plan

== Criticism ==
Despite some positive evidence and expansion of the theory, effectuation currently remains a contested concept. In 2015, Arend, Sarooghi and Burkemper assessed effectuation against a three-part framework for evaluating theories and concluded that it lacked stated boundary conditions and testable predictions. In 2020, Kitching and Rouse criticised that effectuation reduces venture creation to a decision logic and hence yields an under-socialised and ahistorical account that sets aside the social structures and cultural settings shaping who is able to start a firm and on what terms. A broad review of 101 articles found that much of the published work had not engaged with the objections raised against it. Methodological critique stated that much of the evidence presented above rests on cross-sectional questionnaires answered by one respondent per firm, which may have impeded the accumulation of findings.

== See also ==
- Cynefin framework
- Volatility, uncertainty, complexity and ambiguity
