= Kathleen M. Eisenhardt =

American economist

Kathleen Marie Eisenhardt (born 1947) is the Stanford W. Ascherman, M.D. Professor and co-director of the Stanford Technology Ventures Program at Stanford University. She is also a corresponding fellow of the British Academy, having been elected in 2016. In 2012 she was the recipient of the Global Award for Entrepreneurship Research.

Eisenhardt is best known for the Eisenhardt Method, which aims to build theory from case comparisons.

== Awarded publications ==
- Bingham, Christopher B.; Eisenhardt, Kathleen M. (2006). "Unveiling How and What Firms Learn From Heterogeneous Experience: The Internationalization of Entrepreneurial Firms". Academy of Management Proceedings. doi:10.5465/ambpp.2006.27175549. ISSN 0065-0668. (Winner, Carolyn Dexter Best International Paper Award, Academy of Management).
- Brown, Shona L.; Eisenhardt, Kathleen (1998). Competing on the Edge: Strategy as Structured Chaos. Boston: Harvard Business School Press. ISBN 978-0-87584-754-2. (Winner, George R. Terry Book Award, Academy of Management).
- Davis, Jason P.; Eisenhardt, Kathleen M.; Bingham, Christopher B. (2009). "Optimal Structure, Market Dynamism, and the Strategy of Simple Rules". Administrative Science Quarterly. 54 (3): 413–452. doi:10.2189/asqu.2009.54.3.413. ISSN 0001-8392. (Winner, ASQ Award for Scholarly Contribution, Administrative Science Quarterly).
- Eisenhardt, Kathleen M. (1989). "Building Theories from Case Study Research". The Academy of Management Review. 14 (4): 532–550. doi:10.2307/258557. ISSN 0363-7425. (Nominated, AMR Decade Award, Academy of Management Review)
- Eisenhardt, Kathleen M.; Martin, Jeffrey A. (2000). "Dynamic Capabilities: What Are They?". Strategic Management Journal. 21 (10/11): 1105–1121. ISSN 0143-2095. JSTOR 3094429. (Winner, Dan and Mary Lou Schendel Best Paper Prize, Strategic Management Society).
- Eisenhardt, Kathleen M.; Tabrizi, Behnam N. (1995). "Accelerating Adaptive Processes: Product Innovation in the Global Computer Industry". Administrative Science Quarterly. 40 (1): 84–110. doi:10.2307/239370. ISSN 0001-8392. (Winner, ASQ Award for Scholarly Contribution, Administrative Science Quarterly).
- Sull, Donald N.; Eisenhardt, Kathleen M. (2015). Simple Rules: How to Thrive in a Complex World. Boston: Houghton Mifflin Harcourt. ISBN 978-0-544-70520-3. (Selected, Top Ten Summer Reads, Wall Street Journal).
- Tidhar, Ron; Eisenhardt, Kathleen M. (2019). "Get Rich or Die Trying: Unpacking Revenue Model Choice Using Machine Learning and Multiple Cases". Academy of Management Proceedings. doi:10.5465/ambpp.2019.216. ISSN 0065-0668. (Winner, William F. Glueck Best Paper Award, Academy of Management).
