= Family Business Review =

American academic journal

- Discipline: Business
- Language: English
- Edited by: Don Neubaum

Publication details
- History: 1988–present
- Publisher: SAGE Publications (United States)
- Frequency: Quarterly
- Impact factor: 8.8 (2022)

Standard abbreviations
- ISO 4: Fam. Bus. Rev.

Indexing
- ISSN: 0894-4865 (print); 1741-6248 (web)
- LCCN: sf93092906
- OCLC no.: 16115306

Links
- Journal homepage; Online access; Online archive

Family Business Review is a peer-reviewed academic journal that publishes papers in the field of Business. The journal's editor is G. Tyge Payne (Texas Tech University). It has been in publication since 1988 and is currently published by SAGE Publications in association with the Family Firm Institute.

== Scope ==
Family Business Review seeks to explore the dynamics of family-controlled enterprise, including firms ranging in size from the very large to the relatively small. The scholarly journal publishes interdisciplinary research on families of wealth and the family office covering such areas as succession planning, the impact of family dynamics on managerial behaviors and estate and tax planning.

== Abstracting and indexing ==
Family Business Review is abstracted and indexed in, among other databases: SCOPUS, and the Social Sciences Citation Index. According to the Journal Citation Reports, its 2022 impact factor is 8.8, ranking it #28 out of 154 journals in the category 'Business'.
