= Asia-Pacific Journal of Management Research and Innovation =

- Discipline: Management, business, organization studies
- Language: English
- Edited by: Shipra Jha

Publication details
- History: 2012
- Publisher: Sage Publications Pvt. Ltd. (India)
- Frequency: Quarterly

Standard abbreviations
- ISO 4: Asia-Pac. J. Manag. Res. Innov.

Indexing
- ISSN: 2319-510X (print); 2321-0729 (web)

Links
- Journal homepage; Online access; Online archive

The Asia Pacific Journal of Management Research and Innovation is a double blind peer reviewed academic journal published four times a year by Sage (New Delhi) in collaboration with the Asia Pacific Institute of Management.

This journal is a member of the Committee on Publication Ethics (COPE).

== Abstracting and indexing ==
Asia Pacific Journal of Management Research and Innovation is abstracted and indexed in:

- DeepDyve
- Dutch-KB
- Indian Citation Index (ICI)
- J-Gate
- OCLC
- Ohio
- Portico
