= Cost function =

Cost function

- In economics, the cost curve, expressing production costs in terms of the amount produced.
- In mathematical optimization, the loss function, a function to be minimized.
