= Family Firm Institute =

Family Firm Institute (FFI)
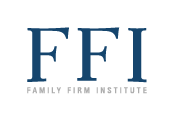
- Formation: 1986
- Type: Professional Association
- Headquarters: Boston, Massachusetts
- Location: United States
- Members: >1500
- Key people: Debbie Bing; Daniel Frosh; Helena von der Esch; Sandra McNeely; Anthony Macaluso
- Website: www.ffi.org

The Family Firm Institute (FFI) is an American professional membership association for individuals and organizations working in the family enterprise field. It owns the academic journal Family Business Review published by SAGE, the digital journal FFI Practitioner, and the Global Educational Network (GEN) which provides certificates in family business and family wealth advising.

FFI was founded in 1986. Its home office is in Boston, Massachusetts.
