= Research Institute of Industrial Economics =

Private independent research foundation

The Research Institute of Industrial Economics (Swedish: Institutet för Näringslivsforskning, IFN) is a private independent research foundation based in Stockholm, Sweden. Professor Fredrik Sjöholm is the managing director of the Institute and Professor Lars Persson is the deputy director. In addition, approximately 30 researchers are employed at IFN and about as many are affiliated to the institute.

The institute was founded in 1939. Ivar Andersson became the first managing director of the institute and Sigrid Edström its first chairman.
