= Academic entrepreneur =

The common definition of academic entrepreneur is similar to the original definition of ‘entrepreneur.’ It states “the AE (academic entrepreneur) is a university scientist, most often a professor, sometimes a PhD student or a post-doc researcher, who sets up a business company in order to commercialize the results of his/her research” Academic entrepreneurship today can be understood as either:

- A knowledge-based profession that is centered around technological development

- An income-oriented activity that creates a small business or firm from said technological development

- A particular behavior to be adapted by researchers in order to modify the pattern of university research

Academic entrepreneurship is part of the Third Mission of universities”

== Origin of the Academic Entrepreneur ==
The scientific career in the early 19th century had very few sources of funding and support coming from the university, state, or federal level, very much in contrast to the system today. Thus, those who wanted to make a career in the sciences at that time started by performing geological and natural history surveys. These surveys were funded by both the state and federal governments, and offered temporary employment for professionals such as chemists, mineralogists, and geologists. However, once the surveys were completed, many of these scientists found themselves unemployed. While in Britain, there were a number of other opportunities for academic employment outside of surveys (such as writing, reviewing, instrument making, and public lecturing) American scientists of the time struggled to find well paying jobs. Thus, to create more opportunities, many of these men began to lobby for more state and federal surveys that would offer more employment, which required experience, expertise, and a good deal of self-promotion. During these times, men of science first began to act like entrepreneurs, linking the two fields of science and entrepreneurship to create AE . ‘Academic entrepreneurship’ also originates from the American system of research, due to the fact that many universities in the US already possess entrepreneur-like characteristics. These characteristics include procuring funding and networking for resources. They are known to market their developments as products and ‘sell’ them at conferences, in a similar fashion to other economic businesses.

=== Academic Entrepreneur vs. Entrepreneur ===
A key distinction between the academic field of entrepreneurship and other entrepreneurial professions is that often small businesses tend to focus on societal impact and proliferation of their product, while researchers and the products that they market also aid in the progression and of the academic field. Many, if not most, AE's are also linked in some way to their university, faculty members, and students with both formal and informal obligations, which can create certain constraints and opportunities for researchers, while entrepreneurial businesses don't hold such connections.

== Role of the University in Academic Entrepreneurship ==
In the United States, academic entrepreneurs are primarily employed by the Universities where they conduct their research and business from. This provides the institution with a steady set of researchers and developers who maintain their focus on innovation, while also providing scientists with a reliable source of income while they invest in their innovations. Additionally, universities are often a significant source of funding for researchers and their projects as well, though today we are seeing an emergence of state and federal sources of funding as well. Many universities have created contracts with the scientists that they employ, which legally binds these innovators/researchers and their inventions to the university. This has implications for both the allocation of revenue received from a product and the distribution of credit for the product during its lifetime. The involvement of the university in the work of the AE has also been shaped by the recent adoption of the Bayh-Dole Act.

== The Bayh-Dole Act ==
The Bayh-Dole Act was enacted in 1980, and offered significant changes to both technology transfer and the field of academic entrepreneurship. This act allowed universities to retain the titles of inventions made through the employees of their institution, and from this be included in the patenting and licensing of innovations made on their campus. The opinion of this act and its significance on the field of academic entrepreneurship has been mixed since its implementation. While some see the shift in university commercialization as overall beneficial, as it promotes profound managerial and policy implications for those involved, others still question whether such institutional arrangements are socially optimal, or optimal for the researchers themselves. Quite a few of these concerns date to well before the act was enacted, and it is still up for debate whether such concerns have been adequately addressed or not.

=== Consequences of the Bayh-Dole Act ===
Since the enactment of the Bayh-Dole Act, there has been a substantial increase in the commercialization of university technology transfer. When academic entrepreneurship was first initiated, there were two main dimensions of technology transfer: patenting and licensing. There was less time given to the business aspect of these careers, to the point where classes on academic entrepreneurship hadn't even been established. However, recently there has been an increased importance placed on the start-up dimension of innovation, and the entrepreneur aspect of science has risen to equal, if not greater, importance as the scientific work itself. However, some still question whether the involvement of the university in technology transfer and the promotion of academic entrepreneurship has been truly effective at all. Evidence shows that there is little effectiveness of university technology transfer offices (TTOs) in promoting academic entrepreneurship, prompting many to question whether the Universities involvement is a necessity for the prospering of AE careers, or if researchers would be fine on their own.

=== Differences between European and US Academic Entrepreneurs ===
There are a number of differences between academic entrepreneurs of the United States and of Central/Eastern Europe. For one, AE's employed in the States are considered to be employees at their corresponding university, while in Europe they are seen as “civil servants or state employees”. In addition, there tends to be a much stronger sense of competition between researchers in the US, as they must battle to receive public funding for their projects. On the contrary, the European system does not exhibit such competition, and as a result seems to focus more on “systematic collaboration across institutional boundaries”. The most potent result that arises from such distinction between the eastern and western application of academic entrepreneurship is the effect on the salary of the researchers. For the US, compensation for their researchers is decentralized, which gives the universities a profound amount of autonomy in determining how much they wish to pay their employers. This means that, in many cases, the salary of US-based AE's is determined primarily by their productivity in the lab and with their research. In Europe, on the other hand, compensation is centralized and thus the universities do not have such autonomy. Compensation is instead determined by the state, which creates a standard rate for all in the same profession.

Furthermore, the US has a multilayer, decentralized system in regards to its decision-making process for research, meaning that approval for research comes from a number of political levels (including federal, state, and local) and agencies (public, private, foundations, etc.) On the other hand, the centralized European system only receives approval from a few levels.
