= Small Business Economics =

- Discipline: Entrepreneurship
- Language: English
- Edited by: D.B. Audretsch, Donald Siegel

Publication details
- History: 1989-present
- Publisher: Springer
- Frequency: Quarterly
- Impact factor: 6.4 (2022)

Standard abbreviations
- ISO 4: Small Bus. Econ.

Indexing
- CODEN: SBECEX
- ISSN: 0921-898X (print); 1573-0913 (web)
- LCCN: 89659272
- JSTOR: 0921898X
- OCLC no.: 20141957

Links
- Journal homepage; Online access

Small Business Economics is a peer-reviewed academic journal published by Springer Nature, covering research into all aspects of entrepreneurship from different disciplines, including economics, finance, management, psychology, and sociology. The editors-in-chief are D.B. Audretsch (Indiana University Bloomington) and Donald Siegel (Arizona State University). The editorial office of Small Business Economics is located at the Johnson Center for Entrepreneurship & Innovation, Kelley School of Business, Indiana University. It is one of the highest-ranked journals in entrepreneurship and innovation research worldwide.

== Abstracting and indexing ==
The journal is abstracted and indexed in:

- Academic OneFile
- Cengage
- Current Contents/Social & Behavioral Sciences
- EconLit
- Expanded Academic ASAP
- International Bibliography of Book Reviews
- International Bibliography of Periodical Literature
- International Bibliography of the Social Sciences
- ProQuest
- RePEc
- Scopus
- Social Sciences Citation Index

According to the Journal Citation Reports, the journal has a 2022 impact factor of 6.4.
