= Academy of Management Perspectives =

- Discipline: Management
- Language: English
- Edited by: Gideon D. Markman; Geoffrey Wood

Publication details
- History: 1987–present
- Publisher: Academy of Management (United States)
- Frequency: Quarterly
- Impact factor: 7.2 (2023)

Standard abbreviations
- ISO 4: Acad. Manag. Perspect.

Indexing
- ISSN: 1558-9080 (print); 1943-4529 (web)
- JSTOR: acadmanapers
- OCLC no.: 62270488

Links
- Journal homepage; Online access; Online archive

Academy of Management Perspectives is a peer-reviewed academic journal published by the Academy of Management. It covers issues concerning management and business. According to the Journal Citation Reports, the journal's 2022 impact factor is 8.9, ranking it 26th out of 155 journals in the "Business" category and 31st out of 227 journals in the "Management" category. Current editors-in-chief are Gideon D. Markman (Colorado State University) and Geoffrey Wood (Western University). The journal is indexed in Scopus.
