= Entrepreneurship Theory and Practice =

- Discipline: Entrepreneurship
- Language: English
- Edited by: Johan Wiklund

Publication details
- History: 1976-present
- Publisher: SAGE Publications
- Frequency: Bimonthly
- Impact factor: 10.5 (2022)

Standard abbreviations
- ISO 4: Entrep. Theory Pract.

Indexing
- ISSN: 1042-2587 (print); 1540-6520 (web)

Links
- Journal homepage

Entrepreneurship Theory and Practice is a bimonthly peer-reviewed academic journal in the field of entrepreneurship studies. Article topics include, but are not limited to national and international studies of enterprise creation, small business management, family-owned businesses, minority issues in small business and entrepreneurship, new venture creation, research methods, venture financing, and corporate and non-profit entrepreneurship.

The journal is published by SAGE Publications on behalf of Baylor University and is the official journal of the United States Association for Small Business and Entrepreneurship. It is listed as one of the 50 journals used by the Financial Times to compile its business-school research ranks. According to the Journal Citation Reports, the journal has a 2022 impact factor of 10.5.
