= Jönköping International Business School =

Business school in Sweden

Jönköping International Business School (JIBS)
- Internationella Handelshögskolan i Jönköping
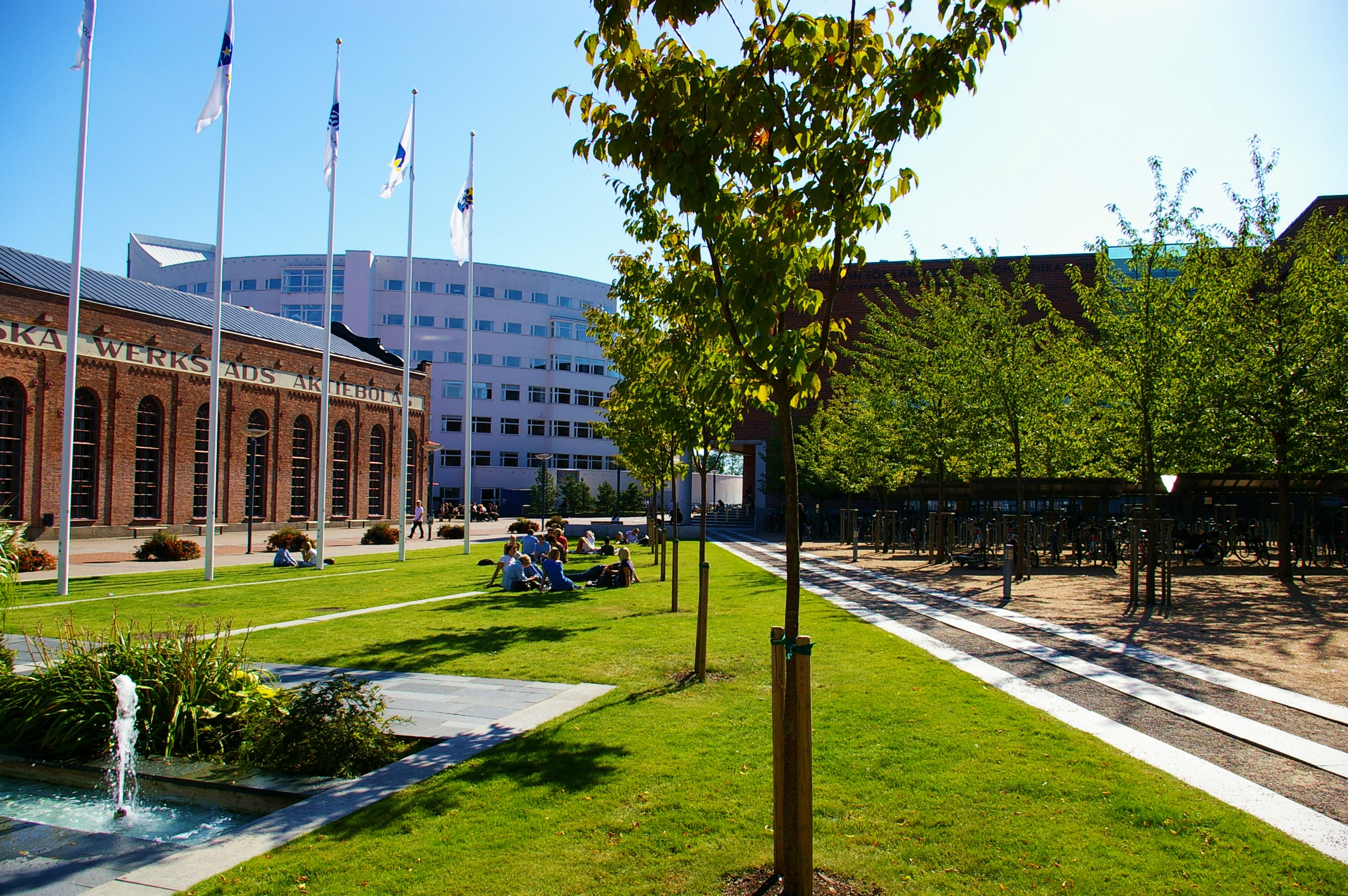
- Motto: International at heart. Entrepreneurial in mind. Responsible in action.
- Type: Business school
- Established: 1994; 32 years ago
- Affiliations: AACSB, EFMD (EQUIS), AMBA, EIASM, PRIME
- Dean: Martin Wallin
- Academic staff: 113
- Students: 2111
- Doctoral students: 67
- Location: Jönköping, Småland, (Sweden); 57.7782°N 14.1620°E
- Website: http://www.ju.se/jibs/en

Jönköping International Business School (JIBS), is a business school located in Jönköping in south central Sweden. It opened in 1994 and has focused on entrepreneurship, ownership and renewal. 30% of the faculty and 45% of the students at JIBS come from foreign countries, and the school claims to have 128 partner universities worldwide. Since 2001, several "centres of excellence" have been created, mainly financed by external funds; Media, Management and Transformation Centre (MMTC) (founded in 2003), Centre for Family Enterprise and Ownership (CeFEO) (founded in 2005), and Centre of Entrepreneurship and Spatial Economics (Cense) (founded in 2010).

The school is part of Jönköping University Foundation which was established in 1994. JIBS has been accredited by EQUIS since March 2015 and by AACSB since December 2015. It was accredited by Association of MBAs (AMBA) in June 2025, making it one of currently only three business schools in Sweden (and one of nine in Scandinavia) to hold triple accreditation.

== Location and campus ==
The Jönköping University Campus, consisting of Jönköping International Business School, School of Engineering, School of Education and Communication, School of Health Sciences, the University Library and University Services, is situated on the western shore of the lake Munksjön and not far from the south shore of the lake Vättern.

== Education ==
JIBS offers undergraduate and graduate programs in English and Swedish. JIBS students turn new ideas into businesses, often located at the Science Park in Jönköping, which works closely with the school. The school admits both Swedish and international students to the programs on equal terms.

=== Undergraduate programs ===
English undergraduate currently offered (2016):

- International Economics
- International Management
- Marketing Management
- Sustainable Enterprise Development

Swedish program offered (2021):

- Civilekonom (in English: Master of Science in Business and Economics)

=== Graduate programs ===
English graduate programs currently offered (2021):

- Engineering Management (1 year)
- International Financial Analysis (1 year)
- International Marketing (1 year)
- International Logistics and Supply Chain Management (2 years)
- Global Management (2 years)
- Strategic Entrepreneurship (2 years)
- Applied Economics and Data Analysis (2 years)
- Digital Business (2 years)

== Rankings ==
Financial Times

In 2024, the Financial Times ranked Jönköping International Business School #61 in their Masters in Management ranking and #74 in their European Business School ranking. In 2023, the Financial Times ranked Jönköping International Business School #64 in their Masters in Management ranking and #82 in the European Business School Ranking. In 2022, the Financial Times ranked Jönköping International Business School #88 in their European Business School Rankings.

Year	FT European Business School Ranking	FT Masters in Management Ranking
2024	74	61
2023	82	64
2022	88	84

QS TopUniversities

As of September 2025, QS ranks JIBS #151-200 globally in the "QS Business Master's Rankings 2026: Management", the 2nd best result for Swedish universities.

Eduniversal

In 2024, Eduniversal ranks JIBS an "Excellent Business School" (3 palms) with a deans' recommendation rate of 284 ‰ - the 4th highest in Sweden. In 2023, Eduniversal also ranked JIBS among "Excellent Business Schools" (3 palms) with a 154 ‰ deans' recommendation rate.

Ekonomistudenten.se

In 2011 Ekonomistudenten.se recognized JIBS as the #2 Business and Economics school in Sweden. In 2012, JIBS was again ranked as the #2 Business and Economics school by Ekonomistudenten.se.

URANK

In 2014, URANK (Sveriges universitetsranking) ranked JIBS as the #3 business school (tied with Lund University) in Sweden.

Academy of Management

In 2009 the Academy of Management recognized JIBS as #9 (#4 Non U.S) among the top 100 business schools in its report on research leadership in entrepreneurial research.

The Future of Business Schools

In 2010 ‘The Future of Business Schools’ ranked JIBS among ‘Top five academic management schools in Sweden’.

Confederation of Swedish Enterprise

In 2010 The Confederation of Swedish Enterprise (Högskolekvalitet), which provides information regarding the quality of study programs offered by Swedish universities, ranked JIBS as #1 in Sweden for international exchange.

== Accreditations ==
EQUIS

In March 2015 JIBS was accredited by EQUIS (European Quality Improvement System)

AACSB

In December 2015 JIBS was accredited by AACSB (Association to Advance Collegiate Schools of Business)

AMBA

In June 2025 JIBS was accredited by AMBA (Association of MBAs), awarding JIBS with the Triple Crown status

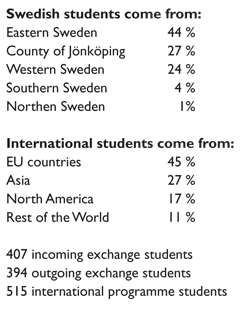
Student body statistics from: "A typical JIBS Student" by Jönköping University, 2010

== Internationalisation ==
With the exception of the one-year master's programmes, students of all undergraduate and master programmes have the possibility of studying abroad for at least one semester. JIBS has around 128 partner universities in around 45 countries all over the world and has been actively involved in Linnaeus Palme, Erasmus + and MFS - Minor Field Studies.

According to the Sweden Higher Education Authority, JIBS is home to the top five study programs in international exchange in Sweden. Out of the economics students 60% pursue a semester abroad and the current student body comprises students from 32 countries and one-third of the faculty is drawn from outside Scandinavia.

In 2020, out of the 1765 program students, 945 came from EU and non-EU countries outside of Sweden. JIBS had 107 incoming exchange students and 133 outgoing exchange students.

== Student societies ==
Societies run by students at JIBS include:

=== JIBS Student Association (JSA) ===
At Jönköping University each of the four schools have their own student association which organizes activities related to the schools' main profiles. JIBS Student Association (JSA) is Jönköping International Business School's student association. The President of JSA is represented on JIBS’ board.

=== International Association (IA) ===
The International Association of the Student Union works with internationalization and integration. It organizes social activities.

=== Swedish Society for Debate and Diplomacy (SSDD) ===
The Swedish Society for Debate and Diplomacy has participated in several international debates, conferences and research trips.

=== Society for International Affairs Jönköping (SIAJ) ===
Society of International Affairs (SIAJ) is a politically and religiously independent association aimed at spreading knowledge, increasing awareness and initiating debate about international affairs. Activities include: guest lectures, seminars and debates, field trips, movie club, discussion groups and study circles.

=== JIBS-United ===
JIBS-United is the student run magazine at JIBS, and is published by JSA.

=== Nordnet Trading Room ===
Nordnet Trading Room was established in collaboration with and funded by Nordnet Bank AB. It has free trading software and computers, with subscriptions to financial periodicals and television news available in the room.

== Deans ==
Deans since foundation in 1994.

Name	Deanship
Agne Boeryd	1994–1996
Leif Lindmark	1996–2000
Leif Melin	2000–2001
Rolf A. Lundin	2001–2007
Niclas Adler	2007–2010
Agneta Bladh	2011-2011
Johan Roos	2012–2015
Jerker Moodysson	2016–2024
Martin Wallin	2024-

== Partner universities (excerpt) ==
- Queensland University of Technology
- University of Southern Denmark
- Vienna University of Economics and Business
- HEC Montréal
- City University of Hong Kong
- Shanghai Jiao Tong University
- Aalto University School of Economics
- Hanken School of Economics
- EDHEC Business School
- EM Lyon
- KEDGE Business School
- Handelshochschule Leipzig (HHL)
- Universität Mannheim
- WHU – Otto Beisheim School of Management
- Bocconi University
- Universiteit Maastricht
- Universiteit van Tilburg
- VU University Amsterdam
- University of Waikato
- BI Norwegian Business School
- Singapore Management University
- University of Cape Town Graduate School of Business
- University of Stellenbosch
- Yonsei University
- University of St. Gallen
- Babson College
- Baylor University
- Universiteit Amsterdam
- Texas A&M University
- University of California, Davis
- University of Wisconsin at Milwaukee
