= Journal of Business Venturing =

- Subject: Entrepreneurship
- Language: English
- Edited by: Jeffery McMullen

Publication details
- History: 1985–present
- Publisher: Elsevier (USA)
- Frequency: Bimonthly
- Impact factor: 8.7 (2022)

Standard abbreviations
- ISO 4: J. Bus. Ventur.

Indexing
- CODEN: JBVEEP
- ISSN: 0883-9026
- LCCN: sf93092354
- OCLC no.: 950513622

Links
- Journal Home Page & Article Summaries; All Articles & Issues

The Journal of Business Venturing is a bimonthly peer-reviewed multidisciplinary academic journal publishing research on all aspects of entrepreneurship. Its scope spans the disciplines of economics, psychology, and sociology. It was established in 1985 by Ian MacMillan and is published by Elsevier. The editor-in-chief is Jeff McMullen (Indiana University). According to the Journal Citation Reports, the journal has a 2022 impact factor of 8.7 It is one of the 50 journals that the Financial Times uses to compile its business school rankings.

The journal summary website (externally facing) is www.JournalOfBusinessVenturing.com

Since 2014 the journal has awarded the "Journal of Business Venturing Best Paper Award".
