= Academy of Management =

Professional association for scholars of management and organizations

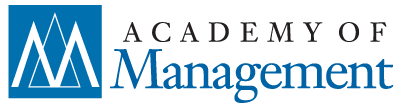
- Formation: 1936
- Type: Professional association
- Purpose: Advancement of management research, education, and practice
- Headquarters: Valhalla, New York
- Location: Global
- Members: Nearly 20,000 members across 120+ countries
- Official language: English
- President: Peter A. Bamberger
- Immediate Past President: Sharon Alvarez
- President-Elect: Tammy L. Madsen
- Vice President/Program Chair: Christopher L. Tucci
- Website: aom.org

The Academy of Management is a professional association for scholars of management and organizations, established in 1936. It publishes several academic journals, organizes international conferences, and provides forums for management professors and practitioners to exchange research, insights, and ideas.

== Publications ==
The academy publishes the following academic journals:

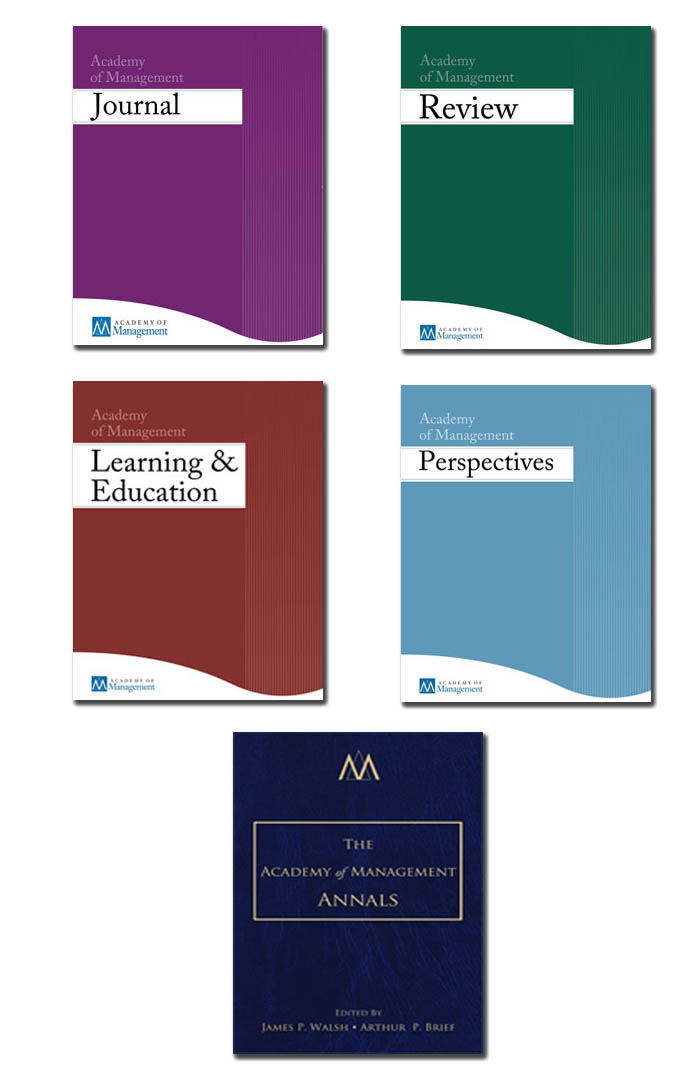
AOM Journal Covers 2012

- Academy of Management Journal
- Academy of Management Review
- Academy of Management Perspectives (formerly Academy of Management Executive)
- Academy of Management Learning and Education
- Academy of Management Annals
- Academy of Management Discoveries
- Academy of Management Collections
- Academy of Management Insights

The first three journals were ranked in the top 40 business journals in the world in 2006 by the Financial Times.

== See also ==
- Human resources development
- Human resource management
- Industrial and organizational psychology
- Industrial sociology
