= Corporate venturing =

Creation of new businesses by established companies

Corporate venturing is the creation of new businesses by an established company, or its investment in and cooperation with young companies, undertaken to enter new markets, obtain access to new technologies or renew its existing activities. In the management literature it is treated as a subcategory of corporate entrepreneurship, the wider set of entrepreneurial activities carried out within an existing organisation. Reference-work treatments situate corporate venturing within firms' broader pursuit of open innovation, in which companies increasingly seek innovation through engagement with external partners alongside their own research and development.

In an influential 1999 paper, Pramodita Sharma and James J. Chrisman divided corporate entrepreneurship into strategic renewal, meaning changes to a company's existing business activities, structures or strategies, and corporate venturing, meaning activities that create new businesses for the corporation through internal or external ventures; the subsequent subdivision of corporate venturing into internal and external types is generally attributed to later work by Morris and co-authors. Corporate venture capital, in which a company takes minority equity stakes in external start-ups, is a widely studied form and has been the subject of its own systematic reviews. Terminology in the field has remained contested, and the demarcation of corporate entrepreneurship has been described as a source of confusion.

Corporate venturing activity has occurred in distinct waves since the late 1960s. Assessments of its results are mixed: corporate ventures have been found to require several years to reach profitability, while a large-sample study found corporate venture investments to be at least as successful as those backed by independent venture capital organizations, though corporate programmes lacking a strategic focus were markedly shorter-lived.

== Definition and classification ==
Sharma and Chrisman defined internal corporate venturing as activities resulting in "the creation of organizational entities that reside within an existing organizational domain", and external corporate venturing as activities that "reside outside the existing organizational domain". A 2025 systematic analysis of the field noted that their scheme distinguished only strategic renewal from corporate venturing, and that the internal–external subdivision of venturing was introduced by later authors.

Morgan P. Miles and Jeffrey G. Covin, drawing on a field study of corporations active in venturing and based in the United Kingdom or the United States, classified corporate venturing into four generic forms according to the focus of entrepreneurship and the presence of investment intermediation: direct-internal, direct-external, indirect-internal and indirect-external venturing.

Corporate venture capital is defined in reference-work treatments as equity investment in privately held entrepreneurial ventures by established firms, distinguished by three characteristics: the pursuit of strategic objectives beyond financial return, the independence of the funded ventures from the investing corporation, and the taking of minority rather than controlling stakes. Treatments differ on the outer boundary of external corporate venturing: Thomas Keil, for example, includes outright acquisitions alongside corporate venture capital and alliances.

== Forms ==
=== Internal corporate venturing ===
Internal corporate venturing covers new businesses created within an existing company's own boundaries. Robert A. Burgelman's study of a large diversified firm produced a process model of internal corporate venturing and a companion analysis of alternative organisational designs for corporate entrepreneurship in established firms. Susan A. Hill and Sotirios Georgoulas reviewed almost five decades of research on the subject.

=== External corporate venturing ===
External corporate venturing covers arrangements through which a company engages with ventures it does not wholly own. Keil, studying large European information and communications technology firms, treated external corporate venturing as spanning corporate venture capital, alliances and acquisitions, and analysed it as a learning-based organisational capability that firms must build over time. Related work has examined the conditions under which external corporate ventures generate explorative as opposed to exploitative learning for the parent firm.

Edward B. Roberts described arrangements in which small technology-based firms were paired with the capital and distribution capabilities of large corporations, alongside internal ventures established as separate entities to address new markets. Such partnerships may take the form of a joint venture.

More recent work has described venture builders, organisations that create ventures in series, as an approach distinct from business incubators and Business accelerator.

== Organisational arrangements ==
During the first wave of corporate venturing activity, about a quarter of Fortune 500 companies in the United States adopted formal corporate venturing programmes, typically operating them through dedicated venturing units.

Research on the dedicated new venture division found that systematic differences in administrative processes, strategy-making and participants' orientation created problems at the interfaces between such a division and the rest of the corporation.

Robert C. Wolcott and Michael J. Lippitz described four models of corporate entrepreneurship, distinguished by whether organisational ownership of new business creation is focused in a designated group or diffused across the organisation, and whether resource authority rests on a dedicated corporate funding pool or is granted on an ad hoc basis. They labelled the resulting models the Opportunist, the Enabler, the Advocate and the Producer.

== History ==
=== First wave ===
The first wave of corporate venturing activity ran from the late 1960s to the early 1970s, with many programmes abandoned in the late 1970s. Norman D. Fast documented the establishment and subsequent decline of corporate new venture divisions in The Rise and Fall of Corporate New Venture Divisions and later assessed the future of such departments.

Ralph Biggadike's analysis of corporate ventures, drawing on Fortune 500 data and the Profit Impact of Market Strategies database, reported that corporate ventures on average suffered severe losses through their first four years of operation, and that new ventures needed approximately eight years to reach profitability and ten to twelve years before their return on investment matched that of mature businesses.

=== Second and third waves ===
A second wave of activity followed in the early 1980s and a third in the late 1990s. Henry W. Chesbrough observed that corporate venture capital investment expanded sharply during the internet boom of the late 1990s and contracted afterwards, and argued that investments made for primarily financial reasons with a loose link to the parent's businesses dried up in a downturn, while those tied to strategic objectives showed greater staying power.

Paul A. Gompers and Josh Lerner examined 32,364 investments by corporate and independent venture organisations, in what remains one of the largest studies of corporate venture capital outcomes.

=== Later research ===
Reviewing the field in 2009, V. K. Narayanan, Yi Yang and Shaker A. Zahra described a "rapidly growing but fragmented body of literature" on corporate venturing and proposed a framework linking venturing to value creation. Subsequent studies examined the conditions under which corporate venture capital investment is associated with higher rates of innovation in the investing firm and with the creation of firm value. Later systematic reviews have synthesised four decades of corporate venture capital research and consolidated empirical work published between 1987 and 2023 into a framework of programme design dimensions.

== Performance and outcomes ==
Gompers and Lerner found that corporate venture investments in entrepreneurial firms appeared "at least as successful (using such measures as the probability of the portfolio firm going public) as those backed by independent venture organizations", particularly where there was a strategic overlap between the parent corporation and the portfolio company. Corporate investors paid valuation premiums for the ventures they backed, but did not pay higher premiums in strategically aligned deals. In their sample, corporate venture capital programmes had a mean duration of 2.5 years and a median duration of one year, against 7.1 and eight years respectively for independent venture organisations; programmes without a strong strategic focus were "very unstable, frequently ceasing operations after only a few investments", whereas strategically focused programmes appeared as stable as independent venture organisations.

Jeffrey G. Covin and Morgan P. Miles, drawing on a review and a field study of fifteen corporations in Sweden, the United Kingdom and the United States, argued that considerable ambiguity exists about what it means to pursue corporate venturing strategically, with the result that many companies fail to leverage it fully for strategic purposes.

== Challenges and criticism ==
Frequently identified difficulties include the structural tension between venture units and the parent organisation, arising from differences in administrative processes and orientation, a phenomenon related to what has been termed the corporate immune system. Biggadike's finding on the long period before corporate ventures reach profitability is among the most widely discussed results in the field. A 2024 systematic review cites the high rate of early abandonment of corporate venture capital programmes as a motivation for research into how such programmes are designed.

Corporate venture capital activity has been described as pro-cyclical, expanding in favourable market conditions and contracting in downturns, with financially motivated programmes the most exposed. Reviewing four decades of corporate venture capital research through the lens of paradox theory, Euiju Jeon and Markku Maula identified three persistent tensions: between exploration through venturing and exploitation in the core business; in the simultaneous belonging of venturing programmes to the corporate parent and to the start-up and venture capital community; and in start-ups and venture capital firms viewing corporate programmes as both a threat and an opportunity.

Research has also examined the risks that corporate venturing poses to the ventures themselves. Riitta Katila, Jeff D. Rosenberger and Kathleen M. Eisenhardt, studying tie formation across five United States technology sectors over 25 years, found that technology ventures entered relationships with established corporations when they needed resources such firms uniquely provided, but did so principally where they held defence mechanisms, such as secrecy and timing, against misappropriation of their own resources by corporate partners.

== See also ==
- Corporate accelerator
- Venture client
- Startup studio
- Corporate spin-off
- Skunkworks project
