= Numbrs Personal Finance =

Swiss financial technology company

Numbrs Personal Finance AG
- Company type: Aktiengesellschaft
- Industry: Financial technology
- Founded: 2012; 14 years ago
- Headquarters: Baar, Switzerland
- Area served: Germany and Switzerland
- Key people: Martin Saidler (Executive chairman)
- Products: Bitcoin storage, account aggregation
- Number of employees: 70
- Website: www.numbrs.com

Numbrs Personal Finance AG (formerly known as Centralway Numbrs) is a financial technology company based in Switzerland. The company offers offline storage solution for bitcoins but used to provide an app called Numbrs that aggregates bank accounts and credit card information and facilitates mobile banking and personal financial planning used in Germany and the UK.

== History ==
The company was founded in 2012 by Julien Arnold, along with Dennis Just and Johannes Hübner, in a corporate accelerator controlled by Martin Saidler's company, Centralway. The company's product was inspired by the Mint app, a bank account aggregating app available in the US at that time. Arnold left the company in 2015.

The company demonstrated its app in 2013 at a financial technology conference, and it launched in Germany in 2014.

When it was first launched in 2014, the app could be used for mobile banking, aggregating any number of bank accounts, handling banking transactions, classifying records of spendings, and preparing financial plans. In November 2014 it had two stars out of five in the Apple app store.

In 2015 German consumer magazine Finanztest gave the app a score of "unsatisfactory" because the company retained customers' data on its servers, which raised consumer privacy concerns.

As of January 2017 the company had raised $125 million from investors including Saidler's family office, which was the majority shareholder, Marcel Ospel, Sir Ronald Cohen, Josef Ackermann, Alan Howard, and the Investment Corporation of Dubai; the company also said that 1.5m accounts had been entered into the app by that time.

Early in 2017 the company struck deals with three German banks, Postbank, Norisbank, and SWK Bank, that allowed the app to work with accounts from those banks so that users could compare the terms of various banking-related offers and apply for an account, a loan or a credit card directly via the app. Numbrs' business plan had been to generate revenue by getting paid by banking partners when users generate new business through the app through arrangements like this, and this was the company's first set of such money-making arrangements.

In March 2017 the company hired Oyvind Oanes as its CEO, and in June 2017 it cut about a third of its workforce.

In November 2017 the company changed its name from "Centralway Numbrs" to "Numbrs Personal Finance AG".

In May 2018 Oyvind Oanes stepped down as CEO and left the company.

In May 2020 the company announced a restructuring with the goal of reducing their workforce by almost 50 percent (62 employees).

The company pivoted to provide Bitcoin offline storage solutions from a dedicated data centre based in Zug.
