= Linguatec =

The Linguatec Sprachtechnologien GmbH is a language technology provider, specialized in the field of machine translation, speech synthesis and speech recognition. Linguatec was founded in Munich in 1996 and its headquarters are in Pasing.

Linguatec has won the European Information Society Technologies Prize three times.

On their website, they are now using the online service Voice Reader Web, so that the information can be read out in every language by means of a text-to-speech function.

== Core areas ==
- Machine translation

The different versions of Personal Translator (seven language pairs) can be used "for home use" or for professional business use in the company network. In addition to this, specialist dictionaries are offered to broaden standard vocabulary.

- Speech synthesis

The Voice Reader text-to-speech program reads in twelve languages: German, British English, American English, French, Quebec French, Spanish, Mexican Spanish, Italian, Dutch, Portuguese, Czech, Chinese.

- Speech recognition

Voice Pro is based on ViaVoice technology from IBM. There are special software programs for doctors and lawyers.

== Patents ==
- 2005 pending patent application for a newly developed hybrid technology that uses the intelligence of neural networks for machine translation.

== Awards ==
- 2004 European IT Prize for Beyond Babel
- 2004 test winner Stiftung Warentest – best voice recognition
- 1998 European IT Prize – applied voice recognition
- 1996 European IT Prize – automated translation

== Studies ==
- 2005 University of Regensburg: Voice Reader user test
- 2002 Fraunhofer Institute for Industrial Engineering and Organization IAO: user study on the efficiency of machine translation
