= Martin Saidler =

Vienna-born Swiss businessman and entrepreneur

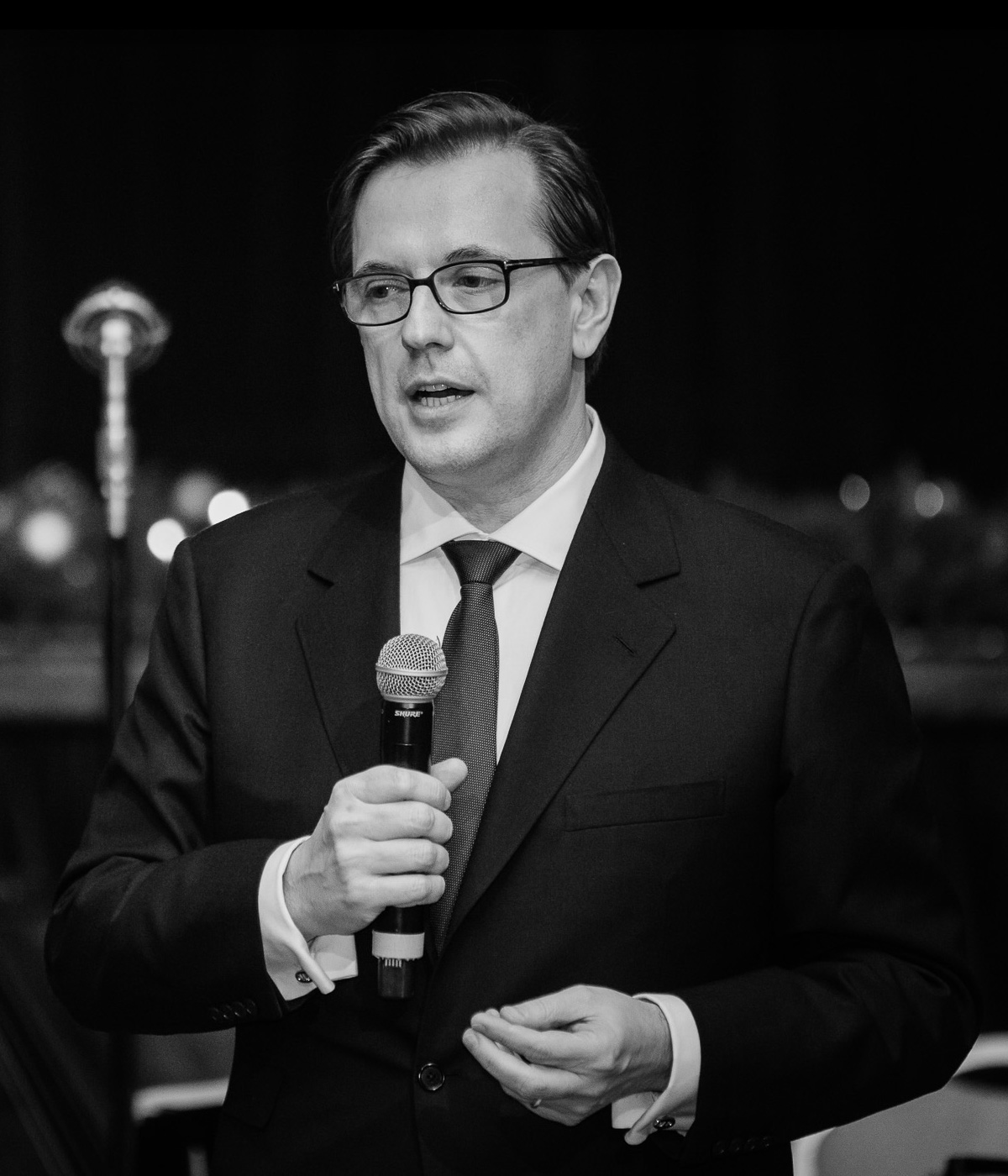
- Born: 1967 (age 58–59); Vienna, Austria
- Education: University of Vienna
- Occupations: Businessman, venture capitalist
- Known for: Founder of German employment website Jobinteractive.com

Martin Saidler is a Vienna-born Swiss businessman and investor in internet and financial technology companies. He has done most of his investing in central Europe, working mostly through a holding company called Centralway, and subsequently through a family office called Saidler & Co.

== Career ==
Martin Saidler was born in Vienna, Austria in 1967. His mother came from Slovakia and he grew up speaking Slovak at home. He attended the University of Vienna where he studied journalism and political science. He then moved to Berlin where in 1997 he founded the employment website Jobinteractive.com. In 1998, it became one of the major job portals in Germany. In 1999, Beisheim Holding Switzerland (BHS) acquired Jobinteractive.com. BHS combined it with other businesses in a company called Scout24. Saidler stayed with the company until around 2001, scouting opportunities for them in central Europe, and cashed out just before the dot-com bubble burst.

Saidler used that money, along with money from a Luxembourg fund called Incubation Capital SARL, as capital for the investment company Centralway AG, based in Zug, Switzerland, and developed it into one of the largest Internet corporate groups in central Europe. Through 2010, his investment strategy was to invest mostly in central Europe, in companies controlled by their founders that were making money and leading in their field; he would help them grow for three to four years, then seek an exit. Many of these transactions were among private companies, so the sources of investment and the amounts of money spent and earned are not known.

By 2011 Saidler determined that the market for IT companies in central Europe had become overpriced, so Centralway sold off most of its investments, stopped making new investments there, and starting looking at investments inside Switzerland, at a time when there was a rising market of internet-based startups in Switzerland. Centralway entered the Swiss market by acquiring an internet agency called Netvision and making it a subsidiary of Centralway, initially called "Centralway Factory", intended to be a corporate accelerator. The company Centralway Numbrs was founded in the accelerator in 2012 to create an app for mobile banking; its founder was Julien Arnold.

In 2013 Saidler set up a venture capital fund called Centralway Ventures based in Switzerland but operating in the UK; it made an investment in Buttercoin. As of January 2018 the fund was closed down.

In 2013, Saidler founded Saidler & Co. as a family office that operated through three arms; Statmentt, which invested in fintech companies, an investment fund, and a real estate investment fund operating in Switzerland, Austria and Hungary. Saidler invested in Centralway's businesses through his family office.

The Numbrs app, which aggregated a person's banking and credit card information in one app, was demonstrated at a fintech conference in 2013, then launched in Germany in 2014. Centralway began focusing on fintech. By January 2017 the company said that people had entered about 1.5 million accounts into the Numbrs app and the company had raised about $125 million, and the majority shareholder was Saidler's family office. In June 2017 the company cut about a third of its workforce.

In 2015 Saidler traveled to Israel, seeking investors and investment opportunities in Silicon Wadi, especially in financial technology. Boaz Barak, whom he knew from the Swiss banking industry, retired to Israel and became Saidler's liaison there.

In 2020, such problems were disputes with former employees about unpaid wages, drastic staff cuts and the abolition of the office in favor of remote work.
