= Tenhagen =

Tenhagen is a surname. Notable people with the surname include:

- Franz-Josef Tenhagen (born 1952), German footballer and manager
- Hermann-Josef Tenhagen (born 1963), German CEO
