= Virtual business incubator =

Business incubators began in the 1950s and took off in the late 1990s as support for startup companies who need advice and venture capital to get their ideas off the ground. As the dot-com bubble burst, many high-tech business incubators did so too. Today, the model of a business incubator is changing. Several of the incubator companies who survived the dot-com bubble switched to a virtual model.

A definition of a virtual incubator is provided by IdeaGist as: In a broader sense, virtual incubators can be defined as a catalyst for socio-economic development, providing a process for developing early stage ideas into viable ventures. They offer formal and informal learning opportunities and connect entrepreneurs to an ecosystem of related services. While virtual incubators are still getting defined in a fast-changing world, they have a potential of disrupting the traditional business incubation model.

The traditional incubator model requires a startup venture to set up shop at the incubator's site. The virtual model, on the other hand, allows a company to garner the advice of an incubator without physically being located at the incubator site. This new model suits those entrepreneurs who need the advice an incubator offers but still want to maintain their own offices, warehouses, etc. One example of a fully virtual incubator is the One Million by One Million initiative.

Several state and local governments in the United States are working with or creating their own virtual business incubators to attract new business.

Higher Education institutions such as Auburn University and Springfield Technical Community College are now offering virtual business incubation of some kind, with most of them offering a big library of resources, and some even offering the use of physical facilities.

A global list of current and past virtual incubators is published by IdeaGist with 80 entries but many of them are either defunct or not offering virtual incubation services.

== See also ==
- Business incubator
- Seed accelerator
- A simpler definition of a Virtual Business Incubator
