= Gersfeld =

- Town
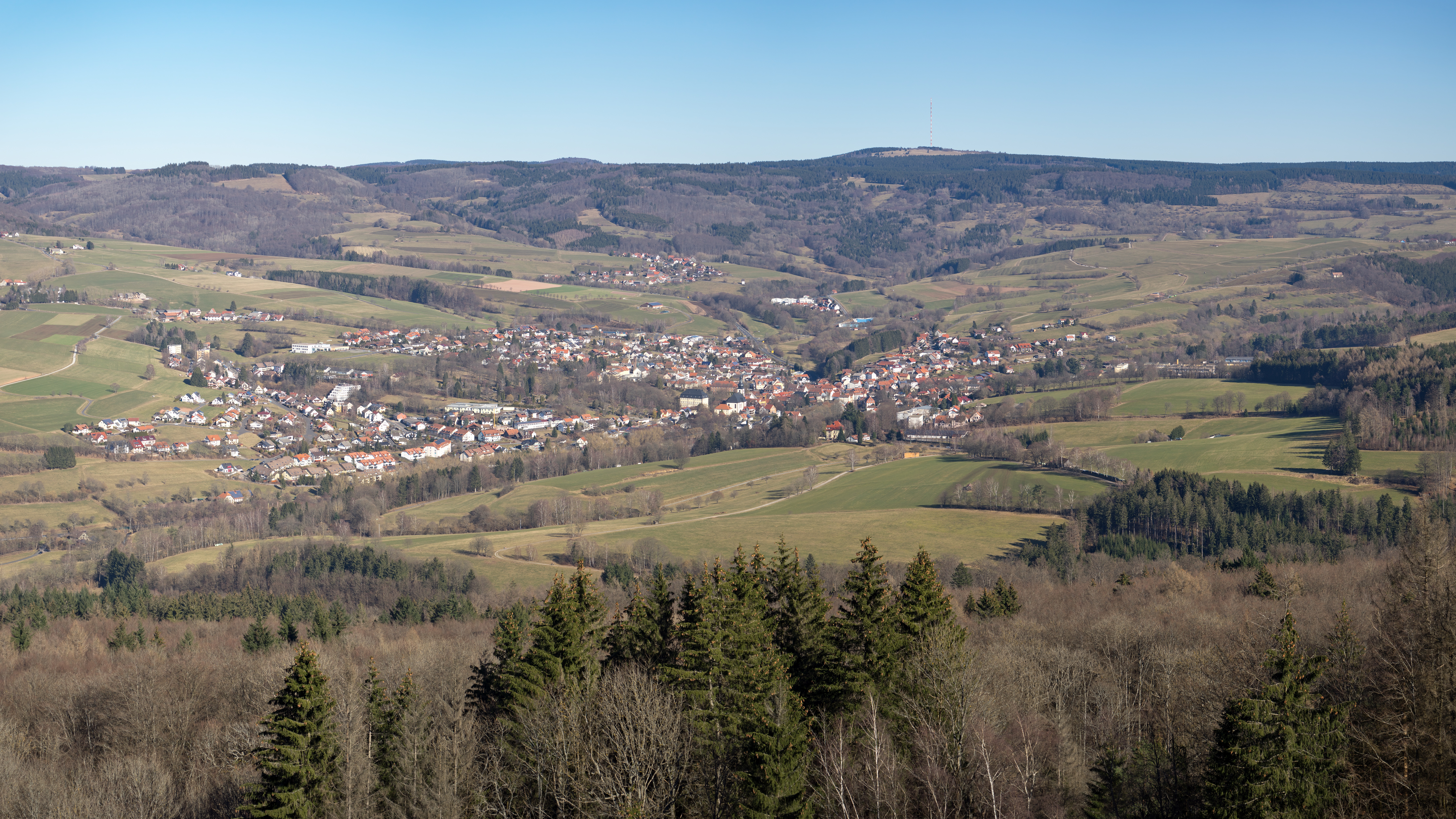
- Gersfeld

- Coat of arms

- Location of Gersfeld within Fulda district
- Interactive map of Gersfeld
- Location within Germany Location within Hesse
- Coordinates: 50°27′N 09°55′E
- Country: Germany
- State: Hesse
- Admin. region: Kassel
- District: Fulda

Government
  - Mayor (2021–27): Steffen Korell (CDU)

Area
  - Total: 89.34 km^{2} (34.49 sq mi)
- Elevation: 371–950 m (1,217–3,117 ft)

Population (2025-12-31)
  - Total: 5,371
  - Density: 60.12/km^{2} (155.7/sq mi)
- Time zone: UTC+01:00 (CET)
  - Summer (DST): UTC+02:00 (CEST)
- Postal codes: 36129
- Dialling codes: 06654, 06656
- Vehicle registration: FD
- Website: www.gersfeld.de

Gersfeld (German pronunciation: [ˈɡɛʁsfɛlt]) is a town in the Fulda district of Hesse, Germany, on the Fulda River in the Rhön Mountains, 20 km (12.43 mi) southeast of Fulda. It belonged to the abbey-principality of Fulda before secularisation in 1803. It then belonged to the Principality of Nassau-Orange-Fulda between 1803 and 1806, to France between 1806 and 1810, and then later to the Grand Duchy of Frankfurt between 1810 and 1813. After the Battle of Leipzig, it was occupied by the Allied troops of the Sixth Coalition between 1813 and 1815. After that, it was ceded to the Kingdom of Bavaria in 1815. During the Austro-Prussian War, it was occupied by Prussia before its annexation in the newly established Hesse Nassau province. It was finally incorporated in the state of Hesse in 1945.

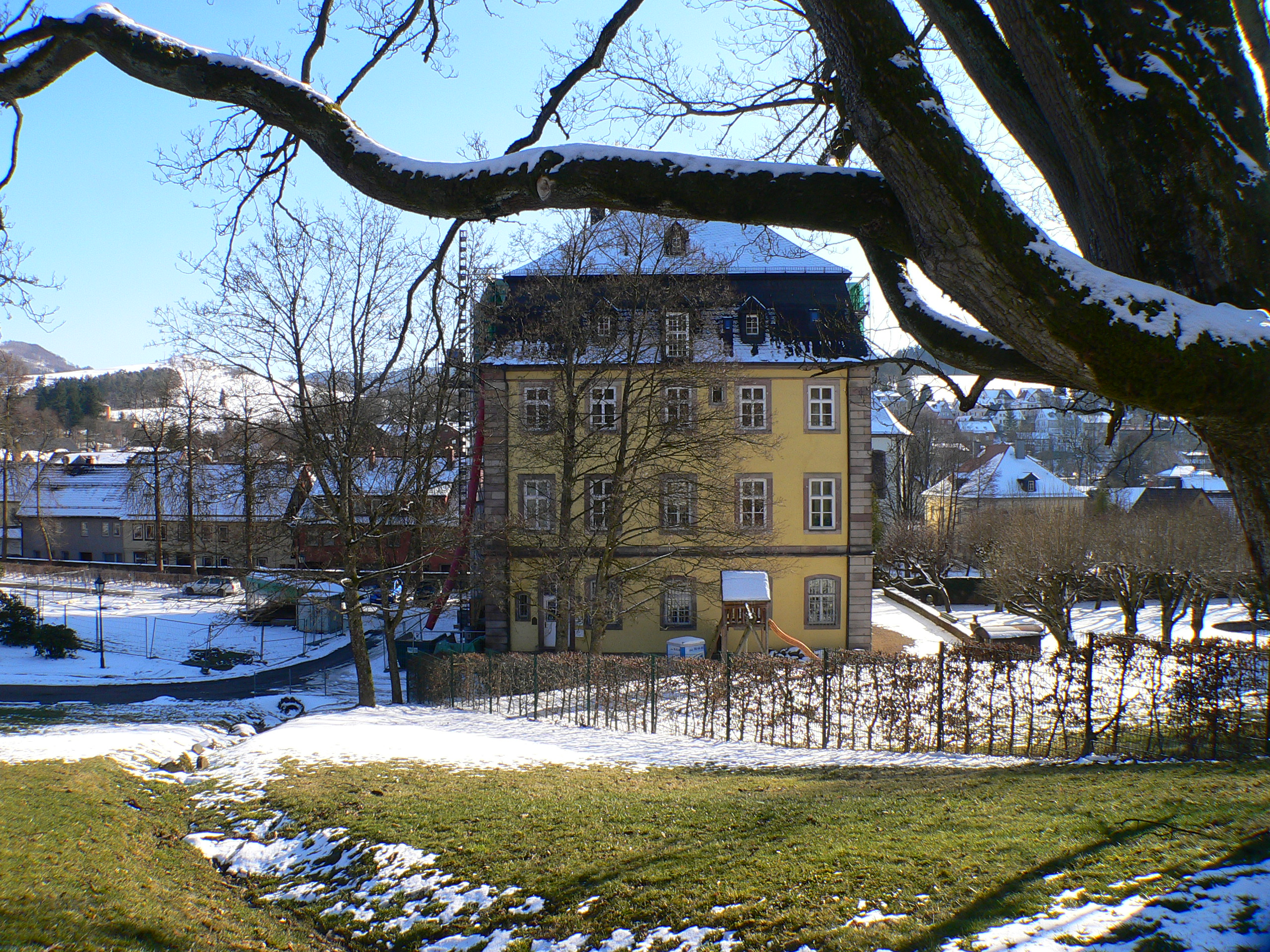
Baroque castle

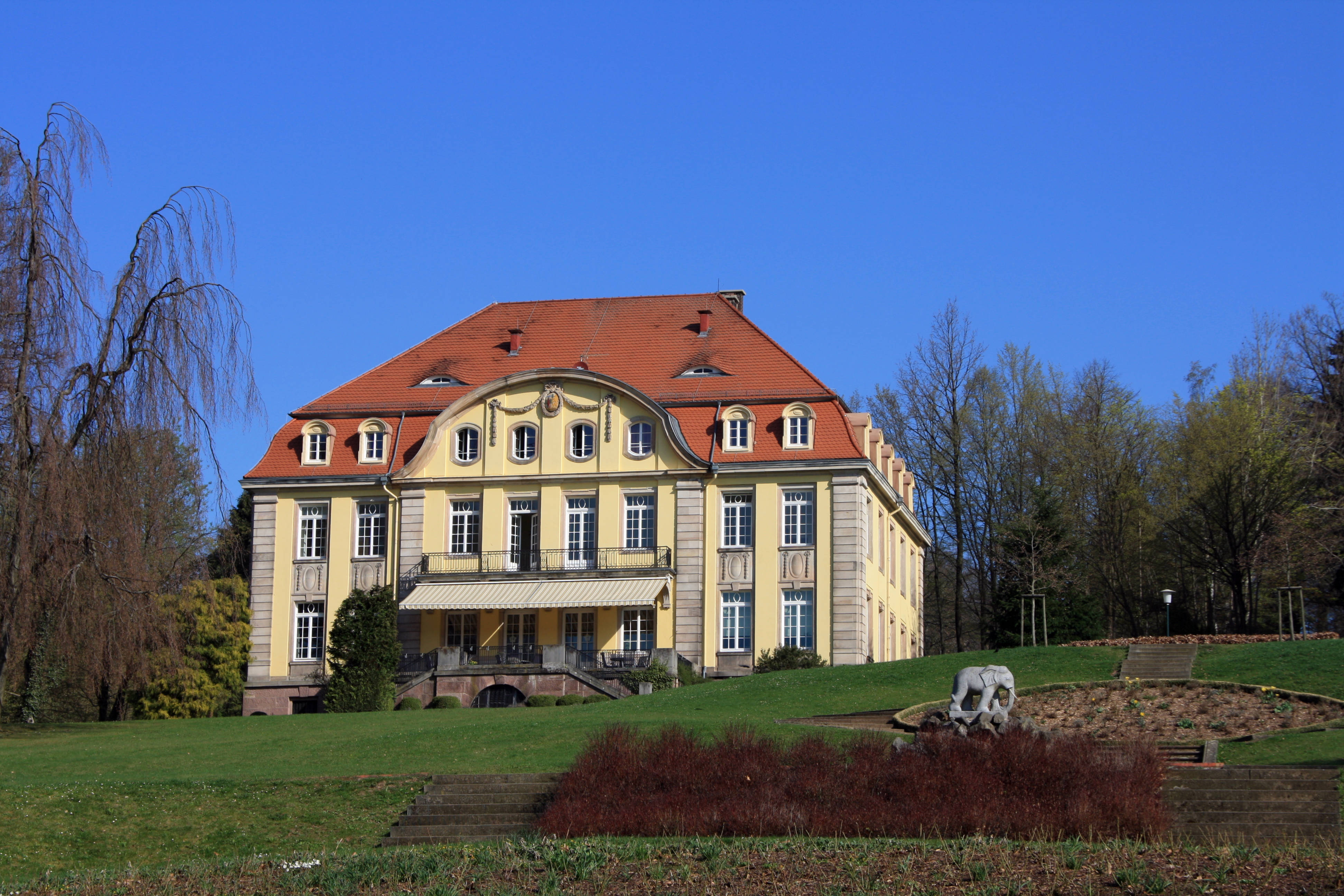
Clinic in castle park

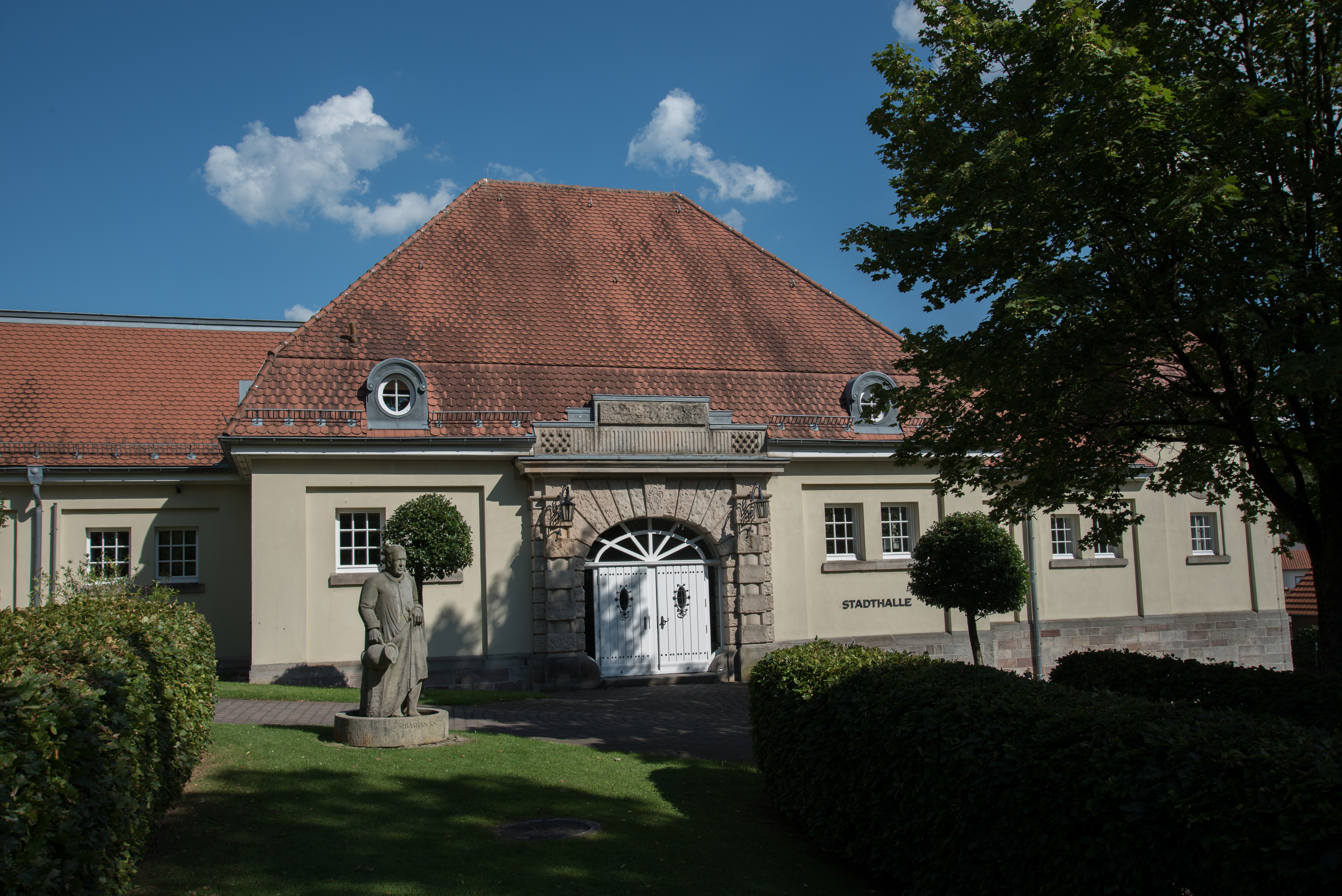
Castle park

== Notable people ==
- Helmut Bieler (born 1940), composer and pianist
- Hubertus Primus (born 1955), lawyer and journalist, executive committee of the Stiftung Warentest
