= Finanztest =

German consumer magazine

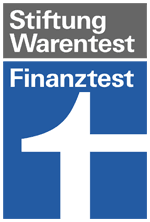
- Finanztest (German magazine)
- Editor-in-Chief: Hermann-Josef Tenhagen
- Former editors: Hubertus Primus
- Categories: Business, finance, consumer protection
- Frequency: Monthly
- Publisher: Stiftung Warentest, Berlin (Germany)
- Total circulation (2021): 211,000 test.de – Auflagenzahlen Finanztest, 10 August 2021
- Founded: 1991
- Company: Stiftung Warentest
- Country: Germany; 52.50417°N 13.35333°E
- Based in: Berlin
- Language: German
- Website: www.finanztest.de
- ISSN: 0939-1614

Finanztest (originally FINANZtest) is a consumer magazine which focuses on providing objective information about financial services. Together with test it is one of the two main publications of Stiftung Warentest, the German foundation and consumer organisation.

== General background ==
Finanztest was first published in 1991. It has appeared monthly since 1997, and at the present time has a circulation of 251,000 copies per month. However, according to a survey by Allensbach, a well-known institute for public opinion research, each issue is actually read by 1.3 million readers. Approximately 205,000 copies are sold to subscribers and 46,000 at newsstands every month. The magazine is free of adverts in order to ensure that it is totally independent of manufacturer influence. Hermann-Josef Tenhagen has been the editor-in-chief since 1999.

There are five main thematic sections in the magazine: "Legal and Everyday Life Issues", "Investment and Provision for Retirement", "Home and Living", "Tax", "Health and Insurance". It publishes the results of investigations of financial services, for example insurance, investment products and loans, as well as advice about tax and legal issues. Every month there is an extensive section providing a comparison of interest rates for various savings products, shares and investment funds, as well as loans for buying property or a car.

In addition to the regular magazine, there are several special issues each year dealing in more detail with topics of particular interest. In the recent past these included financial advice for the self-employed, taking care of elderly parents, and maximising tax refunds. The Finanztest Yearbook with summaries of the year's investigations comes out every December. Details of all the investigations and reports can of course be downloaded, in part as a paid-for service. There are also product picker databases for investment funds and statutory health insurance that are continuously updated.

== Working procedures and effects of its investigations ==
The published data and reports are based on the investigations of the financial and insurance products on the market which are carried out using scientific methods by the foundation's own staff. There was a total of 85 investigations in 2010.

Since more and more companies do not wish to be surveyed and refuse to provide the information requested, Stiftung Warentest now also evaluates databases and business reports, as well as relying on private providers as sources of data. In addition, specifically trained freelancers often act as customers. Mystery shoppers for example played an important role in testing out the investment advice services of banks (issue 08/2010) and the statutory health insurance providers (issue 09/2010).

Finanztest's investigations very definitely have an effect on both providers and politicians. For example, as a result of unfavourable results, consumer unfriendly financial services, such as some of the private health insurance tariffs, have been taken off the market. Following repeated criticism, more customer friendly terms and conditions have also been introduced by providers offering occupational disability insurance. As a consequence of several investigations published in Finanztest, Ilse Aigner, the Federal Minister for Consumer Protection announced in December 2010 that she also intends to make use of mystery shoppers to check the reliability of investment advice offered by banks.

== Advertising with investigation results ==
If they agree to abide by the specified terms and conditions and pay a one-off fee, providers are allowed to advertise using Stiftung Warentest's overall verdicts on quality and the Foundation's logos.

Finanztest's official logos as used in advertising:

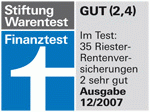
Logo of the magazine Finanztest, landscape format, narrow

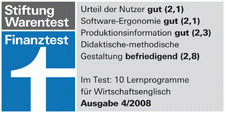
Logo of the magazine Finanztest, landscape format, wide

Logo of the magazine Finanztest, portrait format

== "Riester" – mistakes and their consequence ==
Stiftung Warentest has a reputation for providing accurate and reliable information with relevance for consumers. If mistakes are made, the Foundation deals with them openly and honestly, as was the case in 2002, with the publication of the incorrectly calculated results for the Riester-Rente (a state-subsidised privately funded pension introduced and named after the German politician Walter Riester). The complete issue of Finanztest was withdrawn and a public apology was made. The investigation was repeated, and the new results were published. In addition, they were also made available free of charge online. It was the first and only time in the then almost 40-year history of the Foundation that this happened – over 100,000 copies of the magazine with the corrected information were subsequently sold at newsstands and it was the most popular Finanztest issue that year.

Since 2005, Finanztest has published reports every year on its latest investigations of the various Riester state-subsidised pension schemes, the Riester fund savings plans and Riester bank savings plans. Stiftung Warentest's financial experts have regularly carried out investigations of Riester loans and also the Riester home pension scheme since it was introduced.

== See also ==
- List of magazines in Germany
