= Werner Brinkmann =

German executive

Werner Brinkmann (born 10 December 1946) was a German executive who served as the executive director and sole member of the board of Stiftung Warentest till 2011, the German foundation and consumer organisation, which was established in 1964.

== Early life and education ==
Werner Brinkmann was born and grew up in Hamm (North Rhine-Westphalia), Germany. After passing his school leaving exams (Abitur) in 1966, he then studied law at the University of Freiburg and University of Münster. He passed his first state law exam in 1970, and the second state law exam in 1975. In the same year he also completed his doctoral degree at the University of Münster with a dissertation titled The consumer organisations in the Federal Republic of Germany and their activity in technical standardisation, thus becoming a Doctor of Laws.

== Professional career ==
From 1975 to 1979 he was Head of the Administration and Legal Department at Stiftung Warentest in Berlin. Following this he worked at Deutschlandfunk, the radio broadcasting station, till 1992, where he also became the Senior Head of Human Resources, Legal Affairs and Licenses.

In 1981, he was appointed member of Stiftung Warentest's Advisory Council, and then between 1992 and the end of 1994 he was a member of the Foundation's Board. When the Executive Director Roland Hüttenrauch retired in 1995, Werner Brinkmann succeeded him in this position. His appointment was extended for a further five years in 2006.

In December 2009, Ilse Aigner, the Federal Minister of Consumer Protection, agreed to increase the Foundation's capital by 50 million euros by 2012 as a result of his initiative Werner Brinkmann is due to retire at the end of 2011. Hubertus Primus, the current Editor-in-chief, is the successor since 1 January 2012.

== Other biographical details ==
He is member of the board of International Consumer Research & Testing, member of the Management Board of Verbraucherzentrale Bundesverband (vzbv) and member of the Steering Committee of Deutsche Kommission Elektrotechnik Elektronik Informationstechnik im DIN und VDE (DKE).

Werner Brinkmann has been a member of the Presidial Board of the Deutsches Institut für Normung (DIN) since 1995. In 2000, he was awarded the Environmental Prize by the German Association of Environmental Management (B.A.U.M.). In December 2011 he was awarded the Cross of the Order of Merit of the Federal Republic of Germany.

He is not an active member of any political party. He lives together with his wife and son in Berlin-Zehlendorf.

== Selected publications ==
- Werner Brinkmann, Peter Sieber: Gebrauchstauglichkeit, Gebrauchswert und Qualität, in: Handbuch Qualitätsmanagement, Masing, published by Tilo Pfeifer and Robert Schmitt, fifth, completely revised edition, Hanser-Verlag, Munich (2007), pp. 777 to 786, ISBN 978-3-446-40752-7
- Rechtliche Aspekte der Bedeutung von technischen Normen für den Verbraucherschutz, Deutsches Institut für Normung e.V. Beuth, Berlin / Cologne 1984, ISBN 3-410-10845-9
- Die Verbraucherorganisation in der Bundesrepublik Deutschland und ihre Tätigkeit bei der überbetrieblichen technischen Normung, Heymann, Cologne / Berlin / Bonn / Munich 1976, ISBN 3-452-18149-9
