= Hubertus Primus =

German lawyer, journalist and manager

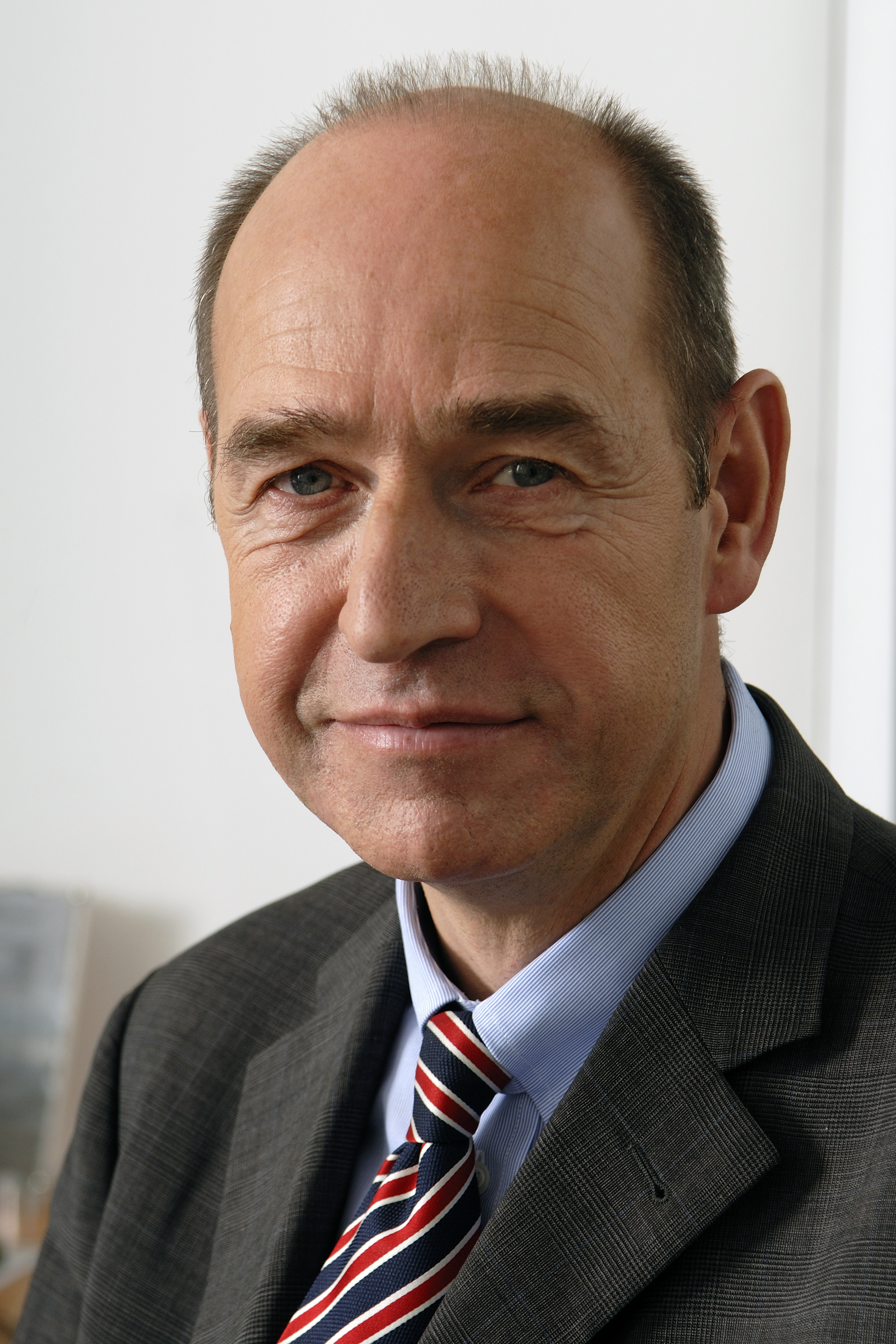
in 2007

Hubertus Primus (born 1 September 1955) is a German lawyer, journalist and manager. He was the editor-in-chief of the magazine test and is executive director and a member of the management board of Stiftung Warentest, the German consumer organisation.

Primus was born in Gersfeld (Rhön), West Germany, the son of a former mayor of Gersfeld.

After his law studies at the Free University of Berlin, where he qualified as a lawyer in 1986, Hubertus Primus worked for Rechtsmagazin für die Wirtschaft till 1988, followed by two years as a freelance journalist specialising in legal issues and taxes for the Industriemagazin and Süddeutsche Zeitung. He then worked for Stiftung Warentest's magazine Finanztest where he was promoted to its editor-in-chief in 1993. In 1999 he became the editor-in-chief of Stiftung Warentest's other magazine test and head of the Publications Division, as well as a member of the management board.

In March 2011, it was announced that Hubertus Primus would be appointed Stiftung Warentest's next executive director and successor to Werner Brinkmann as from 2012 – this was confirmed at the annual press conference on 12 May 2011.

Hubertus Primus and his wife, who was also born in Gerlsfeld, have four children. He is a board member of the Berlin sports club Zehlendorfer Wespen, responsible for marketing and public relations.

== Selected publications ==
- Journalismus im Doppelpass von Internet und Zeitschrift, in: Der Kampf um die Öffentlichkeit – Wie das Internet die Macht zwischen Medien, Unternehmen und Verbrauchern neu verteilt, Verlag Luchterhand, Neuwied, Kriftel (2002), pp. 133 to 141
- Der GmbH-Geschäftsführer – Rechte und Pflichten – Gründung und Organisation – Bilanz und Steuern – Formulare und Kosten – Kleinbetriebe und Ein-Mann-GmbH, 5th edition, Heyne, München (2001)
- As editor: Start West – Ratgeber für Unternehmer und Existenzgründer in der DDR – Kredite, Leasing Kooperationen, Joint-Venture, Franchising, Firmenrecht, Service & Adressen, Geoconsult GmbH, Neu-Isenburg (1990)
