= Roland Hüttenrauch =

Roland Johannes Hüttenrauch (26 January 1928 – 12 January 2006) was in charge of Stiftung Warentest, the German consumer organisation in Berlin from 1967 to 1994.

Roland Hüttenrauch was born in Oberlungwitz, Germany. After finishing school in 1946, he went on to study, first at the University of Leipzig and then at Technische Universität Berlin. There he graduated with a degree in Physics, followed by a doctorate in Engineering Physics in 1961. He was a lecturer in the university's Engineering Department till 1964 and worked as a freelancer for the German Association of Consumer Organisations.

He was appointed Head of the Technology Department of Stiftung Warentest shortly after it was established in 1964 and as such, he played a major role in its development to a successful and internationally recognised institution. In 1967 he succeeded Olaf Triebenstein as the managing director of Stiftung Warentest and was then appointed executive director in 1972. During this time, he developed the method of comparative product testing. Roland Hüttenrauch retired in 1994 and was succeeded by Werner Brinkmann. He remained a member of Stiftung Warentest's Supervisory Board till 1999.

In 1988 he was awarded the Order of Merit of the Federal Republic of Germany (First Class). In Germany he is generally considered to be "the father of the comparative testing of goods".

== Selected publications ==
- The methodology of comparative product testing, Journal of Consumer Policy, Springer Netherlands 1, 2 (March 1977), pp. 143 to 150
- Gebrauchstauglichkeit und Gebrauchswert, chapter 35 in: Handbuch Qualitätsmanagement, Hanser Fachbuchverlag (1999), 4th Edition
- Einige Einflüsse der Rechtsprechung auf die Arbeitsmethodik der Stiftung Warentest, in: Vergleichender Warentest: Testpraxis, Testwerbung, Rechtsprechung, Verlag Moderne Industrie, Landsberg/Lech (1986), pp. 25 to 34
