= Corporate venture capital =

Investment of corporate funds directly in external startup companies

Corporate venture capital (CVC) is the investment of corporate funds directly in external startup companies. CVC is defined by the Business Dictionary as the "practice where a large firm takes an equity stake in a small but innovative or specialist firm, to which it may also provide management and marketing expertise; the objective is to gain a specific competitive advantage." Examples of CVCs include GV, Intel Capital, and Salesforce Ventures.

== Definition ==
CVC refers to the investment of corporate funds directly in external startup companies. The definition of CVC can also be clarified by distinguishing it from other forms of investment. An investment made through an external fund managed by a third party, even when the investment vehicle is funded by a single investing company, is not considered CVC. CVC is not synonymous with venture capital (VC); rather, it is a specific subset of venture capital.

In essence, Corporate Venturing is about setting up structural collaborations with external ventures or parties to drive mutual growth. These external ventures are startups (early-stage companies) or scaleups (companies that have found product/market fit) that come from outside the organization. Due to its hybrid nature involving both elements of corporate rigidity and startup culture, managing a successful CVC unit is a difficult task that involves a number of hurdles and often fails to deliver the expected outcomes.

== Objectives ==
As Henry Chesbrough, professor at Haas School of Business at UC Berkeley, explains in his "Making Sense of Corporate Venture Capital" article, CVC has two hallmarks: (1) its objective; and (2) the degree to which the operations of the start up and investing company are connected. CVC differs from private VC in that, in addition to financial returns, it commonly seeks to advance strategic objectives. Strategically driven CVC investments are made primarily to increase, directly or indirectly, the sales and profits of the incumbent firm's business. A well-established firm making a strategic CVC investment seeks to identify and exploit synergies between itself and the new venture. The goal is to exploit the potential for additional growth within the parent firm. For instance, investing firms may want to obtain a window on new technologies, enter new markets, identify acquisition targets, or access new resources.

Financially-driven CVC investments are investments where parent firms are looking for leverage on returns. The full potential of leverage is often achieved through exits such as initial public offering (IPO) or sales of stakes to third parties. The objective is to exploit the independent revenue and profit in the new venture itself. Specifically for CVC, the parent company seeks to do as well as if not better than private VC investors, hence the motivation to keep its VC efforts "in house". The CVC division often believes it has a competitive advantage over private VC firms due to what it considers to be superior knowledge of markets and technologies, its strong balance sheet, and its ability to be a patient investor. Chesbrough points out that a company's brand may signal the quality of the start-up to other investors and potential customers; this may eventually result in rewards to the initial investor. He gives the example of Dell Ventures, Dell Computer's in-house VC division, which made multiple Internet investments with the expectation of earning favorable returns. Although Dell hoped the seed money will help its own business grow, the primary motivation for the investments was the opportunity to earn high financial returns.

Reaching strategic goals is not necessarily in opposition to financial objectives. As literature demonstrates, both objectives can go hand in hand and offer complementary motivations. In the long run, all strategic investments produce financial added value. This is not to say that, occasionally the short-term concordance between financial and strategic objectives might be questionable. For instance, a strong focus on achieving short-term financial goals might have a counterproductive impact on the ability to achieve long-term strategic objectives, which would in turn reduce long-term financial returns. In lieu of this dilemma, parent firms first screen venture proposals for strategic rationales. Then when an investment proposal fits strategic objectives, corporate firms analyze it according to financial investment standards, using methods analogous to independent venture capitalists.

A recent empirical study has examined the degree to which European incumbent firms emphasize on strategic and financial objectives. Results show that 54% of European parent firms invest primarily for strategic reasons, yet with financial concerns, 33% invest primarily for financial reasons with strategic concerns and 13% invest purely financial. None invest solely for strategic rationals. In comparison with an American study, results show significant differences in investment styles. In fact, 50% of US parent firms invest primarily strategic with financial concerns, 20% financial with strategic concerns, 15% purely financial and 15% purely strategic. As a rule, incumbent firms, whether European or American, invest primarily for strategic reasons.

The second hallmark of corporate VC investments is the extent to which companies in the investment portfolio are linked to the investing company's current operational abilities. For example, a start-up with strong links to the investing company might make use of that company's manufacturing plants, distribution channels, technology, or brand. It might adopt the investing company's business practices to build, sell, or service its products. An external venture may offer the investing company an opportunity to build new and different capabilities—ones that could threaten the viability of current corporate capabilities. Housing these capabilities in a separate legal entity can insulate them from internal efforts to undermine them. If the venture and its processes fare well, the corporation can then evaluate whether and how to adapt its own processes to be more like those of the start-up. Although it happens far less than commonly thought, the CVC parent company may attempt to acquire the new venture.

(1969~99) 20 Largest venturing firms (from Dushnitsky, 2006) 1. Intel 2. Cisco 3. Microsoft 4. Comdisco 5. Dell 6. MCIworld.com 7. AOL 8. Motorola 9. Sony 10. Qualcomm 11. Safeguard 12. Sun Micro 13. J&J 14. Global-Tech 15. Yahoo 16. Xerox 17. Compaq 18. Citigroup 19. Ford Motor 20. Comcast

== Investing and Financing ==
=== Types of Investing ===
By combining the two dimensions of CVC investing - strategic and financial objectives - four distinct investment motivations and strategies can be outlined.

A. Driving Investments This type of CVC investing pertains to the investment that involves a strategic driver. Driving investments are pursued by CVCs for strategic alignment that is tightly linked between the investment company's operations and the startup company that is being invested in. The purpose of this investing option is to advance the strategy of the current business. The CVC looks for key growth areas within the startup companies and then hopes to combine them with the company's initiatives. Appropriately selected investing and alignment can benefit the investing company by furthering the corporate strategy. On the other hand, this could result in failure. Closely linked investments essentially roll into the current strategy in place. This would not be useful in dealing with already disruptive strategies in place, or in finding new ones when the investing company needs to update processes when trying to keep up with a changing environment. Thus, if CVCs are looking to “transcend current strategies and processes,” they would need to look to other investing strategies.

B. Enabling Investments Enabling investments are also made for strategic purpose, but in this case, they are not linked closely with the investing company's operations. The thought process is that a tight link is not necessary for a successful investment to help the investing company to succeed. Although this may seem counterintuitive, the idea is to take advantage of complementary products. Enabling investments complement the strategy of the current business. Ideally, the popularity of the investments will help to create demand for the investing company's products by stimulating the industry in which the products are used. The limits of enabling investments are that they will only be successful if they “capture a substantial portion of the market growth they stimulate”.

C. Emergent Investments While Emergent investments do not promote current strategies, they do link tightly with the investing company's operations. If the business environment or company's strategy changes, the investment could become strategically valuable. This design helps create a sort of option strategy that is independent of financial returns. Emergent investments allow investing companies to explore new untapped markets that they are unable to enter due to their focus on the current markets they serve. Investment products can be sold in new markets to help gather vital information that could not be otherwise obtained. If the information looks promising, the company could look to shift towards this new direction. Emergent investments are initially made for financial gains but could ultimately result in strategic gains as well. On the contrary, if they do not prove to be important for the company strategy, they should be left untouched to generate whatever financial returns possible. In summary, emergent investments require “balancing financial discipline and strategic potential.”

D. Passive Investments Passive investments are connected to neither the investing company's strategy nor their operations. Thus, these investments do not help the investing company to actively advance their own business and can only provide financial returns. Essentially, passive investments are no different from typical investments whose financial returns are contingent on the volatility of the private equity market. Due to the lack of any strategic advantages with this kind of investing, passive investments are not very practical or advantageous.

=== Stages of financing ===
Corporate venture capital firms provide funding to startup companies during various phases of development. Each phase has its own financing requirements, and CVCs will often indicate the stage of financing needed and the types of investments they prefer to make. Later stages of financing usually mean less risky investments, and investment in these companies typically costs more because of higher company or product valuations.

Investments in startup companies are expected to provide CVCs with a return on investment within 4–7 years, whereas investments in established companies are expected to have a shorter 2- to 4-year period.

A. Early-stage financing In this stage, the startup company basically has a concept. Capital is used to carry out market research and product development. Startup financing can be used to establish management, research and development, marketing, and quality management teams and buy additional equipment and resources. An extension of early-stage financing is First-Stage Financing, where companies can start manufacturing and sales processes to initiate a product launch.

B. Seed capital funds This phase finances early stage companies. The startup is still shaping its concept and production and service are not yet developed fully. Investment money can be used at this time to construct a working prototype. Additionally, the funds can be used to further market research and legal issues such as patents. Investment firms only expect 20% of companies to succeed, moving to second round of financing. In this stage, the company can often be moved to another round of funding or even a series of funds that take over the management of the investment. Investing firms expect a high percentage of the business and often provide funding in stages that is dependent on the startup company reaching set milestones. For example, a venture capital may agree to $5 million during this phase, but may pay out the funding in 1/3 installments based on the startup meeting set milestones. Finally, CVCs often look to promote or insist on specific executives to manage the startup at this time.

C. Expansion financing Second-Stage: Companies already selling product are funded at this stage to help in their expansion. One to ten million dollars can be provided to help recruit more employees to establish engineering, sales, and marketing functions. Companies are often not making profits at this time and thus funds can also be used to cover negative cash flow.

Third-Stage or Mezzanine Financing allows for greater company expansion. This can include further development of management, plants, marketing, and possibly even additional products. Companies at this stage are often doing very well, breaking even or even turning a profit.

D. Initial public offering (IPO) When a company goes public, it is called an initial public offering. This is often the ideal scenario CVCs hope to achieve with an investment. The startup company's stock can now be bought and sold by the public. This is when an investing company can finally earn a significant return on its investment. For example, suppose a CVC were to invest or buy 50% of a startup for $5 million. If the startup then goes public for $100 million, the CVCs investment would grow to $50 million, or tenfold its initial investment. This is often the last phase where CVCs are involved. They look to sell their stock to cash in on the returns from their investment. Next, they look to reinvest in new ventures, starting from the beginning to invest in a new startup.

E. Mergers and acquisitions Due to the current economic climate, IPOs have become a rarer occurrence recently, causing venture capital firms to look towards mergers and acquisitions. Acquisitions are the most common way venture-backed companies exit: of the 1,147 U.S. venture exits recorded in 2024, 1,083 were acquisitions, compared with 42 initial public offerings. This is a more realistic scenario, especially when startup companies do not look to function independently. Acquisition financing uses investment funds to acquire or buy another company. This may be completed by venture capital firms to align their startup with a complementary product or business line where the combined companies look to assimilate smoothly, creating advantages. Acquisitions could also work in the opposite direction where an invested startup is acquired by another firm. In this case, the CVC would be cashing in by selling its investment. Using the capital gains, it can look to reinvest with a new venture. Mergers are similar to acquisitions; however, in this case, one company is not buying another. Rather the two companies are combining to share resources, processes, and technology, which it hopes to leverage for several advantages such as cost savings, liquidity, market positioning and sharing burdens such as fund raising.

Each individual CVC uses specific procedures and financing stages that serve its interests best. The financing stages presented above are only a basic format. CVCs can have more financing stages or even less. Thus, it is important that startup companies understand that the financing strategies employed by CVC that they are working with fit their needs.

=== Financing process ===
The financing process outlines basic steps taken by CVCs from initial contact with potential startup companies through the first round of financing.

1. Startup companies looking for financing make initial contact with CVCs. CVCs can also seek out potential startups looking for funding.
2. Startup management team presents a business plan to the CVC. If the reviewed business plan generates interest, the CVC will ask the startup for more information including a product demonstration. Investors will also conduct their own due diligence to investigate and better understand the product, technology, market, and any other related issues.
3. If the CVCs are interested in the proposed startups product or service, they will look to determine the value of the startup. They communicate this valuation to the startup, often via a term sheet. If the startup is happy with the offer, a purchase price and investor equity is agreed on. Negotiations can take place during this stage of investment valuation.
4. Legal counsels from both sides agree to a finalized term sheet where business terms for the investment are specified. A closed period, referred to as a lock-up time period, is also established during which the start up company cannot discuss investing opportunities with other investment groups. This indicates that a pending deal is in the process of completion. Once a term sheet is finalized, both sides look to negotiate and finalize financing terms.
5. Negotiations are conducted between the legal counsels from the CVC and the startup company. The startup legal team typically creates transaction documents that the CVC counsel reviews. Negotiations continue until all legal and business issues are addressed. During this time, the CVC conducts a more thorough investigation of the startup company, understanding the startup's books and records, financial statements, projected performance, employees and suppliers, and even its customer base.
6. Closing of financing is the final step. This can take place immediately upon execution of the definitive agreements or after a few weeks. The additional time may be necessary if the CVC needs time to complete their due-diligence or based on the startup company's financial needs.

== In the healthcare industry ==
=== Introduction ===
This section discusses venture capital activities of healthcare providers such as Ascension Health, biotech firms such as Biogen Idec, and pharmaceutical companies such as GlaxoSmithKline, all of which are healthcare-related companies and have internal venture capital units or wholly owned subsidiaries focused on venture capital. The structure of corporate venture capital within the healthcare arena; the most common types of investments made; and the main reasons for which healthcare companies invest will be addressed, as well as the current trends and some predictions for the industry.

=== Structure ===
By definition, the corporate venture capital field is made up of organizations whose primary activities are not investing in other firms (see above). Since that definition rules out freestanding healthcare venture capital firms such as De Novo Ventures, as well as publicly traded firms, what remains are a limited number of organizational structure types used by healthcare corporate venture capital. The two main types are: 1) divisions within a larger healthcare company; and 2) wholly owned subsidiaries of larger healthcare companies. CVC units of both of these types often engage in partnerships with other firms. In most cases the other firms are limited partners and the primary company manages the fund and is the only general partner.

=== Types of investments ===
The largest segment of healthcare-related venture capital investments are made by the venture arms of firms who focus on biotechnology and pharmaceutical products, such as Eli Lilly and Company, GlaxoSmithKline, Takeda Pharmaceutical Company (TCP), Biogen Idec, and Roche. Because the top priority of many of these venture capital units or divisions is to fund ventures that may result in scientific and technological discoveries and advancements that may benefit their parent companies, most tend to invest in companies whose products or proposed products are similar to their own.

=== Reasons for Investing ===
There are a number of reasons for which a healthcare-related company chooses to pursue corporate venture capital, both strategic and financial. While most healthcare corporate venture capital companies or divisions seek to at least be budget neutral to their parent companies, strategic reasons are generally stronger motivators than financial ones.

One primary strategic reason many healthcare-related CVCs cite for investing is to seek new directions and develop new products. For this reason the focus of most CVC units is broader than their parent company, as stated previously. CVC fund managers usually will examine a broad array of investment opportunities that are related to some degree to the activities of their parent company in the hopes that the technologies developed will complement the product line of the parent company or even lead the parent company into an area of the industry in which it previously had not been occupied.

Another strategic motivation for engaging in corporate venture capital activities is to supplement and support the activities of the parent company. While all of the companies which were researched (with the exception of De Novo Ventures) also had research and development divisions and were actively pursuing improvements to their products, the leadership of these firms recognize that developments reached by other companies could certainly be helpful to them. This occurs most often when the firm in which the CVC division invests is focused on products or services that are fairly similar to those produced or offered by the parent company. This rationale applies not just to improvements on the products a company makes, but also the process by which it makes them. In fact, interviews with top executives at one firm reveal that the improvement of manufacturing processed is very much a consideration in their investments.

=== Current trends and predictions ===
The repercussions of the 2009 economic downturn have been felt throughout the field of corporate venture capital and healthcare has not been completely immune. For example, because of the scarcity of available funds within the biotech segment of the industry the valuation of private biotech firms is at an all-time low. However, the healthcare industry is seen as somewhat recession-resistant and this has encouraged some investors within the field. As such, while most major corporations with venture capital arms are keeping cash close to home, some of the first positive movement within corporate venture capital as a whole is coming from healthcare. The new venture fund recently opened by Merck Serono and the fund just closed by Ascension Health Ventures are just a few examples of the optimism that is slowly reentering venture capital within healthcare. The latest survey on the top 75 most influential healthcare corporate venture capital divisions shows they are increasingly influential and larger than many independent VCs.

Another trend that may see more action as venture capital funds continue to be scarce is an increasing number of strategic partnerships between firms that are based not on exchange of funds, but rather on exchange of technologies or process information. These types of partnerships, also known as corporate in-kind investments, may become increasingly common as liquid funds become less available but technologies that have been developed are readily shareable. One specific example of this sort of information exchange is a partnership between a large, well-established company and a small, developing company who have complementary technologies or processes. Such 'David and Goliath' partnerships are already starting to emerge outside of the healthcare industry and will likely emerge within healthcare soon.

=== Sectors ===
Investments from venture capital firms and CVC in 1998 were mostly in software and telecommunications sectors. By 2006 the biotechnology and medical devices became the sectors with the most investments from both, venture capital firms and CVC. However, there has not been significant investments in health services and have actually decreased through these periods. Biotechnology CVC's investments in biotechnology are higher than those from VC firms. However, medical devices and health services had a is not a top sector for CVC investments as it is for VC firms. Other top sectors for CVC investments are software, telecommunications, semiconductors, and media/entertainment.

Top sectors for CVC investment:

- Biotechnology,
- Software,
- Telecommunications,
- Semiconductors, and
- Media/entertainment.

Top sectors for VC investment:

- Software,
- Biotechnology,
- Medical devices, and
- Telecommunications.

=== In the life sciences ===
Many of today's well known companies in life sciences have been backed with billions of dollars by venture capital investments. Some of these are: Boston Scientific, Amgen, Genentech, Genzyme, Gilead Sciences, Kyphon, Intuitive Surgical, and Scimed Life Systems. From the $25.5 billion in total venture capital investments, there were $7.2 billion targeted to the life sciences industry. The life sciences include sectors in biotechnology and medical devices and equipment. Venture capital investments within biotechnology accounted for $4.5 billion and within medical devices and equipment for $2.7 billion.

Venture capital investments have gone toward specific disease. For example, there was venture capital support during the past 20 years of $14.9 billion in cardiovascular/heart diseases, $14.7 billion in cancer, and $4.9 billion in diabetes.

=== Examples ===
Eli Lilly Corporate Business Development

Eli Lilly Corporate Business Development (CBD), CVC division from Eli Lilly and Company:

Johnson & Johnson Development Corporation

JJDC is the venture capital subsidiary of Johnson & Johnson.

Dow Venture Capital

Dow Venture Capital (DVC), CVC division from Dow Chemical, invests in start-up companies in North America, Europe and Asia. DVC is located in company headquarters in Midland, MI; in European headquarters in Zurich; and in Gotemba, Japan.

Siemens Venture Capital

Siemens Venture Capital (SVC) is the corporate venture organization for Siemens AG. Its focus is on growth segments in the energy, industry and healthcare sectors. To date, SVC has invested over 800 million euros in more than 150 startup companies and 40 venture capital funds. SVC is located in Germany (Munich), in the U.S. (Palo Alto, CA and Boston, MA), in China (Beijing), in India (Mumbai), and is active through Siemens´ regional unit in Israel.

Kaiser Permanente Ventures

Kaiser Permanente Ventures (KPV) the corporate venture capital arm of Kaiser Permanente. KPV invests in medical devices, health care services and health care information technology companies.

Geisinger Ventures Geisinger Ventures is the corporate venture arm of Geisinger Health System. GV invests resources in healthcare technology, information technology, medical devices, medical diagnostics and therapeutics. GV utilizes funds from its balance sheet.

Ascension Health Ventures

Ascension Health Ventures was established in 2001 by Ascension Health with a commitment of $125 million to invest in expansion- to late-stage healthcare companies.

The University of Texas Horizon Fund

The UT Horizon Fund (UTHF) is the strategic corporate venture arm of The University of Texas.

The UTHF's goals are to: (1) Improve commercialization of UT technologies, and (2) Improve sustainability through a positive return on investment. The Fund is evergreen where a significant portion of gains are re-invested back into the Horizon Fund for future growth. Phase I of the Fund has been capitalized at $10M through the Available University Fund of the University of Texas.

The two primary programs of the fund are:

- Existing Ventures Program. Many university startups have difficulty raising desired levels of funding to continue development of technologies through to the final stages of commercialization. University equity positions may become diluted with preferred rights to new investors. The UT Horizon Fund co-invests with new investors to continue university equity participation all the way through to commercialization. By doing so, UT System can increase its return on investment both in terms of delivering real products and services beneficial to society as well as to providing financial return.
- New Ventures Program. The biggest bottleneck at the earliest stages of commercialization is access to entrepreneurial talent. Seasoned entrepreneurs are necessary to help facilitate effective business planning critical for growth and development and to seek regulatory approval and other activities.

About UT System:

- Established by the Texas Constitution in 1876, The University of Texas System consists of nine academic universities and six health institutions, including UT Austin, UT MD Anderson Cancer Center and UT Southwestern Medical Center, along with 12 other institutions. The mission of The University of Texas System is to provide high-quality educational opportunities for the enhancement of the human resources of Texas, the nation, and the world through intellectual and personal growth. System administration is based in Austin, Texas. Offices are also located in Midland, Texas (University Lands/West Texas Operations) and Washington, D.C. (Federal Relations). These offices are responsible for the central management and coordination of the academic and health institutions.
- The UT System has a special responsibility for managing the Permanent University Fund (PUF), the Available University Fund (AUF), other endowments, managing university lands, carrying out the Board of Regents' policies, collaborating with the Board of Regents on strategic planning, and serving as consultants to the institutions on issues ranging from academic programs to fund raising. In addition, the System provides a wide range of centralized, cost-effective, and value-added services on behalf of the UT institutions and the public.

=== Investment criteria by provider (Ascension Health example) ===
Opportunities are evaluated for potential clinical, operational and financial benefits to our limited partner health systems in addition to the financial return to the venture fund.

Diversification is also a consideration; AHV seeks to balance the portfolio across sectors and stages to mitigate investment risk.

Every opportunity is evaluated against the following criteria:

- Industry - Healthcare segments including medical devices, medical and information technology and services. AHV has also selectively invested in other healthcare venture funds.
- Investment Size - Approximately $5 million per round; up to $10 million per company.
- Company Stage - Expansion- to late-stage within three to five years of a potential liquidating event.
- Adoption Potential - Sustainable competitive advantage with compelling benefit sufficient to influence market adoption.
- Management Team - Established team with demonstrated relevant experience, depth and capability to build the business to scale and attract customers.
- Other - AHV typically requests a Board observer seat for each portfolio company.

== In information and communication technology companies ==
A decade after the NASDAQ stock exchange peaked at 5,132 on March 10, 2000, the index was 2,358 - less half its high point. This fall affected technology investing as the NASDAQ was an important market to sell venture capital-backed companies, often with business models based on using the internet. Technology companies with corporate venturing divisions were even more cyclical investors at the top of the market than independent venture capital firms and then many of the last funds to be raised before the peak were subsequently closed, such as EDS/AT Kearney (in 2002–2003, according to AT Kearney), or sold, such as Comdisco.

However, non-technology firms have continued to invest their corporate venture capital in information and communication technology businesses and in recent years a number of non-US-based technology companies have expanded or started their corporate venturing units, according to the July 2010 issue of Global Corporate Venturing. The non-technology firms interested in buying stakes includes global advertising agency WPP, oil major Chevron and Dow Chemical, while non-US companies include Korean conglomerate Samsung and Chinese computer maker Legend Holdings. However, a number of US-based technology companies with corporate venture capital units in the 1990s, such as IBM and Microsoft, have concentrated more on other forms of finding external innovation, such as partnering or competitions.

== In the utilities sector, including telecom operators ==
Utilities have traditionally been businesses where the customer is the regulator rather than the rate-payer using the service. This has traditionally meant innovation, including through the use of corporate venturing, has been of lower priority than gaining market share and pricing power unless required by regulatory action. Corporate venturing at utilities, therefore, has historically been more pro-cyclical to the economic than other industry sectors. However, telecom operators in particular, such as Deutsche Telekom's T-Venture and formerly France Telecom's Innovacom, have built up a successful track record through at least one economic cycle and an increasing number of utilities across the electric, gas and phone industries have started to increase their use of external innovation and corporate venturing. Korea Telecom in July 2010 set up a KRW1 trillion (US$830m) corporate venturing fund, the largest announced fund since the technology, media and telecoms bubble burst in 2000 and 2001.

== In the media sector ==
Media companies have found their business model being transformed by the internet and digitalisation of information. The invention of the printing press in Germany about 1440 is widely regarded as the most important event of the second Christian millennium, which reflects the role wider and faster dissemination of information has in society. The evolution to web-based storage and transfer of media content and control being passed from media owners to people more broadly is affecting business models and established communication companies are using corporate venturing as a tool to help understand the changes.

This role can be powerful both for the venturing parent and economies where they operate. The two most influential corporate venturing units in the media sector, South Africa-based Naspers and US-based Interactive Data Group, have chosen to primarily operate in emerging markets away from established mainstream media groups. Their success has allowed Naspers to survive and become the largest media group in emerging markets operating in more than 127 countries and IDG to create one of China's largest venture capital groups and a model to expand across Asia, including India. The success and fears for the future of other groups has encouraged a host of expansion and new media units to be set up, including Kaplan.

== In the energy and clean-tech sector ==
Clean technology, the application of digital or wireless products to the energy or other industries to reduce power consumption or improve efficiency, has been described as the "first global technological revolution", according to consultants at Cleantech Group. Since 2005, Cleantech Group has tracked a +50% increase in corporate venturing in clean-tech and energy from 79 to about 199 in 2009. Global Corporate Venturing selected US oil major Chevron as the most influential corporate venturing unit among the energy and natural resource companies.

Other large companies with Corporate Venture Capital or Corporate Strategic Partnership arms include:

Dow Venture Capital Invests in several cleantech sectors including: materials science, alternative energy technologies, and water technologies.

Saint Gobain External Venturing The largest construction products manufacturer in the world, this is the Saint-Gobain unit dedicated to developing strategic partnerships between the Group and start-up companies all over the world in the green building, energy, and advanced materials spaces.

MAHLE Corporate Venture Capital

MAHLE Corporate Venture Capital (MVC) is the corporate venture arm of MAHLE GmbH. MVC invests in funds as well as start-up companies related to the cleantech- and automotive sector, respectively drive-train and mechatronics solutions. MVC is located in Germany.

Energy Technology Ventures A joint venture involving General Electric, NRG Energy, and ConocoPhillips focused on the development of next-generation energy technologies. The JV will invest in, and offer commercial collaboration opportunities to venture- and growth-stage energy technology companies in the renewable power generation, smart grid, energy efficiency, oil, natural gas, coal and nuclear energy, emission controls, water and biofuels sectors, primarily in North America, Europe and Israel.

== In the financial sector ==
Financial services companies have long been interested corporate venturers. Banks and insurers have been active limited partners in independent venture capital funds, albeit with below-average returns. According to this academic paper, "banks have long been important private equity investors. The motivations for their investment activity, however, are frequently more complex than those of other LPs".

Banks have sometimes invested in venture capital to gain early access to companies before their flotation (initial public offering, IPO). With the decrease in number of IPOs after the dot.com boom, poor financial returns from investing in venture capital over the past decade, regulatory restrictions and relative better performance in using debt-backed securities, there are fewer banks and other financial services investors active in the sector, according to research by Global Corporate Venturing.

The remaining financial services investors are more likely to be boutique merchant banks, such as Burrill & Co., than mainstream universal banks or bancassurers. However, a nascent class of large firms, such as insurer The Hartford and bank Citigroup, has started to emerge using corporate venturing, i.e. investing in VC funds or directly in third parties for a minority equity position, as a tool to help their business with product development or understand new technologies/services. This model is similar to the approach taken in other economic sectors and led to Citigroup being ranked the most influential corporate venturing unit in financial services in November 2010.

== In the transport and logistics sector ==
Companies in the transport and logistics sector have been occasional sponsors of corporate venturing units, with an increase in technology starting to see further resurgence. Volvo group has been an active investor in this sector since 1997 through its VC company Volvo Technology Transfer. US-listed General Motors set up a $100m fund in June 2010 while post and logistics group Deutsche Post DHL set up DHL Innovation Center into its DHL Solutions & Innovations unit in late 2009. However, other established groups cut back on their corporate venturing activities during the 2008 financial crisis, with Netherlands-based TNT winding up the Logispring II fund where it was a majority investor in late 2009. JetBlue Technology Ventures has been an example of a corporate venture capital unit that has been active in investing in the airline and transportation business.

== Professional organizations ==
Global Corporate Venturing Global Corporate Venturing is a media group providing news, data and comment for the industry and the wider entrepreneurial and venture community. The flagship title is Global Corporate Venturing, a monthly PDF magazine, along with daily news updates online and a LinkedIn community message and discussion group.

Strategic Venture Association The Strategic Venture Association is an organization dedicated to the needs of the corporate investing and strategic partnering community. The Association's goal is to bring together professionals to educate, inform and collaborate with each other around topics core to the group's interests. Given the current market conditions, the importance of working with external organizations to seek innovation, partnerships and investment opportunities has never been greater.

National Venture Capital Association Mission: the National Venture Capital Association (NVCA), comprising more than 450 member firms, is the premier trade association that represents the U.S. venture capital industry. NVCA's mission is to foster greater understanding of the importance of venture capital to the U.S. economy, and support entrepreneurial activity and innovation. The NVCA represents the public policy interests of the venture capital community, strives to maintain high professional standards, provides reliable industry data, sponsors professional development, and facilitates interaction among its members.

ICEX Corporate Venturing Knowledge Exchange Community This is a membership group made up solely of CV executives at large global companies. It is a private, confidential exchange where members share advice and experience on common challenges to improve their strategic investment and business model innovation activities in the large corporate setting. Limited to 12 companies, the community meets in-person and virtually to discuss current issues and share lessons learned. ICEX facilitates executive exchange for business and technology leaders at large global companies in areas of innovation, transformation, infrastructure, and enterprise architecture.
