= Susan A. Miller =

American historian

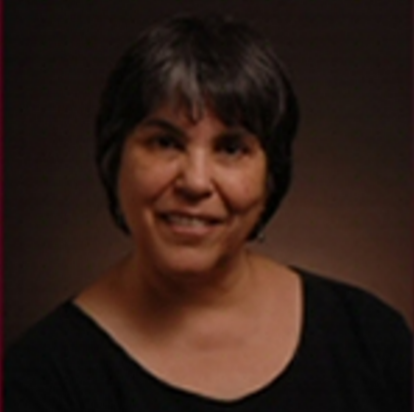

Academic work
- Institutions: Arizona State University

Susan A. Miller is an American Indian historian and past faculty member at Arizona State University within the American Indian Studies Program.

== Personal life ==
She currently lives in Lincoln, Nebraska. She is member of the Tiger Clan and Tom Palmer Band of the Seminole Nation and attended the University of Nebraska–Lincoln. She has made important contributions to academia in respect to Native American history. As a historian, she has written pieces that look to educate the masses in America about the myths and lies that have been taught about Native Americans since colonization. She has helped to retell history as well as study how other academics have contributed to countering the falsities about Native American History.

== Publications ==
=== Books ===
- Coacoochee's Bones: A Seminole Saga. University Press of Kansas. 2003.
  - A study of the Seminole leader, Coachoochee, and his people. Miller focuses on Coachoochee's leadership in the resistance against the United States government as the Seminoles were forced off of their Florida home to current day Oklahoma. Additionally, the book touches on controversial topics such as Black Seminoles as well as the return of the Seminoles to their original lands that the Kickapoo now inhabit.

=== Articles ===
- "Licensed Trafficking and Ethnogenetic Engineering". American Indian Quarterly. 20 (1): 49–55. Winter 1996.
  - Reprinted in Mihesuah, Devon A., ed. (1998). Natives and Academics. University of Nebraska Press. pp. 100–110.
- "Seminoles and Africans under Seminole Law: Sources and Discourses of Tribal Sovereignty and 'Black Indian' Entitlement". Wíčazo Ša Review. 20 (1): 23–47. 2005. doi:10.1353/wic.2005.0011. S2CID 159778592. Project MUSE 180306.
- "Native America Writes Back: The Origin of the Indigenous Paradigm in Historiography". Wíčazo Ša Review. 23 (2): 9–28. 2008. doi:10.1353/wic.0.0013. JSTOR 30131259. S2CID 162294656. Gale A186128832 Project MUSE 251747.

=== Chapters ===
- Native Historians Write Back: Decolonizing American History. Texas Tech University Press. 2011.
  - "Native America Writes Back: The Origin of Indigenous Paradigm in Historiography"
  - "The Indigenous Paradigm in American Indian Historiography"
  - "Seminoles and Africans under Seminole Law: Sources and Discourses of Tribal Sovereignty and “Black Indian” Entitlement":
