= Venture client =

Business model where companies buy startup products for advantage

A Venture Client is a company that purchases, uses and adopts startup solutions with the purpose of obtaining a strategic benefit. Venture clienting enables companies to tap into new technologies, business models and ideas and foster a culture of agility and growth.

The difference between a “normal” client and a venture client is that the startup solution presents a high risk of failing. The venture client company accepts the additional risk because the startup product solves a strategically relevant problem better than alternative solutions. The problem is strategic when it impacts the competitiveness of the venture client company. The differentiating factor between traditional Corporate Venture Capital (CVC) and Venture Clienting (VCL) is that, in essence, the latter focuses on the purchase of a startup product to obtain the strategic benefit without an equity stake. The term venture client was coined originally and popularized by Gregor Gimmy.

Companies that can benefit strategically from startup partnering chose to establish a dedicated corporate Venture Client Unit. The purpose of such an organisational unit is to enable the entire company to gain competitive advantage from startups on a continuous basis. Such venture client units operate on a dedicated venture client model, referring to venture client specific processes and resources, and are categorised as a corporate venturing vehicle.

Notable Venture Client companies with a dedicated Venture Client Unit are BMW Group (BMW Startup Garage), BSH Hausgeräte (BSH Startup Kitchen), Holcim (Holcim MAQER), Bosch Group (Open Bosch) and LG Electronics (LG Future Home).
