= Business incubator =

Organization that helps startups grow

A business incubator is an organization that helps startup companies and individual entrepreneurs develop their businesses by providing a wide range of services, starting with management training and office space, and ending with venture capital financing. The National Business Incubation Association (NBIA) defines business incubators as a tool for either regional or national economic development. It categorizes its members' incubators by the following five incubator types: academic institutions; non-profit development corporations; for-profit property development ventures; venture capital firms, and a combination of the above.

Business incubators differ from research and technology parks in their dedication to startup and early-stage companies. Research and technology parks, on the other hand, tend to be large-scale projects that house everything from corporate, government, or university labs to very small companies. Most research and technology parks do not offer business assistance services, which are the hallmark of a business incubation program. However, many research and technology parks house incubation programs.

== History ==
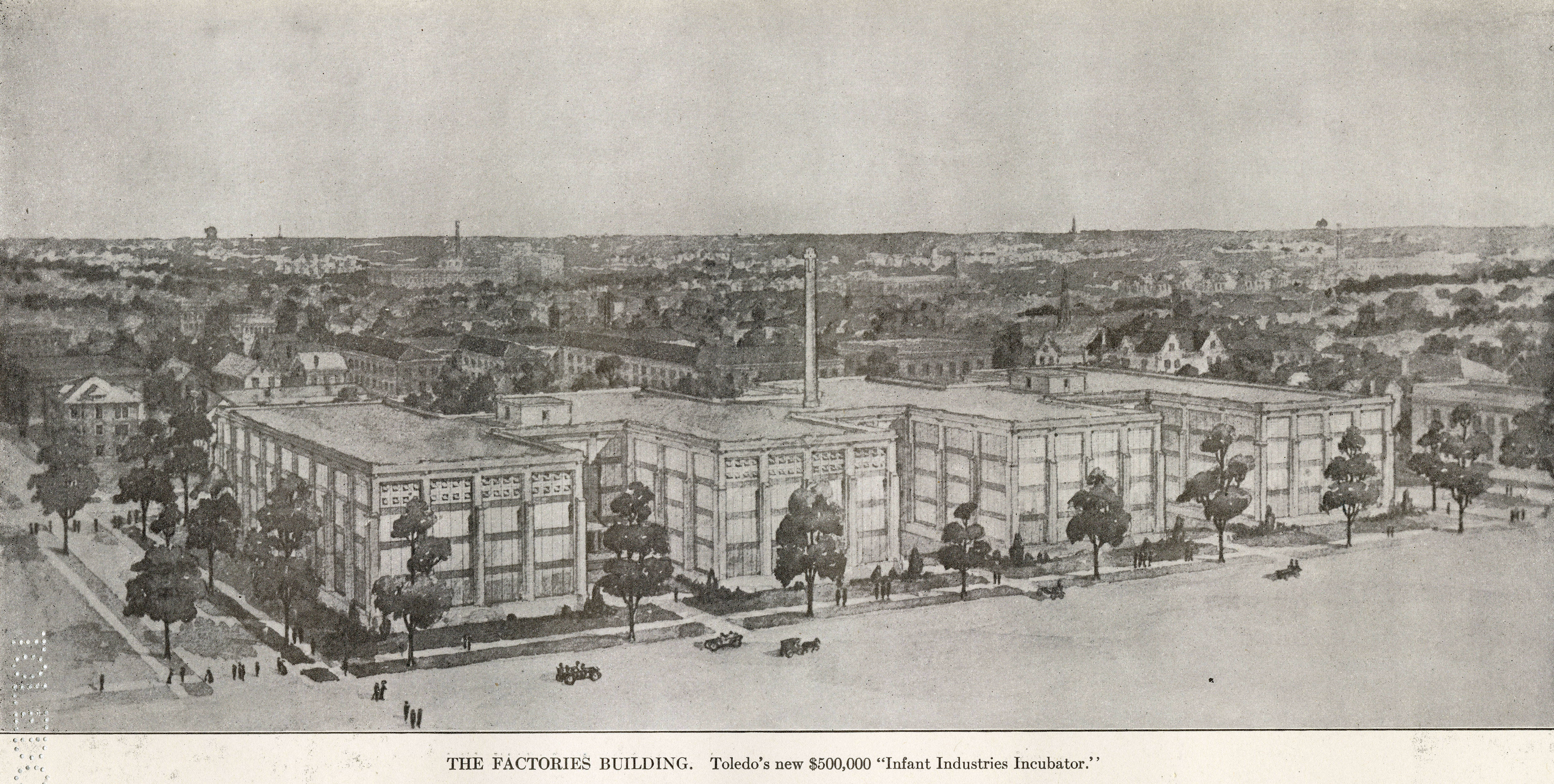
"THE FACTORIES BUILDING. Toledo's new $500,000 "Infant Industries Incubator." from "Bramble's views Toledo, Ohio : diamond anniversary 1837-1912"

The first business incubator was the Batavia Industrial Center, which opened in 1959 in Batavia, New York. Two years earlier, Massey-Harris had announced the closure of its Batavia farm machinery factory, resulting in a giant vacant building and a local unemployment rate of 18 percent. The Mancuso family, the dominant business family in that area of Western New York, was desperate to resuscitate the regional economy, whose imminent collapse threatened to bring down their various business enterprises. They bought the former harvester factory and placed Joseph Mancuso in charge of finding commercial tenants. It soon became clear that large corporations preferred to build new factories from scratch rather than shoehorn them into someone else's 80-year-old building, thereby forcing Mancuso to subdivide the vast space and lease smaller spaces to smaller tenants.

In Mancuso's frantic search for tenants, he offered creative incentives to anyone willing to sign a lease, such as "short-term leases, shared office supplies and equipment, business advice, and secretarial services", as well as assistance with linking up with local banks to secure financing. One tenant was a nearby chicken hatchery in need of space to house additional chicken coops, which explains the origin of the term "business incubator". In 1963, while giving a tour to a reporter of the various tenants in the Batavia Industrial Center, Mancuso pointed out the coops and remarked, "These guys are incubating chickens...I guess we’re incubating businesses".

Business incubation expanded across the U.S. in the 1980s and spread to the UK and Europe through various related forms (e.g. innovation centres, pépinières d'entreprises, technopoles/science parks).

The U.S.-based International Business Innovation Association estimates that there are about 7,000 incubators worldwide. A study funded by the European Commission in 2002 identified around 900 incubation environments in Western Europe. As of October 2006, there were more than 1,400 incubators in North America, up from only 12 in 1980. Her Majesty's Treasury identified around 25 incubation environments in the UK in 1997; by 2005, UKBI identified around 270 incubation environments across the country. In 2005 alone, North American incubation programs assisted more than 27,000 companies that provided employment for more than 100,000 workers and generated annual revenues of $17 billion.

Incubation activity has not been limited to developed countries; incubation environments are now being implemented in developing countries and raising interest for financial support from organizations such as UNIDO and the World Bank.

Within European Union countries, there are different EU and state funded programs that offer support in form of consulting, mentoring, prototype creation, and other services and co-funding for them.

In India, the business incubators are promoted in a varied fashion: as technology business incubators (TBI) and as startup incubators—the first deals with technology business (mostly, consultancy and promoting technology related businesses) and the latter deals with promoting startups (with more emphasis on establishing new companies, scaling the businesses, prototyping, patenting, and so forth).

The first high-tech incubator located in Silicon Valley was Catalyst Technologies started by Nolan Bushnell after he left Atari. "My idea was that I would fund [the businesses] with a key," says Bushnell. "And the key would fit a lock in a building. In the building would be a desk and chair, and down the hall would be a Xerox machine. They would sign their name 35 times and the company would be incorporated." All the details would be handled: "They'd have a health care plan, their payroll system would be in place, and the books would be set up. So in 15 minutes, they would be in business working on the project."

== Types of services ==
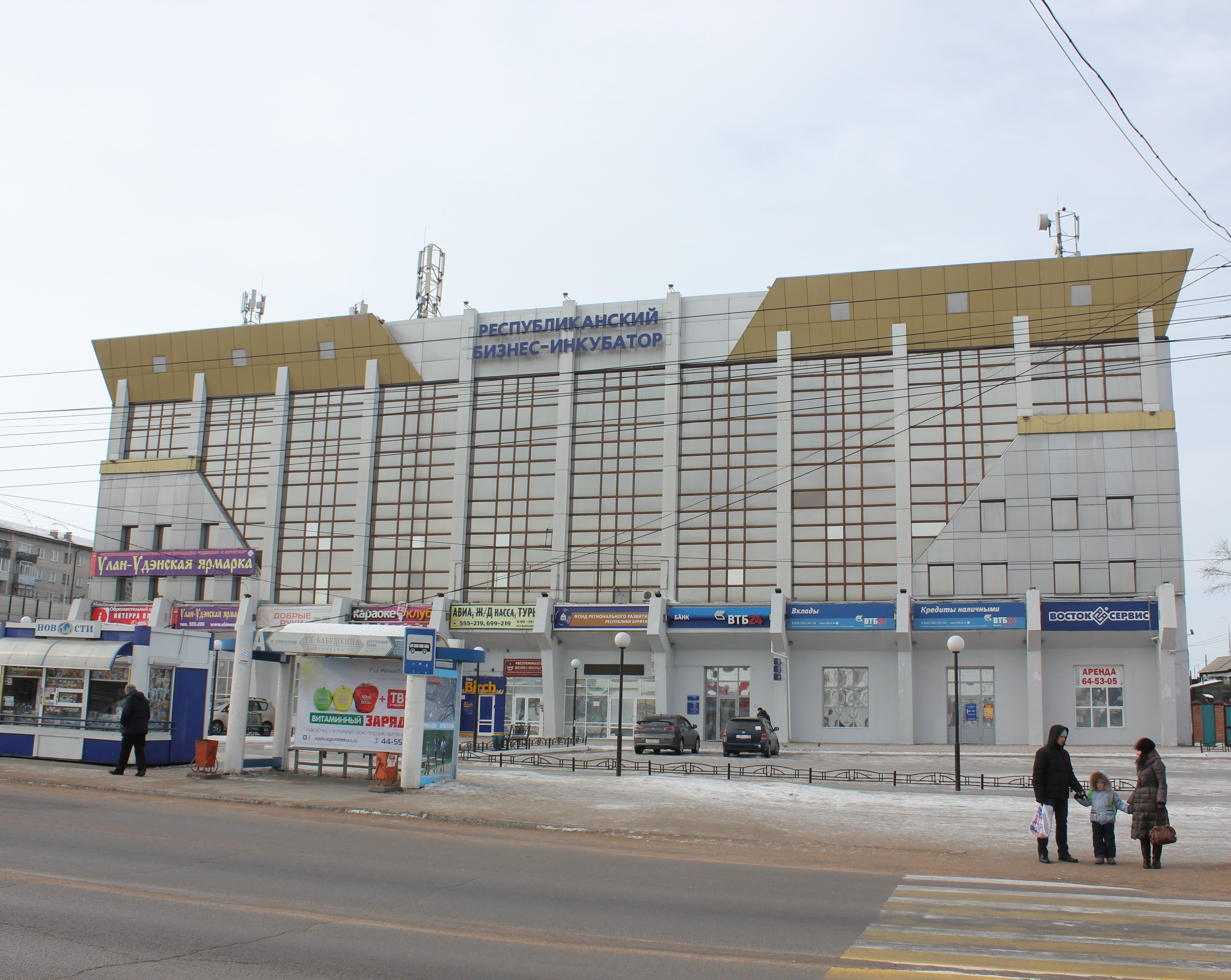
The building of the Business Incubator in Ulan-Ude, Buryatia

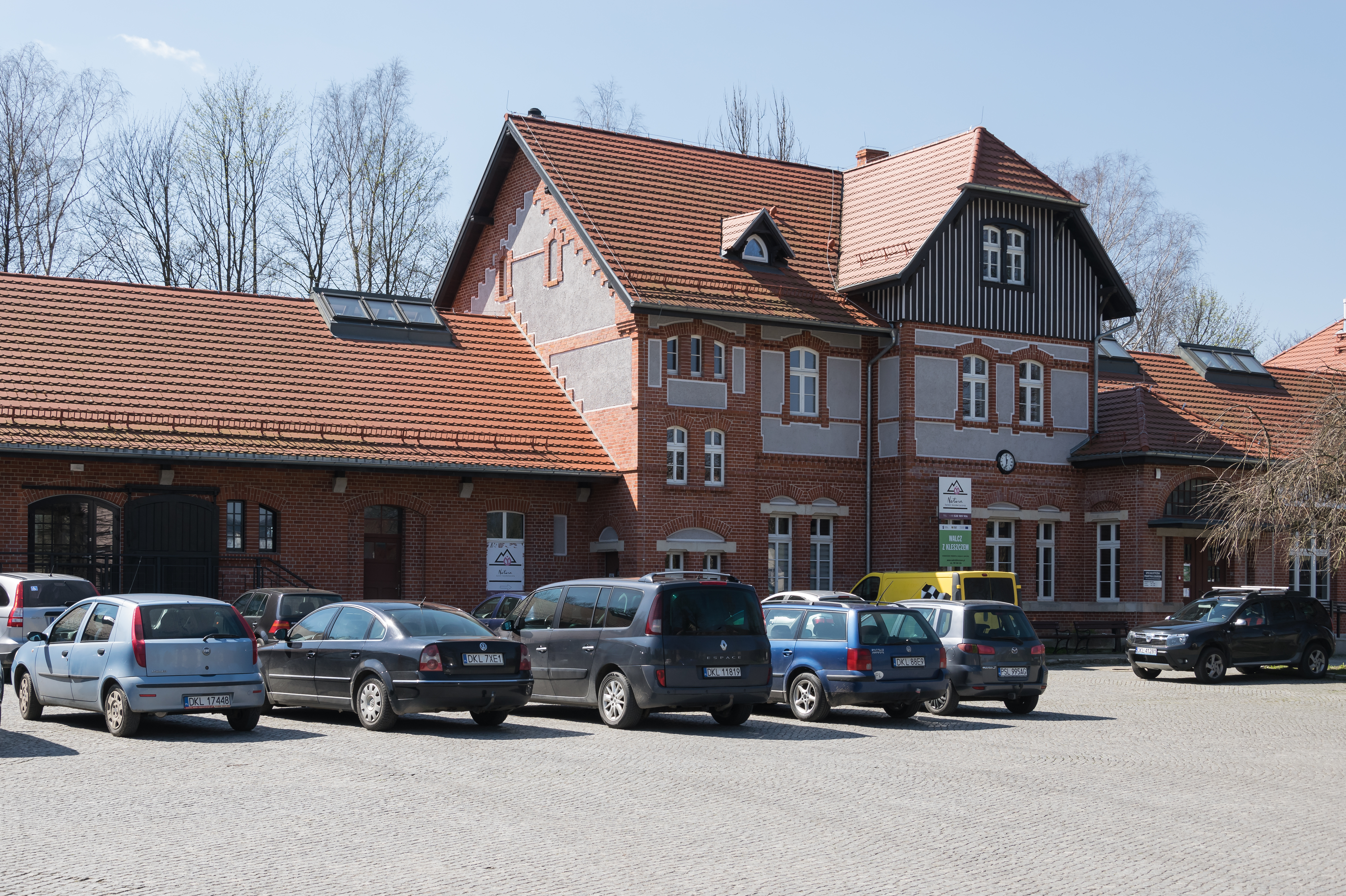

Since startup companies lack many resources, experience and networks, incubators provide services which helps them get through initial hurdles in starting up a business. These hurdles include space, funding, legal, accounting, computer services and other prerequisites to running the business.

According to the Small Business Administration's website, their mission provides small businesses with four main services. These services are:

- Plan your Business: Turn your great idea into a great business plan
- Launch your Business: Turn your business plan into a reality (register, file, and start doing business)
- Manage your Business: Master day-to-day operations and prepare for success
- Grow your Business: Find new funding, locations, and customers when business is good and it's time to expand

Among the most common incubator services are:

- Help with business basics
- Networking activities
- Marketing assistance
- Market Research
- High-speed Internet access
- Help with accounting/financial management
- Access to bank loans, loan funds and guarantee programs
- Help with presentation skills
- Links to higher education resources
- Links to strategic partners
- Access to angel investors or venture capital
- Comprehensive business training programs
- Advisory boards and mentors
- Management team identification
- Help with business etiquette
- Technology commercialization assistance
- Help with regulatory compliance
- Intellectual property management

== Types ==
Incubators differ from the U.S. Small Business Administration's Small Business Development Centers (and similar business support programs) in that they serve only selected clients. Congress created the Small Business Administration in the Small Business Act of July 30, 1953. Its purpose is to "aid, counsel, assist and protect, insofar as is possible, the interests of small business concerns." In addition, the charter ensures that small businesses receive a "fair proportion" of any government contracts and sales of surplus property. SBDCs work with any small businesses at any stage of development, and not only with startup companies. Many business incubation programs partner with their local SBDC to create a "one-stop shop" for entrepreneurial support.

There are a number of business incubators that have focused on particular industries or on a particular business model, earning them their own name.

- Virtual business incubator – online business incubator
  - Since the 1950s, an older incubator model required startups to set up at the incubator's site. After the dot-com bubble, the virtual model was born, allowing companies to receive advice on incubators without physically being at the shop. This new virtual business incubator model has been a major step forward for entrepreneurs, and are especially ideal for those who need the advice that an incubator office provides but who want to maintain their own offices, warehouses, etc.
- Kitchen incubator – a business incubator focused on the food industry
  - Specialty foods are typically high value and low production. Starting a commercial kitchen from scratch is a huge investment. The average food entrepreneur has to invest a lot of money before even making their food product, therefore not making profit for quite some time. Kitchen incubators give culinary entrepreneurs the opportunity to use low-cost kitchen space where they can rent a commercial kitchen space for an hourly or monthly rate. They also help culinary entrepreneurs make a profit by aiding in packaging, marketing, and selling their food products.
- Public incubator – a business incubator focused on the public good
  - Social incubators' goal, similar to all other business incubators, is to provide social entrepreneurs with the tools they need to expand their business. While some businesses avoid their social responsibility, others such as charities need to have the ability to be more business savvy to survive.
- Seed accelerator – a business incubator focused on early startups. (Note: some literature sees as accelerators distinct from incubators, rather than being a subset.)
  - "Seed accelerators, also known as startup accelerators, are fixed-term, cohort-based programs, that include mentorship and educational components and culminate in a public pitch event or demo day." While traditional business incubators are typically government-funded, accelerators differ in that they can be either privately or publicly funded and focus on a huge variety of industries. Seed accelerators also differ from business incubators in that the application process for seed accelerators is open to anyone, and is highly competitive.
    - Corporate accelerator – a program of a larger company that acts akin to a seed accelerator
      - A specific type of seed accelerator which is often a subsidiary or program of larger corporations that act like seed accelerators, sponsored by an established for-profit corporation.
- Startup studio – a business incubator with interacting portfolio companies
- Venture builder: These are similar to a startup studio, but builds companies internally.
  - Venture-builders are also called tech studios, startup factories, or venture production studios. Unlike incubators and accelerators, venture builders do not take any applications and are a non-competitive program, but rather build companies using their own ideas and resource and assign internal teams of engineers, advisors, business developers, sales managers, etc. to develop them.
- Medical incubator: a business incubator focused on medical devices and biomaterials
  - This type of business incubator focuses on start-up advice for medical devices and biomaterials. Medical technologies are always changing and improving, and therefore this type of incubator is ideal for encouraging innovation and entrepreneurship within the medical field.

Industry sectors intentionally supported by incubation programs
| Technology | Creative industries | Construction |
| Computer software | eBusiness / eCommerce | Arts |
| Services/professional | Wireless technology | Aerospace |
| Manufacturing | Healthcare technology | Kitchen/Food |
| Internet | Advanced materials | Retail |
| Biosciences/life sciences | Defense/homeland security | Fashion |
| Electronics/Microelectronics | Energy/Power | Wood/forestry |
| Telecommunications | Environment/clean technologies | Tourism |
| Computer hardware | Logistics/Delivery | Manpower |
| Medical devices | Nanotechnology | Media |

More than half of all business incubation programs are "mixed-use" projects, meaning they work with clients from a variety of industries. Technology incubators account for 39% of incubation programs.

One example of a specialized type of incubator is a bio incubator. Bioincubators specialize in supporting life science-based startup companies. Entrepreneurs with feasible projects in life sciences are selected and admitted to these programs.

== Overview ==
=== Incubation process ===
Unlike many business assistance programs, business incubators do not serve any and all companies. Entrepreneurs who wish to enter a business incubation program must apply for admission. Acceptance criteria vary from program to program, but in general only those with feasible business ideas and a workable business plan are admitted. It is this factor that makes it difficult to compare the success rates of incubated companies against general business survival statistics.

Although most incubators offer their clients office space and shared administrative services, the heart of a true business incubation program is the services it provides to startup companies. More than half of incubation programs surveyed by the National Business Incubation Association in 2006 reported that they also served affiliate or virtual clients. These companies do not reside in the incubator facility. Affiliate clients may be home-based businesses or early-stage companies that have their own premises but can benefit from incubator services. Virtual clients may be too remote from an incubation facility to participate on site, and so receive counseling and other assistance electronically.

The amount of time a company spends in an incubation program can vary widely depending on a number of factors, including the type of business and the entrepreneur's level of business expertise. Life science and other firms with long research and development cycles require more time in an incubation program than manufacturing or service companies that can immediately produce and bring a product or service to market. On average, incubator clients spend 33 months in a program. Many incubation programs set graduation requirements by development benchmarks, such as company revenues or staffing levels, rather than time.

1. Eligibility
2. Admission process
3. Intellectual property
4. Seed loan
5. Infrastructure
6. Common infrastructure
7. Other services
8. Periodic assessment
9. Information submission
10. Consideration
11. Tenure in BI
12. Exit
13. Conflicts of interests and confidentiality of information
14. Disclaimer
15. Agreements

=== Goals and sponsors ===
Business incubation has been identified as a means of meeting a variety of economic and socioeconomic policy needs, which may include job creation, fostering a community's entrepreneurial climate, technology commercialization, diversifying local economies, building or accelerating growth of local industry clusters, business creation and retention, encouraging minority entrepreneurship, identifying potential spin-in or spin-out business opportunities, or community revitalization.

About one-third of business incubation programs are sponsored by economic development organizations. Government entities (such as cities or counties) account for 21% of program sponsors. Another 20% are sponsored by academic institutions, including two- and four-year colleges, universities, and technical colleges. In many countries, incubation programs are funded by regional or national governments as part of an overall economic development strategy. In the United States, however, most incubation programs are independent, community-based and resourced projects. The U.S. Economic Development Administration is a frequent source of funds for developing incubation programs, but once a program is open and operational it typically receives no federal funding; few states offer centralized incubator funding. Rents and/or client fees account for 59% of incubator revenues, followed by service contracts or grants (18%) and cash operating subsidies (15%).

As part of a major effort to address the ongoing economic crisis of the US, legislation was introduced to "reconstitute Project Socrates". The updated version of Socrates supports incubators by enabling users with technology-based facts about the marketplace, competitor maneuvers, potential partners, and technology paths to achieve competitive advantage. Michael Sekora, the original creator and director of Socrates says that a key purpose of Socrates is to assist government economic planners in addressing the economic and socioeconomic issues (see above) with unprecedented speed, efficiency and agility.

Many for-profit or "private" incubation programs were launched in the late 1990s by investors and other for-profit operators seeking to hatch businesses quickly and bring in big payoffs. At the time, NBIA estimated that nearly 30% of all incubation programs were for-profit ventures. In the wake of the dot-com bust, however, many of those programs closed. In NBIA's 2002 State of the Business Incubation survey, only 16% of responding incubators were for-profit programs. By the 2006 SOI, just 6% of respondents were for-profit.

Although some incubation programs (regardless of nonprofit or for-profit status) take equity in client companies, most do not. Only 25% of incubation programs report that they take equity in some or all of their clients.

== Incubator networks ==
Incubators often aggregate themselves into networks which are used to share good practices and new methodologies. The European Business and Innovation Centre Network (EBN) has more than 110 certified EU|BICs and more than 70 associate members in 40 countries. France has its own national network of technopoles, pre-incubators, and EU|BICs, called RETIS Innovation. This network focuses on internationalizing startups.

Of 1000 incubators across Europe, 500 are situated in Germany. Many of them are organized federally within the ADT (Arbeitsgemeinschaft Deutscher Innovations-, Technologie-, und Gründerzentren e.V.).

== Silicon Valley Founder Houses ==
San Francisco and Silicon Valley are home to 'founder houses.' These involve a collective of founders sharing an apartment or house while working to get their companies off the ground. Similar to tech/hacker houses in the same area, the founders collaborate to promote one another's success while enjoying the financial benefits of co-living in one of the most expensive regions of the country. These collectives are typically located in San Francisco or near to Stanford University's campus. Many of the founders have dropped out of Stanford University to pursue their careers– in fact, there is a more than a 1 in 10 chance that billion-dollar startups have one or more founders who attended Stanford. In addition to the financial incentives of co-living, founders share investor recommendations, funding strategies, VC contacts, and other elements critical to a startup company's success in its early days. These set-ups allow for largely virtual work, eliminating the burden on new founders to find a physical space for their company. Due to the collaborative nature of these spaces, residents who have failed companies often pivot to taking a high-ranking position at a roommate's company. Collectives such as these build on a legacy set forth by Mark Zuckerberg and Facebook. The house featured in the film The Social Network was a hacker's den rented by Zuckerberg that ultimately gave rise to a tech supergiant. This house and the fortune it gave rise to was well-documented in the 2010 film The Social Network.

== See also ==
- Science park – to support innovation on a university campus
- Flex space
