= Startup accelerator =

Organization that invests in startups

Startup accelerators, also known as seed accelerators, are fixed-term, cohort-based programs, that include mentorship and educational components, and (sometimes) culminate in a public pitch event or demo day. While traditional business incubators are often government-funded, generally take no equity, and rarely provide funding, accelerators can be either privately or publicly funded and cover a wide range of industries. Unlike business incubators, the application process for seed accelerators is open to anyone, but is highly competitive. There are specific accelerators, such as corporate accelerators, which are often subsidiaries or programs of larger corporations that act like seed accelerators.

== Distinctive qualities ==
The main differences between business incubators, startup studios, and accelerators are:

1. The application process is open to anyone but highly competitive. For instance, Y Combinator and TechStars have application acceptance rates between 1% and 3%.
2. Seed investment in startups may be made, in exchange for equity. Typically, the investment is between US$20,000 to US$50,000 in the US, or £10,000 to £50,000 in Europe.
3. The focus is generally on small teams, not on individual founders. Accelerators generally consider that one person is insufficient to handle all the work associated with a startup. However, a number of 'founder first' accelerators exist that focus on solo founders, including Entrepreneur First, Antler, Oneday and Underdog Accelerator.
4. The startups must "graduate" by a given deadline, typically after 3 months. During this time, they receive intensive mentoring and training, and they are expected to iterate rapidly. Virtually all accelerators end their programs with a "demo day", where the startups present to investors.
5. Startups are accepted and supported in cohort batches or classes (the accelerator isn't an on-demand resource). The peer support and feedback that the classes provide is an important advantage. If the accelerator doesn't offer a common workspace, the teams will meet periodically.

The primary value to the entrepreneur is derived from the mentoring, connections, and the recognition of being chosen to be a part of the accelerator. The business model is based on generating venture-style returns, not rent, or fees for services.

Seed accelerators do not necessarily need to include physical space, but many do. The process that startups go through in the accelerator can be separated into five distinct phases: awareness, application, program, demo day, and post demo day.

Accelerators provide enough funding to get a company to demo day, from which point the startup is on its own.

== History ==
The first seed accelerator was Y Combinator, started in Cambridge, Massachusetts, in 2005, and then later moved to Silicon Valley by Paul Graham. It was followed by TechStars (in 2006), Seedcamp (in 2007), AngelPad (in 2010), Startupbootcamp (in 2010), Tech Wildcatters (in 2011), several accelerators of SOSV, Forum Ventures (In 2014), Boomtown Boulder (in 2014) and Antler (in 2017).

In Europe, the first accelerator program was started by Accelerace in 2009 in Denmark (strongly subsidised by the Danish government) followed shortly after by Startup Wise Guys in 2012 in Estonia.

With the growing popularity of seed accelerator programs in the US, Europe has seen an increase in accelerators to support a growing startup ecosystem.

Forbes published an analysis of startup accelerators in April 2012. Since 2010 there has been a substantial growth of Corporate Accelerator programs, which are sponsored by established organizations but follow similar principles.

== Impact ==
Whether accelerators increase the success of accelerated firms is not always clear. A number of studies have shown that accelerated cohorts perform better than non-accelerated firms, but this is potentially due to the selection effect of programmes (i.e., the accelerators might be good at 'picking winners' rather than creating them). However, studies using regression discontinuity design show that accelerators can indeed have impact over and above their selection effect, and may also have wider ecosystem spillovers (although this does not necessarily apply to every program).

== See also ==
- Business incubator
- Corporate accelerator
- Flex space
- List of startup accelerators
