= Corporate accelerator =

A corporate accelerator is a form of seed accelerator sponsored by an established for-profit corporation. Similar to seed accelerators, they support early-stage startup companies through mentorship, often alongside capital and office space. Unlike independent accelerator programs, corporate accelerators derive their objectives from the sponsoring organization. These objectives may include keeping track of emerging trends or creating a pipeline for corporate venture capital investments.

According to the Corporate Accelerator DB, more than 70 such programs were in existence by December 2016. Microsoft, Citrix, and Telefónica were among the companies that offered such programs in the early 2010s. Corporate accelerators have also been criticised as potentially less effective than independent seed accelerators. One concern is that participating startups may become too focused on solving problems for the sponsoring company rather than finding external customers.

Corporate accelerators differ from Business incubators, which usually have a continuous intake, because accelerator programs are generally fixed-term and cohort-based. They are also distinct from corporate venture capital, which involves direct investment in selected companies.

== See also ==
- Business incubator
- Seed accelerator
