= Hermann-Josef Tenhagen =

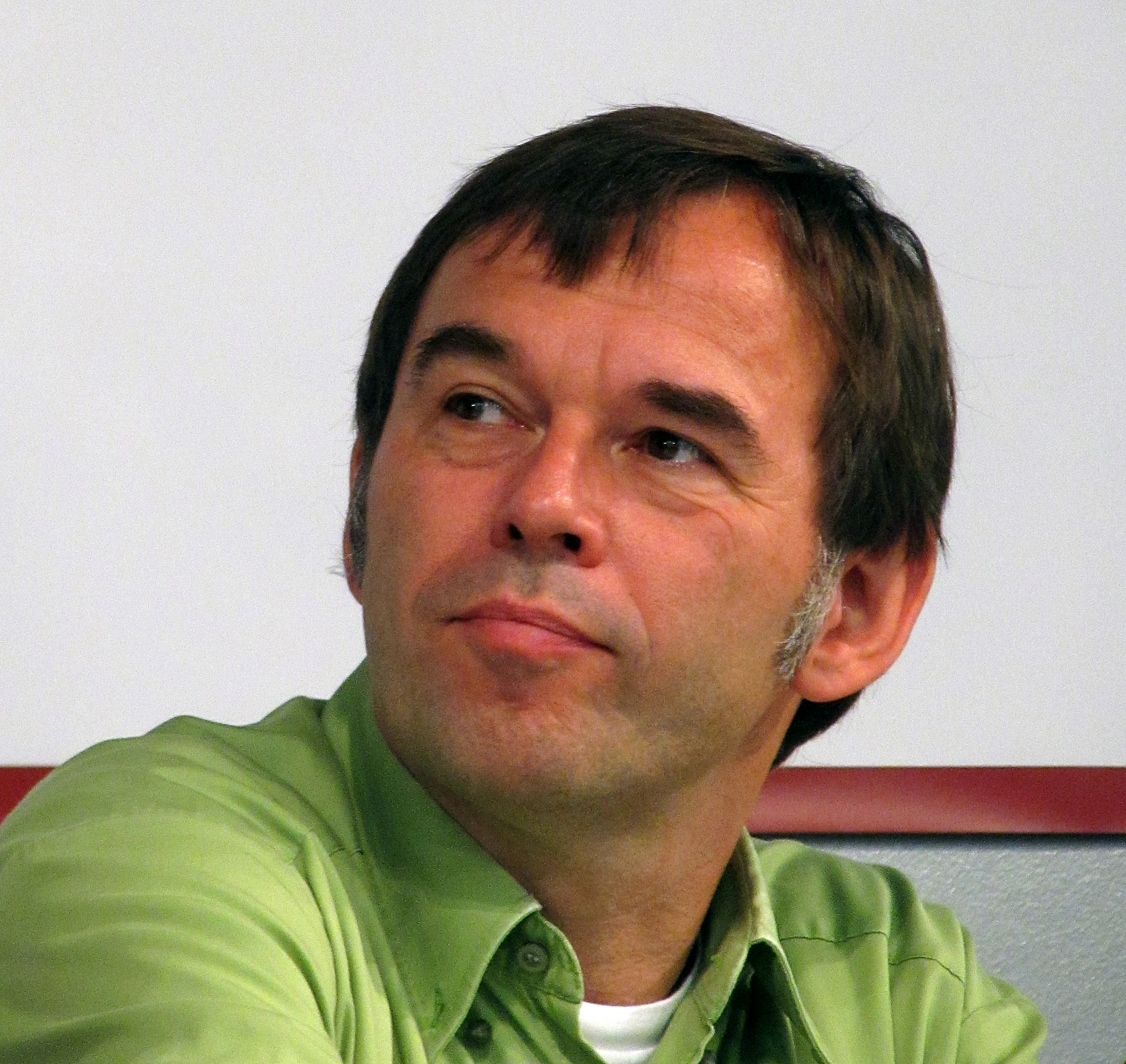
- Hermann-Josef Tenhagen (2014)
- Born: January 22, 1963 (age 63); Wesel, Germany
- Education: Rheinische Friedrich-Wilhelm University
- Occupation: Journalist
- Known for: Editor-in-chief of Finanztip

Hermann-Josef Tenhagen (born 22 January 1963) is the editor-in-chief and CEO of Finanztip since 2014, Finanztip is a non-for-profit financial information website for consumers, used c. 5 million times a month, running a weekly newsletter with a circulation of more than 1.000.000 and a popular YouTube channel. Finanztip is owned by the non-for-profit Finanztip foundation.

== Early life ==
Tenhagen was born in Wesel, Germany. After finishing school in 1982, he spent a year doing voluntary community service. He gained his first journalistic experience as a freelancer for the Rheinische Post. From 1984 to 1986 he studied political science, economics, literature and education at the Rheinische Friedrich-Wilhelm University in Bonn. He then spent one year at a graduate college in Waco, Texas, U.S., before graduating with a degree in political science at the Free University of Berlin in 1990.

== Journalist career ==
From 1988 to 1990, Hermann-Josef Tenhagen worked as a freelancer; among other things he did an internship for the Associated Press news agency and worked for local radio stations in Dortmund and Gelsenkirchen-Buer. From 1991 to 1994 he was an environmental journalist for the die Tageszeitung daily newspaper in Berlin, where he was involved in setting up the Environment and Economy Department in 1992. During a sabbatical year he then worked as a spokesman for the Klimaforum 95 (the Joint Coordination and Information Centre of German Environmental Organisations) and helped organise the activities of NGOs during the first world climate summit in Berlin in 1995.

After that he returned to the die Tageszeitung where he worked from 1995 to 1998, first as head of economy and environment, and then for the last two years also as the deputy editor-in-chief. He eventually became a member of the Die Tageszeitung Cooperative Board. In 1998 he became the head news editor of the Badische Zeitung in Freiburg im Breisgau, and in 1999 moved to Stiftung Warentest as editor-in-chief of Finanztest, the largest independent consumer magazine for financial issues in Germany.

In 2008, Hermann-Josef Tenhagen was awarded second prize as "Journalist of the year" in the category "Economy" because as the jury said, "... better than almost anybody else, he was able to explain the financial market crash in an intelligent and understandable way. His calm and credible analyses, which made him one of the most popular financial experts in the autumn of 2008, played an important role in helping to avoid a banking panic."

In 2014 he went on to head the newly founded non-for-profit Finanztip website, that intends to inform German consumers about financial issues and to make financial life easier. Finanztip with a staff of about 50 in Berlin and Munich was transformed into a non-for-profit foundation in 2020.

Hermann-Josef Tenhagen is part of the jury of Helmut-Schmidt-Journalistenpreis, Germany's most respected price for business journalists. Since 2004 Tenhagen has been a member of the board of taz, Die Tageszeitung, a big cooperative running Germanys best known leftwing daily newspaper Since 2020 Tenhagen is also member a of the board of Greenpeace Germany.

== Publications ==
- Agrarbündnis (publisher): Landwirtschaft 98 – Der kritische Agrarbericht
- Blum, Mechthild / Nesseler, Thomas (Editors): Epochenende - Zeitenwende, 1999.
- Stiftung Warentest (publisher): Sicher anlegen in der Krise, December 2008.
- Wer schlunzt, macht PR in: netzwerk recherche Werkstatt, Band 5, Kritischer Wirtschaftsjournalismus, Wiesbaden, May 2007
- Gabriele Reckinger, Volker Wolff (Herausgeber): Finanzjournalismus. Konstanz, April 2011, ISBN 978-3-86764-253-8.
- Ines Pohl (Herausgeber): 50 einfache Dinge, die Sie tun können, um die Gesellschaft zu verändern. Frankfurt/Main 2011, ISBN 978-3-938060-34-6.
- Wissenschaftlicher Beirat beim Bund der Versicherten (Herausgeber): Private Altersvorsorge/Berufsunfähigkeitsversicherung/Berichte aus der Praxis/Quotensystem/Aufsichtssystem. Baden-Baden 2013, ISBN 978-3-8329-7591-3.
- Karlheinz Sonntag (Herausgeber): Von Lissabon bis Fukushima – Folgen von Katastrophen. Heidelberg 2013, ISBN 978-3-8253-6177-8.
- Wissenschaftlicher Beirat beim Bund der Versicherten (Herausgeber): Statustransparenz bei Versicherungsvermittlern/Rechtswidrige Versicherungsbedingungen/Rückwirkende Vertragsanpassung. Baden-Baden 2014, ISBN 978-3-8487-0757-7.
- Hermann-Josef Tenhagen: Das Finanztip-Buch: Wie Sie mit wenig Aufwand viel Geld sparen. Berlin 2017, ISBN 978-3-430-20231-2.
- Hermann-Josef Tenhagen: Online-Journalisten können die Fragen der Menschen besser erkennen und deswegen besser beantworten. Warum ein Online-Verbraucherportal im Vorteil ist. In: Claudia Mast, Klaus Spachmann und Katherina Georg (Hrsg.): Kompass der Wirtschaftskommunikation. Themeninteressen der Bürger – Bewertungen der publizistischen Leistungen von Politik, Unternehmen und Journalismus. Köln 2017, ISBN 978-3-7445-1120-9, S. 231–235.
