= Stiftung Warentest =

German consumer organisation and foundation

Coordinates: 52°30′14″N 13°21′12″E

- Type: Independent foundation under civil law
- Industry: voluntary sector
- Founded: 1964 in Berlin, Germany
- Founder: Federal Republic of Germany
- Headquarters: Berlin-Tiergarten, Germany
- Area served: Germany
- Key people: Hubertus Primus
- Revenue: 53,849,000 (2018)
- Total assets: 225,459,000 (2018)
- Number of employees: 316 in Germany (2012)
- Website: www.test.de

Stiftung Warentest is a German consumer organisation and foundation involved in investigating and comparing goods and services in an unbiased way. It was founded on 4 December 1964 by the Federal Republic of Germany as an independent foundation under civil law. It is based in Berlin. Beyond its subscriber base and media coverage, content from Stiftung Warentest is disseminated through word of mouth.

== Aims and importance ==
Stiftung Warentest's aim is to compare aspects of products such as usefulness, functionality and environmental impact, and to educate consumers about those aspects.

Due to its reputation as an independent and reliable organization, the foundation has a considerable influence on the buying behavior of consumers. Good ratings and verdicts are often given great prominence in product advertising and on product packaging. In contrast, bad ratings and verdicts frequently lead to a decline in sales and thus sometimes legal action against SW by the manufacturers. According to SW, they are sued ten times a year. The foundation has never actually been ordered by the courts to pay compensation and usually wins any legal action taken against it.

== Financing ==
Stiftung Warentest is self-financing, selling its own monthly magazines test (annual circulation on average 351,000 copies) and Finanztest (211,000), books and special magazine issues, and also investigation results as paid-for content on its own website. Sales revenues in 2012 totalled approximately €39.5 million.

The foundation also receives a subsidy of €3.5 million from the Federal Ministry of Nutrition, Agriculture and Consumer Protection. This is compensation for the fact that it does not carry any advertisements in its publications because this could compromise its independence.

== Investigation work ==
Stiftung Warentest carries out more than 200 comparative product tests and investigations of services from nearly all areas of everyday life every year. Since 2002, products and services on special limited offer, mainly by the discount retailer chains, have also been investigated every week and the results quickly published. Aspects of corporate social responsibility (CSR) have been a part of the investigations of some specified products since 2004. There is also a section on investigated medication ("Medikamente im Test"), which provides information about more than 9000 medicines and 175 areas of application.

Market researchers and scientific staff are employed by Stiftung Warentest with the responsibility for selecting the products and services and the carrying out of the investigations. Each investigation project must be approved of by the Advisory Council and discussed at a meeting with advisory experts representing consumers, industry, manufacturers / retailers and providers, as well as independent experts.

The investigations are not actually carried out by Stiftung Warentest's staff members themselves, but by independent external test institutes worldwide. Test samples are purchased anonymously in shops and not provided by the manufacturers.

After the tests and the evaluations have been completed, but before publication, details of the objective results are sent to the respective manufacturers and providers for verification and so that they can make their comments. Journalists then summarise the investigation results in a form which makes them easier to read and understand. Staff members who are specifically responsible for verification make sure the published reports and investigation results concur.

Up until December 2011, Stiftung Warentest had already published information about 5,300 investigations covering about 100,000 products and 2,137 services.

== Investigation results on the website ==
Stiftung Warentest's website has all the investigation results starting in 2000, as well as current news, special online articles, an interactive calculator and free short versions of between eight and ten investigations per month. Downloading information costs between 75 cents and €2.50 for detailed investigation results, and a maximum of €5 for comprehensive product databases.

== Verdicts ==
The classification of the evaluation results is based on the marking system used in German schools. This results in the following categories for the overall verdicts on the quality of goods and services:

- 0.5–1.5: "very good"
- 1.6–2.5: "good"
- 2.6–3.5: "satisfactory"
- 3.6–4.5: "adequate"
- 4.6–5.5: "unsatisfactory"

== Organisation ==
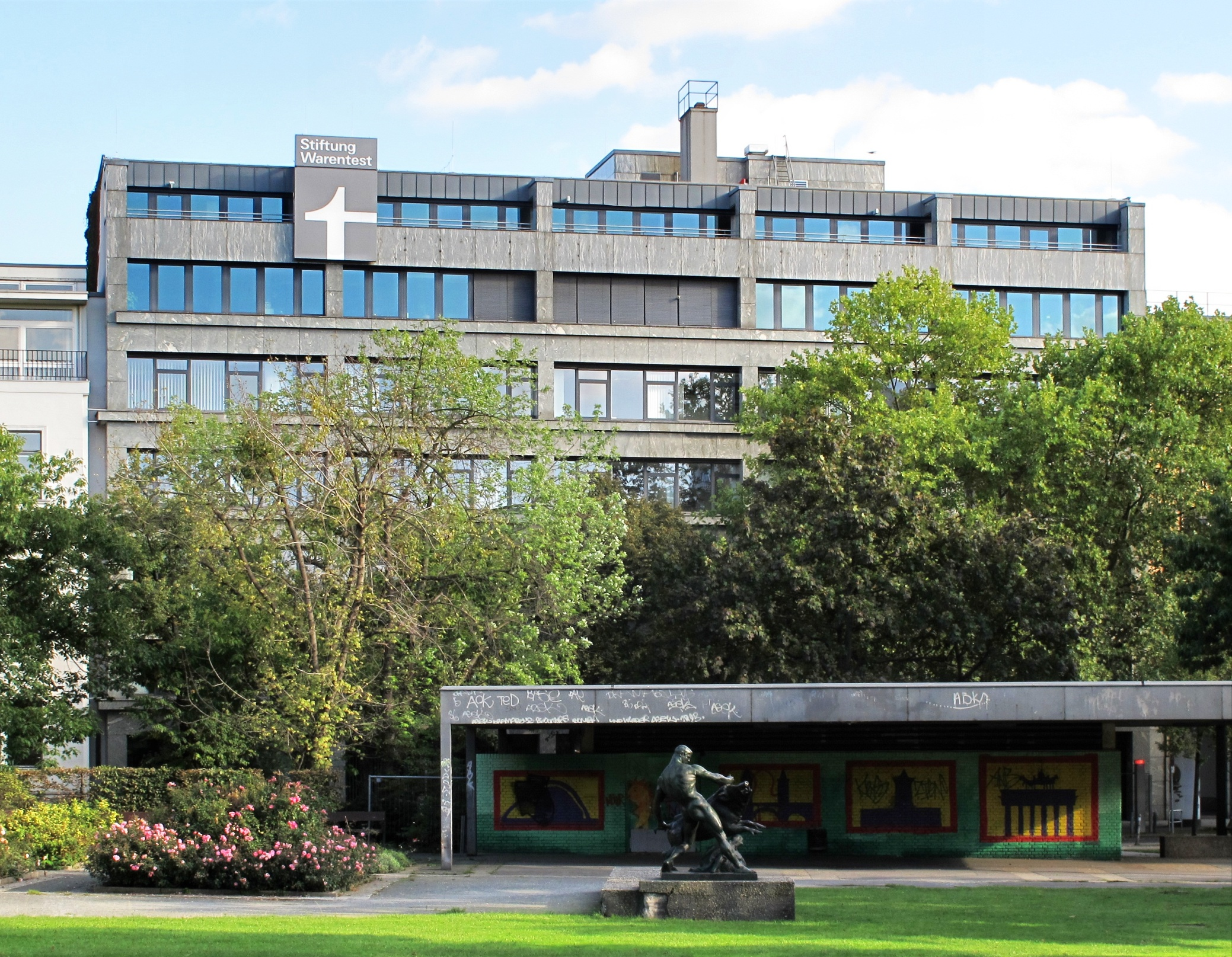
Building and seat of Stiftung Warentest in Berlin

In accordance with its statutes, Stiftung Warentest has its premises in Berlin, and there are three bodies which are responsible for different areas. The executive board conducts the foundation's business and represents it in and out of court. It comprises just one person at the present time, namely Hubertus Primus, the successor of Werner Brinkmann and Roland Hüttenrauch. The supervisory board, which has seven members, is responsible for appointing the executive board and also supervising its activities. The Advisory Council, with 18 members, advises the executive board and the supervisory board on all issues of fundamental importance.

Editor-in-chief of test is Anita Stocker, until summer 2014 editor-in-chief of Finanztest was Hermann-Josef Tenhagen and editor-in-chief of test.de is Andreas Gebauer.

Lucia A. Reisch is and Gerhard Scherhorn has been a member of the board of directors.

== Prominent cases ==
- In April 2004, a facial cream marketed by German actress Uschi Glas received a devastating rating, because the cream caused pimples and rash for people with sensitive skin, and the producer sued the foundation. In April 2005 the suit was turned down by the Landgericht Berlin court.
- In January 2006, the foundation criticized the safety of several stadiums to be used in the 2006 World Cup.
- In July 2014, Britax Römer criticized Stiftung Warentest over its 4.5 rating for the Britax Römer DUALFIX. Britax Römer argue that their overall low mark was obtained because of an “insufficient” score in the belt routing, determined through a visual observation, which affected the score for the seat construction.

== Cooperation with other institutions ==
Joint international investigations are generally carried out with members of the umbrella organisation International Consumer Research & Testing (ICRT), which is based in London. Thereby Stiftung Warentest is often responsible for the project supervision. In addition to Stiftung Warentest, the most important partner organisations are:

- Consumentenbond, The Hague, the Netherlands
- Consumer Reports, Yonkers, NY, USA
- Test Achats / Euroconsumers, Brussels, Belgium
- Union Fédérale des Consommateurs, Paris, France
- Which?, London, Great Britain.
