= Knowledge entrepreneurship =

Knowledge entrepreneurship refers to the process of utilising, leveraging, and transforming knowledge into valuable products, services, or ventures. It emphasises the application and commercialisation of knowledge, with the aim of generating both economic and social impact.

Unlike traditional economic approach to entrepreneurship, which focuses primarily on the pursuit of financial profit, knowledge entrepreneurship focuses on the generation and dissemination of knowledge, including research outputs and personal transformation. It has been proposed as a suitable model of entrepreneurship for not-for-profit educators, researchers, and educational institutions.

While the generation of economic value may be a component of knowledge entrepreneurship, this concept is often directed towards addressing social issues and contributing to positive societal change.

== Knowledge entrepreneurship ==
Following Clark the term entrepreneurial may refer not only to individuals, but also to organisations as social systems, and even to specific projects. However, in contrast to Clark's approach, the dynamic process of vision and change—key aspects of entrepreneurship (Kuratko, 2006; Schumpeter & Opie, 1934), also referred to as entrepreneuring—can be demanding and stressful. Entrepreneurship is generally understood as the pursuit of novel approaches within real-world contexts. Lumpkin and Dess (1996) defined it more specifically as "the essential act of entrepreneurship is new entry." Similarly, Brown described it as "a process of exploiting opportunities that exist in the environment or that are created through innovation in an attempt to create value" (Brown & Ulijn, 2004, p. 5).

=== Model of knowledge entrepreneurship ===
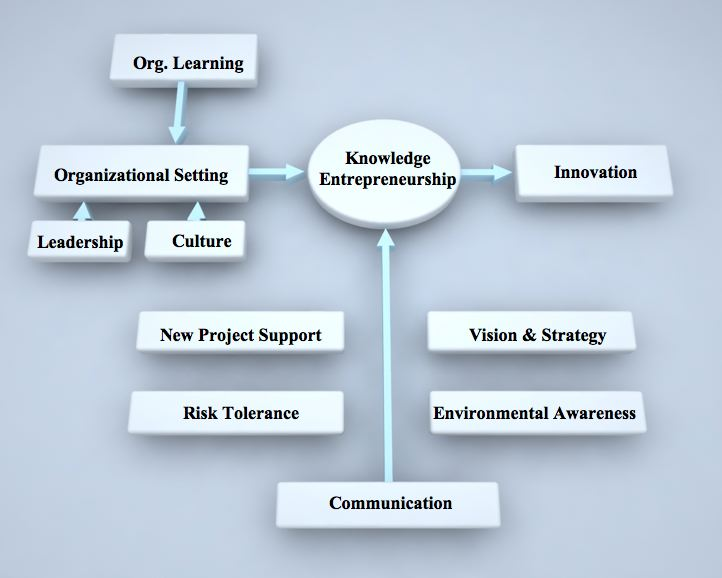
Model of knowledge entrepreneurship. Used in Senges 2007 and adapted from McDonald 2002

According to Kanter, entrepreneurs and entrepreneurial organisations "always operate at the edge of their competence, focusing more of the resources and attention on what they do not yet know (e.g. investment in R&D) than controlling what they already know." She adds:

"They measure themselves not by the standards of the past (how far they have come) but by visions of the future (how far they have yet to go). And they do not allow the past to serve as a restraint on the future; the mere fact that something has not worked in the past does not mean that it cannot be made to work in the future. And the mere fact that something has worked in the past does not mean that it should remain." (Kanter, cited in Cornwall & Perlman, 1990, pp. 27–28)

Drawing from McDonald (2002, pp. 12–33), Senges (2007) proposed a specific set of factors—referred to as attractors—that influence an organisation's capacity for knowledge entrepreneurship:

- Environmental awareness: This involves the practices and intensity with which an organisation collects information about both its internal and external environments. Cornwall and Perlman (1990) highlight its importance, stating: "Scanning should be a fundamental part of every manager's job, not something that is done by top management in conjunction with the annual update of the strategic plan" (p. 46). This includes activities such as internal needs analysis, benchmarking, and inter-organisational networking.
- Risk tolerance: This describes the organisation's attitude towards the uncertainty inherent in innovation. While this was not part of McDonald's original model, it replaces the variable known as analytical diligence.
- Vision: Referring to entrepreneuring (Kuratko, 2006), this element relates to strategic thinking and planning. It reflects an organisation's culture of envisioning and scouting for new developments.
- New project support: This indicates the extent to which new initiatives are institutionalised to foster organisational development. It includes the allocation of financial resources and managerial attention to experimental projects.
- Communication: The nature of organisational communication—its style and the richness of its channels—is considered a significant influence on knowledge entrepreneurship.

In addition, several organisational conditions affect the potential for knowledge entrepreneurship:

- Organisational setting: Refers to the organisation's size, type, business model, history, and historical approach to innovation.
- Leadership: Includes the decision-making style and values of top leadership, as well as the broader governance structure.
- Organisational culture: Central to enabling or discouraging knowledge entrepreneurship, this factor reflects attitudes toward organisational learning and whether values such as innovation, competitiveness, and entrepreneurship are embraced or resisted.

=== Outcomes ===
Knowledge entrepreneurship is expected to enhance innovation capacity, which in turn may lead to improved organisational performance. However, its most significant long-term benefit is its contribution to adaptability and sustainability:

"The most important outcome of organisational entrepreneurship is long term: an organisation that is better able to adapt and survive." (Cornwall & Perlman, 1990, p. 29)

== Review of literature ==
This section reviews a selection of works that explicitly utilise the term knowledge entrepreneur and its derivatives. While many of these works adopt a broad or varying understanding of the concept, they are cited to provide context. Among them, the PhD research conducted by McDonald (2002) appears to be the first to propose and empirically test a structured conceptualisation of the term as used here. The following paragraphs review relevant books and journal articles.

The Demos Think-Tank published a report titled Surfing the Long Wave: Knowledge Entrepreneurship in Britain (Leadbeater & Oakley, 2001). Colin Coulson-Thomas, a professor and consultant, promoted his interpretation of the concept in various articles, workshops, and in his book The Knowledge Entrepreneur (2003). Librarian Stan Skrzeszewski (2006) explored knowledge entrepreneurship within the context of the library profession.

The Demos report aimed to inform policy planning in the United Kingdom. It begins with an overview of entrepreneurship and its importance in fostering an entrepreneurial society. The report features a collection of case studies focused on the UK's creative IT industries, such as gaming and animation. Although the report does not offer a precise definition of the term, it employs knowledge entrepreneurship to describe enterprises founded on knowledge-intensive activities.

In The Knowledge Entrepreneur, Coulson-Thomas presents a management-oriented text based on his experience as a professor and board member. The book is primarily practitioner-focused, offering general chapters such as "Contemporary Information Problems" and "Requirements of Different Stakeholders." While not academic in nature, the book introduces some original ideas. For example, it distinguishes between knowledge-based and resource-based opportunities. However, a clear definition of knowledge-based opportunity is lacking, making the boundary between the two concepts difficult to establish. Coulson-Thomas also outlines eleven competencies that knowledge entrepreneurs should possess, ranging from the ability to acquire, manage, and exploit information and knowledge, to the capacity to lead knowledge workers, networked organisations, and virtual teams.

A similar title, The Knowledge Entrepreneur by Stan Skrzeszewski (2006), was originally intended to be titled The Entrepreneurial Librarian. This book provides practical guidance on how to apply entrepreneurial principles within the librarian profession. Skrzeszewski defines a knowledge entrepreneur as:

"Someone who is skilled at creating and using intellectual assets for the development of new ventures or services that will lead to personal and community wealth creation or to improved and enhanced services. The knowledge entrepreneur must have sufficient personal knowledge capital to be able to create value and/or wealth through the use of that knowledge capital."

While this definition is largely compatible with the broader conceptualisation of knowledge entrepreneurship, its emphasis on pre-existing intellectual capital and outcomes such as wealth creation or service improvement suggests a somewhat different orientation than the creation of knowledge-based products or services alone. Skrzeszewski further argues:

"The knowledge entrepreneur must know more about the subject at hand than his or her client or boss. It does not always have to be a great deal more, and sometimes the difference is based on the ability to communicate, present, or more importantly, apply the knowledge asset."

This viewpoint may not fully align with the concept of knowledge entrepreneurship, which prioritises opportunity recognition and creation over the exploitation of existing intellectual assets. Later in the text, Skrzeszewski emphasises the role of information technology in knowledge entrepreneurship, particularly in the library context. He identifies several entrepreneurial opportunities, including the digitisation of content, contextualisation of information, and the role of information intermediaries in managing information overload.

McDonald (2002), in his doctoral dissertation Knowledge Entrepreneurship: Linking Organizational Learning and Innovation, explored knowledge entrepreneurship through a comparative study of hospitals. The research investigated organisational conditions for knowledge sharing and innovation adoption, and is considered the first study to articulate distinct characteristics of knowledge entrepreneurship.

Jennifer Rowley addressed the concept in her article From Learning Organization to Knowledge Entrepreneur (2000), which examines how organisational learning can be conceptualised and leveraged. Rowley emphasises the multifaceted nature of knowledge and its implications for organisational learning. She defines a knowledge entrepreneur as an organisation that:

"Recognises the multi-faceted nature of knowledge, and the implication that this has for organisational learning. Specifically, a knowledge entrepreneur understands how to interface organisational learning and systems evolution in such a way as to optimise and capitalise on its knowledge resources in pursuit of its vision." (Rowley, 2000, p. 14)

Rowley further argues that knowledge entrepreneurship "builds bridges between people and systems." She identifies key conditions for fostering this co-evolution, including tolerance for diversity, attention to historical context and knowledge culture, and the implementation of appropriate systems for knowledge storage and dissemination.

A brief article titled It's Difficult to Innovate: The Death of the Tenured Professor and the Birth of the Knowledge Entrepreneur (Bouchikhi & Kimberly, 2001), published in Human Relations, presents a future-oriented perspective. The authors envision knowledge entrepreneurs operating under diverse employment models and being evaluated based on their ability to conceptualise, execute, and translate research into educational innovations. They describe an emerging academic environment in which scholars assume roles more akin to CEOs than traditional professors. In this scenario, academics manage their work and careers autonomously, free from conventional institutional constraints, and are part of a hierarchical system where star performers dominate.

== See also ==
- Deep tech
- Social entrepreneurship
- Political entrepreneur
- Internet Entrepreneur
- Entrepreneurship education
- Entrepreneurial Economics
