= Personalist Party =

Personalist party may refer to:

- Personalist Labor Revolutionary Party
- Business-firm party
