= Italian Disability Rights Authority =

Italian administrative authority

Logo

The Italian Disability Rights Authority (Italian: Autorità Garante nazionale dei diritti delle persone disabili, AGNDD) is an Italian quasi-autonomous non-governmental organization established on the basis of Legislative Decree No. 20 of 5 February 2024, effective as of 1 January 2025.

The Authority has been tasked with safeguarding, implementing and promoting the full spectrum of rights of persons with disabilities, in conformity with international law, European Union law and domestic legislation.

As part of its remit, it monitors the application of the Convention on the Rights of Persons with Disabilities (CRPD) in Italy, ensures uniform standards across the country, acts against both direct and indirect discrimination, and facilitates the reasonable accommodation of persons with disabilities.

== Duties ==
The main duties of the authority are:

- Monitoring compliance with laws, the Italian Constitution, the CRPD and other international treaties Italy has ratified, in order to protect the rights of persons with disabilities.
- Combating both direct and indirect discrimination, harassment, and refusal of reasonable accommodation based on disability.
- Promoting the full enjoyment of fundamental rights and freedoms by persons with disabilities, on an equal basis with others, including preventing segregation.
- Receiving reports and complaints from persons with disabilities, their representatives, associations and relevant entities; and perform investigations, either on its own initiative or following a complaint.
- Issuing reasoned opinions and make recommendations to public administrations and service providers on violations and on means of remedying them; propose action plans or interim measures when urgent violations of the non-discrimination principle are found.
- Defining and disseminating good practices, guides and models of reasonable accommodation in relation to the rights of persons with disabilities.
- Promoting a culture of respect for the rights of persons with disabilities through communication campaigns, training, initiatives, and by collaborating with other public bodies with competence in disability rights.
- Ensuring consultation, at least semi-annually, with representative organisations of persons with disabilities on matters within its remit.

== Powers ==
The authority can request information and documentation from public administrations and public‐service concessionaires. It can carry out inspections and visits, even unannounced, in public service settings (and other premises) to verify compliance with disability rights obligations. It issues opinions and recommendations on cases of alleged discrimination or rights violations, and can propose urgent interim measures when serious or irreparable harm to the rights of persons with disabilities is evident. Authority can also act in court to enforce its findings or a remedy when administrations fail to act following its opinions or recommendations.

== Board ==
The board of the authority (Collegio) is a collegial body composed of a President and two additional members, appointed by a determination jointly issued by the Presidents of the Chamber of Deputies and the Senate of the Republic. They serve for a term of four years, renewable once.

The board members since 2025 are Maurizio Borgo (President), Francesco Vaia and Antonio Pelagatti.
