= Business-firm party =

Political party centered on its leader

Andrej Babiš's ANO has been described as "an extreme form of a business-firm party".

A business-firm party, entrepreneurial party, personal party or personalist party is a type of political party that is centered on a charismatic political entrepreneur, most often created by that person to further their own interests.

== Definition ==
It can be considered "the most extreme case of party personalization, consisting in the full control by an individual leader of the party he has himself created", in the words of political scientist Mauro Calise. A business-firm party is modeled off the top-down organizational structure of a corporation as opposed to operating on the basis of internal party democracy. The party structure is related to the older type of elite party, but is even more strongly oligarchic in form, as the political entrepreneur maintains complete control of the party's assets. The entrepreneur controls all aspects of the party's platform and campaigning, plays the ultimate role in selecting candidates to run in elections, managing the party's resources, and wielding party discipline over other politicians in the party.

One characteristic distinguishing them from other parties is that the party organization is either dormant or limited outside of campaign seasons, and members are actively discouraged from becoming more involved in the party, therefore leading entrepreneurial parties to lack grassroots capacity. Entrepreneurial parties may have only one member, the party leader (as in the case of Party for Freedom or the Ticino League), or very few aside from politicians. The Party for Freedom initially did not recruit members out of fear of infiltration by the far-right; later, deputy leader Martin Bosma said that a party membership structure interfered with direct accountability between party leadership and voters. In a completely memberless business-firm party, volunteers, donors, and officeholders invest time, money, and their reputation (if the party is controversial) without any formal say in the party's operations.

== Causes and effects ==
More monocratic systems of government, such as presidential systems, tend to encourage the formation of personal parties while the personalization of politics fuels the centralization of power. Entrepreneurial parties tend to be short-lived and rarely outlast their founders, except where the entrepreneur is successful in using his charisma to build a mass-membership party, as in the case of the Finns Party. Due to the lack of grassroots mobilization, leader-oriented parties may be less successful in local and regional politics, which are more distant from the charismatic leader, as occurred with ANO 2011 and Forza Italia.

Entrepreneurial parties are commonly far-right, nationalist, and/or populist. However, another tendency is not to have a firm ideology and instead closely follow opinion polls while being vague or self-contradictory on the party's standpoint. Tatiana Kostadinova and Barry Levitt argue that in a personalist party, "interactions between the leader and other politicians are driven mainly by loyalty to that leader rather than, for example, organizational rules, ideological affinities, or programmatic commitments". Business-firm parties are likely to emerge in new democracies and in situations of high electoral volatility. They may also result from declines in political participation and membership in traditional parties. In central Europe, entrepreneurial parties have formed as a type of state capture where state powers are used for private benefit. Entrepreneurial parties are especially common in Latin America. In Slovakia, the personal Freedom and Solidarity party has a market-liberal ideology.

== Constitutionality ==
The Basic Law for the Federal Republic of Germany requires that political parties "conform to democratic principles" in their internal organization. When the Socialist Reich Party was banned in 1952, the Federal Constitutional Court's judgement stated: "If a party's internal organization does not correspond to democratic principles, one may generally conclude that the party seeks to impose upon the state the structural principles that it has implemented within its own organization." The constitutions of Portugal, Spain, Argentina, and Turkey include similar provisions. Israeli jurist Yigal Mersel argues that non-democratically organized parties are undesirable because "There is a greater likelihood of the pursuit of nondemocratic goals in parties that have a nondemocratic structure."

== Examples ==
=== Asia ===
==== Georgia ====
- Georgian Dream (Bidzina Ivanishvili)

==== Indonesia ====
- Perindo (Hary Tanoesoedibjo)

==== Israel ====
- Hatnua (Tzipi Livni)
- New Right, Yamina, Bennett 2026 (Naftali Bennett)
- Blue and White, Israel Resilience Party, National Unity (Benny Gantz)
- Kulanu (Moshe Kahlon)
- Yesh Atid (Yair Lapid)
- Yisrael Beiteinu (Avigdor Lieberman)

==== Thailand ====
- Thai Rak Thai Party (Thaksin Shinawatra)

==== Turkey ====
- Rights and Equality Party (Osman Pamukoğlu)
- Young Party (Cem Uzan)

=== Africa ===
==== Lesotho ====
- Revolution for Prosperity under Sam Matekane's leadership

=== Europe ===
==== Austria ====
- Freedom Party of Austria under Jörg Haider's leadership
- Team Stronach for Austria (Frank Stronach)

==== Belgium ====
- Lijst Dedecker (Jean-Marie Dedecker)

==== Czech Republic ====
- Public Affairs (Vít Bárta)
- ANO 2011 (Andrej Babiš)
- Dawn of Direct Democracy (Tomio Okamura)
- Freedom and Direct Democracy (Tomio Okamura)

==== Finland ====
- Finns Party

==== France ====
- National Rally (Marine Le Pen)

==== Hungary ====
- Fidesz (Viktor Orbán)

==== Italy ====
- Forza Italia (Silvio Berlusconi)
- Popolo della Libertà (Berlusconi)
- Italy of Values (Antonio Di Pietro)

==== Lithuania ====
- Labour Party (Viktor Uspaskich)

==== Netherlands ====
- Pim Fortuyn List (Pim Fortuyn)
- Party for Freedom (Geert Wilders)

==== Norway ====
- Progress Party (Anders Lange)

==== Poland ====
- Modern (Ryszard Petru)
- Kukiz'15 (Paweł Kukiz)
- Palikot Movement (Janusz Palikot)

==== Romania ====
- People's Party – Dan Diaconescu (Dan Diaconescu)

==== Serbia ====
- Strength of Serbia Movement (Bogoljub Karić)

==== Slovakia ====
- We Are Family (Boris Kollár)
- Slovakia (Igor Matovič)
- Freedom and Solidarity (Richard Sulík)

==== Spain ====
- Union of the Democratic Centre (Adolfo Suárez)

==== Switzerland ====
- Ticino League (Giuliano Bignasca)

=== Oceania ===
==== Australia ====
- Tasmanian Independent Senator Brian Harradine Group (Brian Harradine)
- John Madigan's Manufacturing and Farming Party
- Katter's Australian Party (Bob Katter)
- Palmer United Party (Clive Palmer)
- Glenn Lazarus Team (Glenn Lazarus)
- Jacqui Lambie Network (Jacqui Lambie)
- David Pocock (David Pocock)
- Pauline Hanson's One Nation (Pauline Hanson)

=== South America ===
==== Peru ====
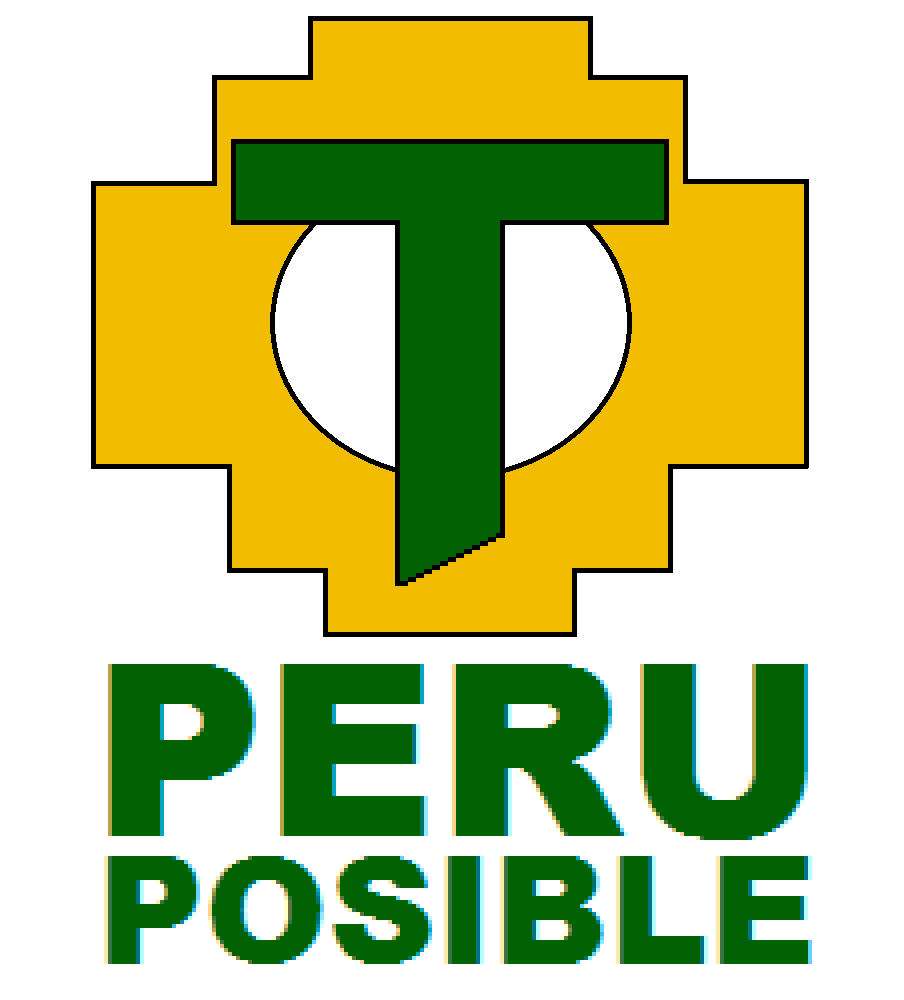
Alejandro Toledo's Possible Peru

Keiko Fujimori's Popular Force

Ollanta Humala's Peruvian Nationalist Party

César Acuña's Alliance for Progress

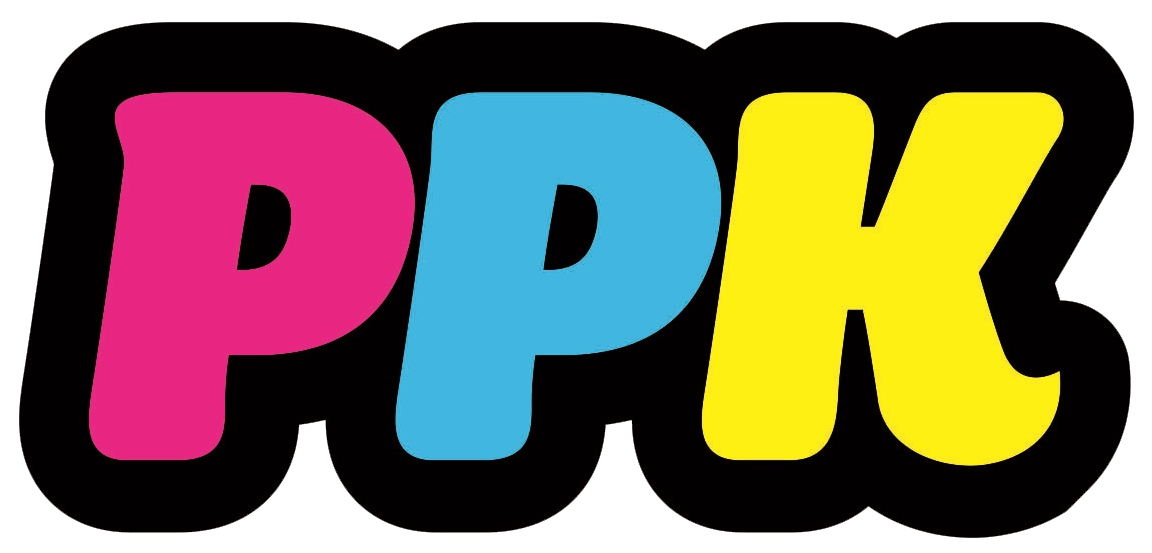
Pedro Pablo Kuczynski's Peruvians for Change

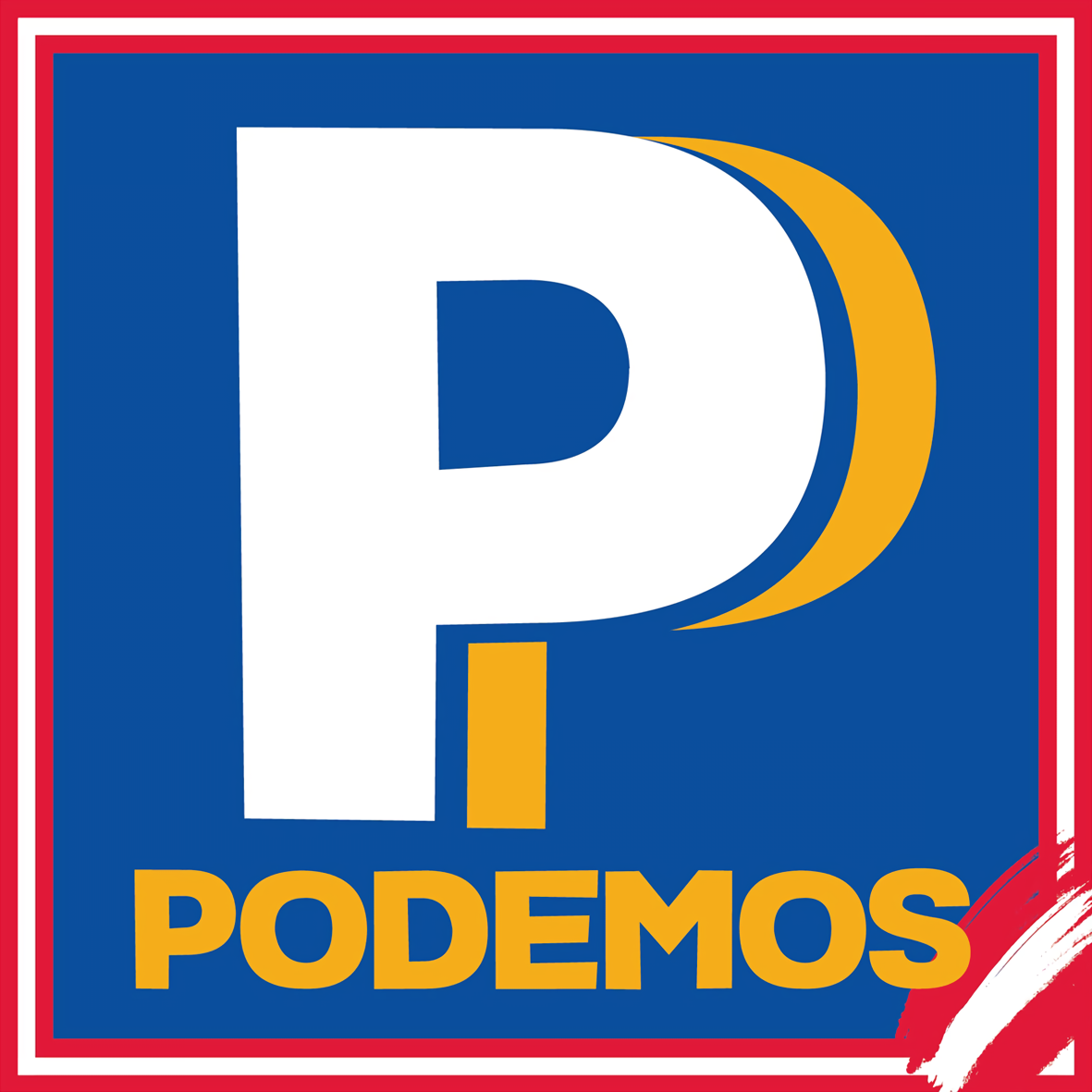
José "Pepe" Luna's Podemos Peru

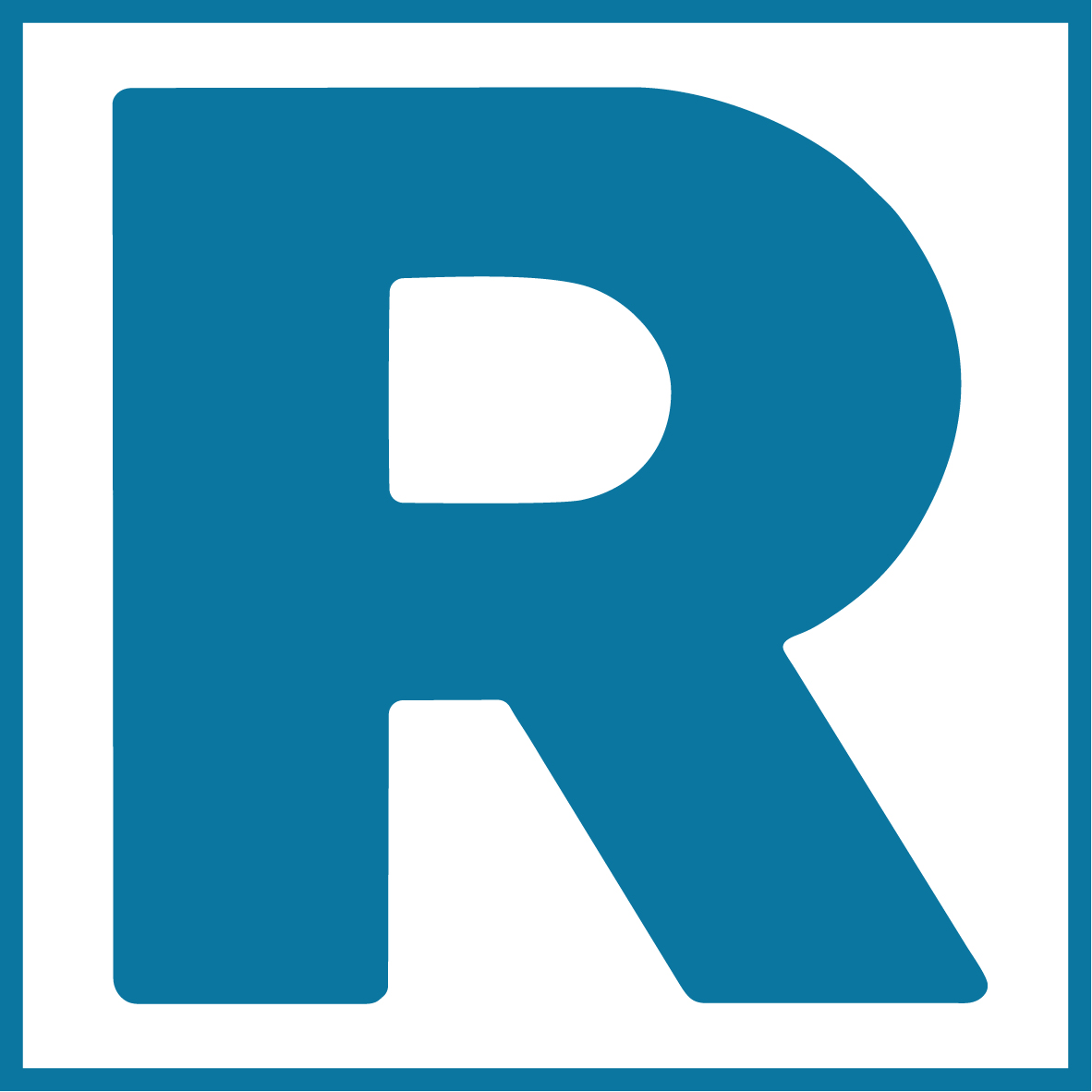
Rafael López Aliaga's Popular Renewal

The personalism of many Peruvian political parties is reflected in their logos.
- Cambio 90 (Alberto Fujimori)
- Sí Cumple (Alberto Fujimori)
- Peru 2000 (Alberto Fujimori)
- Civic Party OBRAS (Ricardo Belmont)
- National Solidarity (Luis Castañeda)
- Possible Peru (Alejandro Toledo)
- Popular Force (Keiko Fujimori)
- Peruvian Nationalist Party (Ollanta Humala)
- Alliance for Progress (César Acuña)
- Peruvians for Change, PPK (Pedro Pablo Kuczynski)
- Podemos Perú (José Luna)
- Popular Renewal (Rafael López Aliaga)
- Peru First (Martín Vizcarra)
- National Alliance of Workers, Farmers, University Students, and Reservists, ANTAURO (Antauro Humala)

== See also ==
- Authoritarian leadership style
- Cult of personality
- Trumpism

== Sources ==
- Musella, Fortunato (2018). Political Leaders Beyond Party Politics. doi:10.1007/978-3-319-59348-7. ISBN 978-3-319-59347-0.
