= Entrepreneurial orientation =

Entrepreneurial orientation (EO) is a company-level strategic orientation assessment which captures an organization's strategy-making practices, managerial philosophies, and firm behaviors that are entrepreneurial in nature.

== History ==
By 2015, Entrepreneurial orientation had become one of the established and researched constructs in the entrepreneurship literature. A general commonality among past conceptualizations of EO is the inclusion of innovativeness, proactiveness, and risk-taking as core defining aspects or dimensions of the orientation.

EO has been shown to be a strong predictor of firm performance with a meta-analysis of past research indicating a correlation in magnitude roughly equivalent to the prescription of taking sleeping pills and getting better sleep. Still, some research has argued that EO does not enhance the performance for all firms. Instead, EO can be argued not to be a simple performance enhancing attribute but rather enhancing if it is applied under the right circumstances of the firm. In some cases, EO can even be disadvantageous for firms, if the situation of the firm does not fit with applying EO. Different situations (also known as context) can be the environment that the firm is situated within or internal situations such as structure and strategy.

== Assessment ==
Entrepreneurial orientation has most frequently been assessed using a nine-item psychometric instrument developed by Jeff Covin and Dennis Slevin. This instrument captures the perspective of Danny Miller that EO is a ‘collective catchall’ construct which represents what it means for a firm to be considered entrepreneurial across a wide range of contexts. A seminal quote from Miller (1983, p. 780):

“In general, theorists would not call a firm entrepreneurial if it changed its technology or product line simply by directly imitating competitors while refusing to take any risks. Some proactiveness would be essential as well. By the same token, risk-taking firms that are highly leveraged financially are not necessarily entrepreneurial. They must also engage in product market or technological innovation.”

Reviews of the Entrepreneurial orientation literature indicate that the majority of prior studies have adopted Miller's perspective of EO as the combination of innovativeness, proactiveness, and risk-taking.

Lumpkin and Dess offer an alternative view of EO as the combination of five dimensions, those put forth by Miller/Covin and Slevin as well as competitive aggressiveness and autonomy. Moreover, they suggest that additional insights stand to be gained from investigating the dimensions independently. Proceeding research has suggested that there is value in examining EO according to either conceptualization depending upon the demands of the research question being addressed. Research on the individual dimensions of risk-taking, proactiveness and innovativeness has found that the dimensions can combine in different ways to form configurations.

Taken together, as a strategic orientation EO enhances firm performance as well as overall variance in a firm’s performance. Increased variance occurs as result of the observation that many entrepreneurial actions ultimately fail to generate an economic return thereby contributing to an increased distribution of firm performance outcomes. As a core firm strategic orientation, the breadth and depth of research on EO continues to expand as the concept is adopted to understand the effects of being entrepreneurial across an increasing number of research contexts.

The recent study has extended into green entrepreneurial orientation, which highlights the green technological leadership, green products, green administrative techniques, and green operation technology.

However, the traditional use of EO has been focused on explanations, such as those within natural science, combined with a conception of entrepreneurs as possessing exceptional traits or exceptional risk-takers, as heroic individuals: these perspectives are incorrect. Recent studies propose a critical process re-conceptualization of EO aimed at opportunity designing in uncertain contexts as well as (proto) organizational projects. The major contributions are theoretical frameworks or empirical works under a process perspective that brings together research fields that have been isolated for too long, focusing on the interplay between routines and artifacts (as rules), agency and structure, sense-making and decision-making.
