= Extrapreneur =

Extrapreneur is an entrepreneurial dynamic based on collaborative and systemic economy, consisting of alliances between various private companies, public authorities and citizens, in order to create new activities solving joint issues.

== See also ==
- Ikigai
- Entrepreneurship
- Intrapreneurship
- Fablab
