= Business opportunity =

Sale or lease enabling the start of a business

A business opportunity refers to a situation in which a product, service, or idea can be offered commercially to meet a market need and generate profit; thereby creating the potential to launch a new business. A business opportunity can also be understood as the process of selling or leasing products, services, equipment, or other resources to help buyers or renters to start a new business. In some cases, it may include support or guidance, such as choosing a location or supplying the main product. The party offering the business opportunity may promise to help the buyer find a suitable location or directly provide them with the desired product. This is different from an outright sale of an independent business, where there is no need to maintain a long-term relationship between the seller and the buyer. A business opportunity provides a way to start a business without the need to maintain ongoing connections like buying an independent business.

Eckhardt and Shane (2003) argue that the identifying business opportunities is a key influencing factor on the road to future entrepreneurship. In simpler terms, spotting a good opportunity is often the first and most important step toward starting a successful business. This is seen as the lynchpin around which the promise of entrepreneurial venture is to be built. According to Shane, individuals must have prior knowledge and the necessary cognitive ability to recognize the of that knowledge in order to identify the new opportunity. For example, someone who has worked in the coffee industry might notice a growing trend in specialty cafes and decide to open their own. People with relevant prior knowledge in a particular domain are more likely to identify new business opportunities within that domain.

== Concept ==
A common type of business opportunity involves a company that sells bulk vending machines and promises to secure suitable locations for the machines. The purchaser is counting on the company to find locations where sales will be high enough to enable them to recoup their expenses and make a profit.

However, some companies have misled buyers by overstating potential profits or failing to deliver promised support. These are known as fraudulent business opportunities. Because of the many cases of fraudulent biz-ops in which companies have not followed through on their promises, or in which profits were much less than what the company led the investor to believe, governments closely regulate these operations.

In the United States, the Federal Trade Commission receives complaints and helps coordinate enforcement action against fraudulent business opportunities.

== Identifying business opportunity ==
A business opportunity consists of four elements, which are usually present together within the same domain or geographical area before it can be considered a valid opportunity. These four elements are:

- A need (Business opportunities are almost everywhere, as long as the product type is related to some basic and ongoing human need or desire);
- The means to fulfill the need (e.g., resources, technology, or expertise);
- A method to apply the means (such as strategies, operations, or distribution channels);
- A method to benefit (a way to generate value, like profit or impact).

If one of these elements is missing, the opportunity can still be developed by identifying and addressing the gap. A desirable characteristic is for the combination of elements to be unique. The more control an institution (or individual) has over the elements, the better they are positioned to exploit the opportunity and become a niche market leader.

Business opportunities do not exist in isolation, but need someone to be able to take advantage of it to call it a real opportunity. The mere existence of a gap in the market or a good ideal product does not count as an opportunity, because they may not be used effectively. The definition of a business opportunity depends on the existence of an entity with the appropriate capabilities and resources to seize and exploit it.

The concept of “identifying business opportunities” is only meaningful when considered in relation to a specific individual or organization. Business opportunities do not inherently exist. In a sense, it only really exists if it is being exploited or has been exploited - in which case it is not difficult to identify.

Whether the business opportunity is real depends on whether there are individuals or enterprises with the appropriate ability and resources to identify and take advantage of it. An opportunity that cannot be acted upon remains a potential idea, not an actual opportunity. The challenge of spotting business opportunities is that they are often not clearly identified until they have been exploited. When the opportunity first arises, it may only be an ambiguous potential that needs to be fully determined through actual operation and verification.

The availability and quality of business opportunities are influenced by both external and internal factors. External factors include market conditions, industry trends, and competition, while internal factors involve a company’s strategic positioning, management capabilities, and operational strengths.

Opportunities for business growth are more likely to emerge in competitive environments. They must be identified and then transformed into value by management. Businesses need to build internal capabilities and establish strong relationships with external stakeholders to take advantage of potential opportunities that might otherwise remain uncoordinated or underutilized.
