= Monocracy =

Government based on the personal rule of an individual

Monocracy is a form of government and political system based on the personal rule of an individual without a specific origin, legitimacy, or rules for exercising and transferring power. It can also take the form of a dictatorship exercised in the name of a republic or democracy, or in the name of the people. The term doesn't refer to traditional monarchy and has a broader meaning. Monocracy is typically contrasted with collegial body, where power and authority are vested equally in each of a number of colleagues, rather than in a single individual.

According to its etymology and literal meaning, the term monocracy includes all varieties of autocracy; in practice, however, a modified definition excluding non-monarchic and non-dynastic forms has been adopted in the political science literature. While monarchy is a system in which "the rule of one" is a universally accepted principle — justified by tradition and clarified by a number of rules defining the order and mode of assuming power, exercising it, and transferring it — the ruler of a monocracy can come to power in unpredictable, case-by-case ways, both legal and illegal. A monocratic ruler's power comes "out of nowhere"; the fact that they hold personal power may or may not be officially proclaimed and promulgated, and the question of succession remains open.

"Accidentality" in this case may also mean a situation in which the ruler becomes a monocrat against their original aspirations and intentions, as a result of the internal logic of the development of events, to which they contributed to some extent. Whatever title such a ruler adopts, they are always a "new prince" (il principe nuovo) in the sense defined by Niccolò Machiavelli as the one who did not inherit power, but gained it "by others or by his own weapons, by luck or personal valor" (Prince, I, 1).

Monocratic systems have occurred in all eras and civilizations, but as a rule they appear in "transitional" times of crisis of the previously dominant system, such as Greek aristocratic or democratic polis, the Roman Republic, and modern parliamentary democracy. Monocracies emerging from such systems include Greek tyrannies, Roman dictatorships for an unlimited period at the end of the Republic (Sulla, then Caesar), Oliver Cromwell's protectorate in the Commonwealth of England, and Napoleon Bonaparte's consulate at the end of the French First Republic.

In the twentieth century, monocracies appeared in authoritarian systems — including Józef Piłsudski in Poland, António de Oliveira Salazar in Portugal, Francisco Franco in Spain, Philippe Pétain in the French state, Getúlio Vargas in Brazil, and Juan Perón in Argentina — as well as totalitarian ones, e.g. Benito Mussolini in Italy, Adolf Hitler in Germany, Joseph Stalin in the USSR, Mao Zedong in communist China, and Kim Il Sung in North Korea.

== Sources ==
- Waters, Malcolm (1989). "Collegiality, Bureaucratization, and Professionalization: A Weberian Analysis". American Journal of Sociology. 94 (5). University of Chicago Press: 945–972.
