= Political entrepreneur =

The term political entrepreneur may refer to any of the following:

- Someone (usually active in the fields of either politics or business) who founds a new political project, group, or political party
- A businessman who seeks to gain profit through subsidies, protectionism, government contracts, or other such favorable arrangements with government(s) through political influence (also known as a rent-seeker)
- An individual who identifies and acts upon opportunities to influence political outcomes, often by introducing innovative ideas or policies
- An individual leveraging political connections to access resources and influence policy decisions, often leading to institutional distortion.

== Politician ==
In the field of business, entrepreneurship involves people taking a risk in order to create new business ventures, to gain advantage over a competitor, and to maximize profits. Political entrepreneurship involves a multitude of people all who want to make a difference or change within policies, political parties, or projects. They are different from other government agents and officials.

=== History and cultural context ===
Political entrepreneur was a term introduced as early as Robert Dahl's Who Governs.

Its use, however, can be traced back to multi-ethnic coalitions, who after years of political struggles began to make changes. This caused for the decline of the leader within these coalitions and rather cause for the growth of a government who had the interest of the people. This form of political entrepreneurship was for the communal interest.

In history, partisan entrepreneurs, another term for political entrepreneur, have tried to change the way the government is structured altering power administrations. This can also cause for reinterpretation of political laws, policies or founding documents in order to make these changes.

The political activism of American business as a class has surged and ebbed at various historical moments. Variations in both business and countervailing political mobilization should be approached as problems of collective interpretation and action. Partisan leaders, not businesses or other policy-seekers themselves, have the strongest incentives to absorb the transaction costs associated with either broad-scale business or countervailing collective action. When partisan entrepreneurs see an opportunity to alter the distribution of power at the national level, they engage in a discursive exercise to remold business or oppositional interests and undertake the mobilization of these interests.

An analytical framework for dealing with political entrepreneurship and reform was proposed by Michael Wohlgemuth "based on some new combinations of Schumpeterian political economy, an extended version of Tullock's model of democracy as franchise-bidding for natural monopoly and some basic elements of New Institutional Economics. It is shown that problems of insufficient award criteria and incomplete contracts which may arise in economic bidding schemes, also—and even more so—characterize political competition. At the same time, these conditions create leeway for Schumpeterian political entrepreneurship. The same is true for various barriers to entry in politics. These barriers affect a trade-off between political stability and political contestability which will be discussed with special emphasis on incentives and opportunities for political entrepreneurship in the sense of risking long-term investments in basic political reforms."

== Businessperson ==
The term political entrepreneur may also be used to contrast a pure "market entrepreneur" with someone that uses the political system to further a commercial venture or their own career. On this definition a political entrepreneur is a business entrepreneur who seeks to gain profit through subsidies, protectionism, government contracts, or other such favorable arrangements with government agents through political influence and lobbying (also referred to as corporate welfare).

Ed Younkins (in 2000) wrote: "Political entrepreneurs seek and receive help from the state and, therefore, are not true entrepreneurs." Similarly, Thomas DiLorenzo says, "a political entrepreneur succeeds primarily by influencing government to subsidize his business or industry, or to enact legislation or regulation that harms his competitors." He says, in contrast, the "market entrepreneur succeeds financially by selling a newer, better, or less expensive product on the free market without any government subsidies, direct or indirect." He gives the example of a mousetrap manufacturer who seeks to gain market share by making a better mousetrap as a market entrepreneur, and a manufacturer who lobbies Congress to ban the importation of foreign-made mousetraps as a political entrepreneur.

In practice, the division between the market entrepreneur and the political entrepreneur can have overlap. Many share characteristics of both types of entrepreneur—political and business—to varying degrees. The term appears to have been coined by Burton W. Folsom Jr. in his book, The Myth of the Robber Barons.

== See also ==
- Corporate welfare
- Crony capitalism
- Cronyism
- Entrepreneurial party
- Graft (politics)
- Insider trading
- Policy entrepreneur
- Politician
- Social entrepreneur
