= Collegial body =

Type of governing body

Collegial body (or collegiate body, collegial executive, collective executive) is a governmental or organizational entity in which power and authority are vested equally in each of a number of colleagues, rather than in a single individual. This structure is typically contrasted with monocratic authority (bureaucracy), where power is held by a single chief or executive and flows through a hierarchy.

In sociology and political science, collegiality is analyzed both as a historical mechanism for limiting arbitrary power and as a modern structural adaptation in organizations dominated by professionals.

== Weberian analysis ==
In his analysis of authority, Max Weber defined collegiality primarily as a method of limiting monocratic authority. According to Weber, a collegial body exists when administrative acts are legitimate only if produced by the cooperation of a plurality of individuals, typically through unanimity or majority vote.

=== Contrast with monocracy ===
Weber viewed collegiality and bureaucracy as opposing principles of organization. While bureaucracy is characterized by hierarchy, individual accountability, and imperative coordination (monocracy), collegiality is characterized by equality, consensus, and shared responsibility.

Weber argued that while collegiality promotes thoroughness in decision-making and prevents the abuse of power by a single leader, it is technically inferior to monocratic bureaucracy. Specifically, collegiality "unavoidably obstructs the promptness of decision, the consistency of policy, the clear responsibility of the individual, and ruthlessness to outsiders." Consequently, Weber observed a historical trend where collegiality inevitably recedes in the face of the need for rapid, efficient decision-making in large-scale states and capitalist enterprises.

=== Types of collegiality ===
Weber distinguished several forms of collegial bodies based on the distribution of power among members:

- Mutual Veto: A system where monocratic officials hold equal authority and possess the power to veto each other's acts. A historical example is the Roman Consuls.
- Mandatory Consultation: A monocratic leader is required to consult with a body of formally equal members before taking action. If deep disagreement occurs, the body may dissolve, endangering the leader's position. Weber cites the British Cabinet and Prime Minister as an example of this "primus inter pares" (first among equals) structure.
- Advisory Bodies: Bodies that are formally advisory but exercise effective control because the leader relies on them to avoid failure or loss of support. The Roman Senate historically functioned in this manner.
- Supreme Collegial Authority: A system where the highest executive authority itself is collegial to prevent any single individual from attaining undue power. Weber identifies the Swiss Federal Council as a key example, noting its members lacked fixed functional portfolios and rotated leadership.

== In professional organizations ==
While Weber predicted the decline of collegiality in political spheres, sociologists such as Malcolm Waters (1989) and Talcott Parsons argue that collegial structures remain persistent and functional within organizations dominated by professionals (e.g., universities, hospitals, law firms). In these contexts, authority is based on technical competence rather than official jurisdiction.

=== Ideal-type of collegiate organization ===
Waters identifies an ideal-type of collegiate organization that contrasts with the bureaucratic ideal-type. It is characterized by six key features:

1. Theoretical knowledge: The organization is arranged around the application of specialized, theoretical knowledge rather than routine administration.
2. Professional career: Members act based on vocational commitment rather than just employment contracts. Advancement and tenure are determined by peer election based on expertise.
3. Formal egalitarianism: Members are formally equal (e.g., all professors are equal), masking actual differences in performance or prestige.
4. Formal autonomy: The body is self-policing and free from external bureaucratic or commercial interference.
5. Scrutiny of product: Work is subject to peer review and collective scrutiny (e.g., academic publishing, second opinions in medicine) rather than supervisory oversight.
6. Collective decision making: Decisions are made through committees (e.g., academic senates) aimed at achieving consensus among experts.

=== Internal dynamics and power ===
Research by Noble and Pym (1970) highlights that the reality of collegial bodies often deviates from the democratic ideal, creating specific power dynamics:

- Involuted hierarchy: Professional organizations often develop a complex, inward-turning network of committees to manage the conflict between administrative efficiency and professional autonomy.
- Receding locus of power: Decision-making in these bodies often appears elusive to outsiders. Lower-level committees claim they can only make recommendations, while higher-level bodies claim they merely ratify decisions made elsewhere. This confirms Weber's observation that collegiality diffuses personal responsibility.
- Opacity and latent oligarchy: While formally democratic, collegial bodies often develop an informal, latent oligarchy based on access to "structural resources," such as membership in key vetting committees and access to system-relevant information. This power structure remains "opaque" to preserve the professional ethic of equality among peers.

=== Types of collegiate organizations ===
Because collegiality often coexists with bureaucracy, organizations can be classified by their proximity to the collegial ideal:

- Exclusively collegiate: Small-scale, private organizations where authority is undivided by bureaucracy (e.g., small professional partnerships).
- Predominantly collegiate: Large organizations where professionals manage internal affairs democratically, but external relations and resources are mediated by a bureaucracy (e.g., universities, hospitals).
- Intermediate collegiate: Organizations where professionals are subordinate to a bureaucratic administration and collegial bodies are merely advisory (e.g., social welfare agencies, schools).

=== Status group closure ===
From a neo-Weberian perspective, collegiality is not just a method of democratic integration but a mechanism for status group closure. By establishing self-policing collegial bodies, professionals protect their market monopoly, exclude outsiders via credentialism, and shield their practices from public accountability and bureaucratic control.

== Political science and comparative government ==
In comparative politics, a collegial executive is defined as a regime where a specific institutional design grants executive power to a group of individuals in equal shares. These members are typically elected (directly or indirectly) to perform the same tasks, and no single member holds institutional supremacy over the others.

This definition distinguishes true collegial executives from other collective bodies:

- Cabinets: In parliamentary systems, cabinets are selected rather than elected, and members depend on the confidence of a prime minister or president.
- Military juntas: While they may operate collectively, members typically seize power rather than being elected to a specific collegial office.

=== Arguments for and against ===
The utility of collegial executives is a subject of debate in democratic theory:

- Arguments for: Proponents argue that collegial executives act based on broad consensus, utilize collective intelligence, and check the "cult of personality" or authoritarian impulses of single leaders.
- Arguments against: Critics contend that multiple veto players reduce decisiveness, making governability harder to achieve. They are often dismissed as "administratively cumbersome" and "inimical to resolute decision making."

=== Historical and contemporary examples ===
Historically, collegial executives trace their lineage to Sparta, the Roman Republic, and the Italian city-states of the Renaissance.

==== Contemporary national governments ====
- Switzerland: The Swiss Federal Council (Bundesrat) is the most prominent contemporary example, having functioned continuously since 1848.
- Uruguay: Uruguay is unique as a robust democracy that alternated between a single-person presidency and a collegial executive (the National Council of Government) twice in the 20th century (1919–1933 and 1952–1967). Empirical analysis suggests that the adoption of the collegial executive in Uruguay did not negatively affect the country's level of democracy, challenging the view that such systems inevitably lead to democratic deterioration.
- Bosnia and Herzegovina: The Presidency of Bosnia and Herzegovina is a contemporary collegial body composed of three members representing the country's major ethnic groups.
- San Marino: The Captains Regent serve as a collegial head of state, continuing a tradition from the 13th century.
- France: The Council of Ministers is the only collegial body explicitly provided for in the Constitution.

==== International organizations ====
International organizations often utilize collegial bodies similar to the German model. Examples include:

- Judicial: The International Court of Justice and the Permanent Court of Arbitration in The Hague.
- Political: The United Nations General Assembly, the United Nations Security Council, and the European Parliament.
- Executive: The European Commission functions as a collegial executive.
- Bound Collegiality: Members of the Council of the European Union are bound by instructions from their home governments.

== Legal definitions ==
=== United States ===
In the United States, definitions of collegial bodies often appear in the context of administrative law and ethics regulations. For example, Florida statute defines a collegial body as "a governmental entity marked by power or authority vested equally in each of a number of colleagues." This definition is frequently applied in anti-nepotism laws to prevent public officials from advocating for the hiring of relatives by the collective body they sit on.

=== German law (Kollegialorgan) ===
In German organizational law, a Kollegialorgan (collegial organ) is an organ within a legal entity or association consisting of at least two members (called Organwalter), as opposed to a single-member organ (Einzelorgan).

==== Characteristics ====
Collegial organs are plural organizational units established by legal norms with decision-making competence. They are prescribed by law, articles of association, or bylaws for organizations such as corporations, associations, authorities, states, or political parties.

- Corporate bodies: In legal persons under private or public law, examples include the executive board, Supervisory board (Aufsichtsrat), or Works council (Betriebsrat).
- State bodies: State collegial organs include Parliaments, governments (such as the Federal Cabinet or state governments), and municipal councils. While the Federal Government is a collegial organ, its character is limited by the Chancellor's power to set policy guidelines (Richtlinienkompetenz) and the departmental principle (Ressortprinzip).

==== Types ====
German legal theory classifies collegial organs by various criteria:

- Position: Direct organs derive their status from the constitution (e.g., the Bundesrat), while indirect organs derive it from a mandate.
- Function: They are distinguished by branch of government: Legislative (e.g., Bundestag), Executive (e.g., Cabinet), or Judiciary (e.g., collegiate courts).
- Bound vs. Free: Members may be free from instructions (like Bundestag members) or bound by instructions (like Bundesrat members, who vote according to the will of their state government).

==== Voting ====
Within the collegial organ, the collegial principle applies, meaning there is typically no hierarchy among members. Decisions are made by resolution, usually requiring a simple majority of votes cast, subject to a quorum.

==== Liability (Organhaftung) ====
Under Section 31 of the German Civil Code (BGB), a legal entity is liable for damages caused by a member of its board or other constitutionally appointed representatives in the execution of their duties.

However, members (Organwalter) face personal liability in specific cases:

- Tortious liability: Members are personally liable for intentional immoral damage to third parties (Section 826 BGB) or active tortious acts (Section 823 BGB) if the entity cannot pay (e.g., due to insolvency). For example, in 2004 the Federal Court of Justice ruled that board members of Infomatec were liable for damages after deceiving shareholders with false ad-hoc announcements.
- Internal liability: Board members are generally exempt from liability if they acted without breach of duty (Section 93 Stock Corporation Act). This applies if they reasonably believed they were acting in the company's best interest based on adequate information (the Business judgment rule).
- Criminal liability: Criminal responsibility is transferred to the individual acting as the organ (Section 14 Criminal Code), making members personally liable for crimes committed in their capacity as leaders.

=== Spain ===
In Spain, a collegial body (órgano colegiado) is an institution within the public administration composed of a plurality of natural persons or representatives who deliberate and make decisions democratically, expressing a unified will regarding a public interest. Examples include the Council of Ministers, legislative assemblies, selection tribunals, and the Council of State.

==== Administration ====
Collegial bodies in the Spanish public sector are regulated primarily by Law 40/2015 on the Legal Regime of the Public Sector. Creation of such bodies must be published in the relevant official gazette. Key roles include:

- President: Holds the office of representation.
- Secretary: Ensures legal compliance and proper procedure; may be a member or a civil servant.

==== Operations ====
- Sessions: Must be scheduled with advance notice sent to all members, preferably electronically. Unplanned sessions are valid only if all members are present and agree to hold the session.
- Quorum: Valid constitution requires the presence of the president, the secretary, and at least half of the members.
- Agendas: Only items listed on the agenda may be discussed, unless all members are present and a majority votes to declare the matter urgent.

==== Voting and liability ====
Agreements are adopted by a majority of votes of the attendees. Members who vote against a decision or abstain are exempt from any liability resulting from that agreement. However, members are generally prohibited from judicially challenging the administrative acts of the collegial body to which they belong, even if they voted against the measure.

== See also ==
- Collective leadership
- Corporate governance
- Adhocracy
- Separation of powers

== Sources ==
- Altman, David (2020). "Checking Executive Personalism: Collegial Governments and the Level of Democracy". Swiss Political Science Review. 26 (3): 316–338. doi:10.1111/spsr.12406.
- Federal Court of Justice, II ZR 218/03 (Federal Court of Justice 2004-07-19).
- "Introducción - Consejo de Estado". transparencia.consejo-estado.es (in Spanish). Consejo de Estado.
- Ellenberger, Jürgen (2014). "§ 31 Rn. 3, 6". In Otto Palandt (ed.). Kommentar BGB [Commentary on the German Civil Code] (in German) (73rd ed.). Munich: C.H. Beck.
- Holtmann, Everhard (2000). Politik-Lexikon [Political Encyclopedia] (in German). Munich: Oldenbourg. pp. 80, 293. ISBN 978-3486249064.
- Nepotism Policy of Miami-Dade County (PDF) (Report). Miami-Dade County Human Resources Department. 2023-01-09.
- Noble, Trevor; Pym, Bridget (1970). "Collegial Authority and the Receding Locus of Power". The British Journal of Sociology. 21 (4). Wiley: 431–445. doi:10.2307/588498. JSTOR 588498 – via JSTOR.
- Remus, Rolf (1969). Kommission und Rat im Willensbildungsprozess der EWG [Commission and Council in the Decision-Making Process of the EEC] (in German). Meisenheim am Glan. p. 47.
- Schmitt, Stefan Martin (2007). Organhaftung und D & O-Versicherung [Executive Liability and D&O Insurance] (in German). Karlsruhe: Verlag Versicherungswirtschaft. pp. 20, 23. ISBN 9783831606740.
- "Ley 50/1997, de 27 de noviembre, del Gobierno" [Law 50/1997, of 27 November, of the Government]. Boletín Oficial del Estado (in Spanish) (285). 1997-11-27.
- "Ley 29/1998, de 13 de julio, reguladora de la Jurisdicción Contencioso-administrativa" [Law 29/1998, of 13 July, regulating the Contentious-Administrative Jurisdiction]. Boletín Oficial del Estado (in Spanish) (167). 1998-07-13.
- "Ley 40/2015, de 1 de octubre, de Régimen Jurídico del Sector Público" [Law 40/2015, of 1 October, on the Legal Regime of the Public Sector]. Boletín Oficial del Estado (in Spanish) (236). 2015-10-02.
- Thiele, Carmen (2008). Regeln und Verfahren der Entscheidungsfindung innerhalb von Staaten und Staatenverbindungen [Rules and Procedures of Decision-Making within States and Associations of States] (in German). Berlin: Springer. pp. 142–143, 148, 151, 599. ISBN 978-3540789949.
- Waters, Malcolm (1989). "Collegiality, Bureaucratization, and Professionalization: A Weberian Analysis". American Journal of Sociology. 94 (5). University of Chicago Press: 945–972. doi:10.1086/229109. JSTOR 2780464.
- Weber, Max (1947) [1922]. "The Types of Authority and Imperative Co-ordination". In Parsons, Talcott (ed.). The Theory of Social and Economic Organization. Translated by Henderson, A. M. Glencoe, Illinois: The Free Press.
