= Vertical integration =

When a company owns its supply chain

A diagram illustrating horizontal integration and contrasting it with vertical integration

In microeconomics, management and international political economy, vertical integration, also referred to as vertical consolidation, is an arrangement in which the supply chain of a company is integrated and owned by that company. Usually each member of the supply chain produces a different product or (market-specific) service, and the products combine to satisfy a common need. It contrasts with horizontal integration, wherein a company produces several items that are related to one another. Vertical integration has also described management styles that bring large portions of the supply chain not only under a common ownership but also into one corporation (as in the 1920s when the Ford River Rouge complex began making much of its own steel rather than buying it from suppliers).

Vertical integration can be desirable because it secures supplies needed by the firm to produce its product and the market needed to sell the product, but it can become undesirable when a firm's actions become anti-competitive and impede free competition in an open marketplace. Vertical integration is one method of avoiding the hold-up problem. A monopoly produced through vertical integration is called a vertical monopoly: vertical in a supply chain measures a firm's distance from the final consumers; for example, a firm that sells directly to the consumers has a vertical position of 0, a firm that supplies to this firm has a vertical position of 1, and so on.

== Measurement ==
The vertical integration of a company can be measured using the Real net output ratio:

$0 < \text{Real net output ratio} = \frac{\text{Added Value}}{\text{Total Production Value}} < 1$

Added value is the difference between a company's turnover and externally purchased services, such as profit, gross wages, or other non-wage labour costs.

In essence, the less a company outsources, the higher the degree of vertical integration - or the degree of integration tends towards one, representing a high degree of vertical integration.

This also means that the lower the vertical integration - the higher the proportion of purchased components and services - the lower the real net output ratio, as this reduces value creation.

== Vertical expansion ==
Vertical integration is often closely associated with vertical expansion which, in economics, is the growth of a business enterprise through the acquisition of companies that produce the intermediate goods needed by the business or help market and distribute its product. A firm may desire such expansion to secure the supplies needed by the firm to produce its product and the market needed to sell the product. Such expansion can become undesirable from a system-wide perspective when it becomes anti-competitive and impede free competition in an open marketplace.

The result is a more efficient business with lower costs and more profits. On the undesirable side, when vertical expansion leads toward monopolistic control of a product or service then regulative action may be required to rectify anti-competitive behavior. Related to vertical expansion is lateral expansion, which is the growth of a business enterprise through the acquisition of similar firms, in the hope of achieving economies of scale.

Vertical expansion is also known as a vertical acquisition. Vertical expansion or acquisitions can also be used to increase sales and to gain market power. The acquisition of DirecTV by News Corporation is an example of forwarding vertical expansion or acquisition. DirecTV is a satellite TV company through which News Corporation can distribute more of its media content: news, movies, and television shows. The acquisition of NBC by Comcast is an example of backward vertical integration. For example, in the United States, protecting the public from communications monopolies that can be built in this way is one of the missions of the Federal Communications Commission.

Scholars' findings suggest that a reduction in inefficiencies caused by the market vertical value chains, including downstream prices or double mark-up, can be negated with vertical integration. Application in more complex environments can help firms overcome market failures (markets with high transaction costs or assets specificities). Scholars also identified potential risks and boundaries which may occur under vertical integration. This includes the potential competitor, the enhancements to horizontal collusion, and development of barriers to entry. However, it is still debated over if vertical integration expected efficiencies can lead to competitive harm to the market. Some conclude that in many cases that the efficiencies outweigh the potential risks.

== Three types of vertical integration ==
Contrary to horizontal integration, which is a consolidation of many firms that handle the same part of the production process, vertical integration is typified by one firm engaged in different parts of production (e.g., growing raw materials, manufacturing, transporting, marketing, and/or retailing). Vertical integration is the degree to which a firm owns its upstream suppliers and its downstream buyers. The differences depend on where the firm is placed in the order of the supply chain. There are three varieties of vertical integration: backward (upstream) vertical integration, forward (downstream) vertical integration, and balanced (both upstream and downstream) vertical integration.

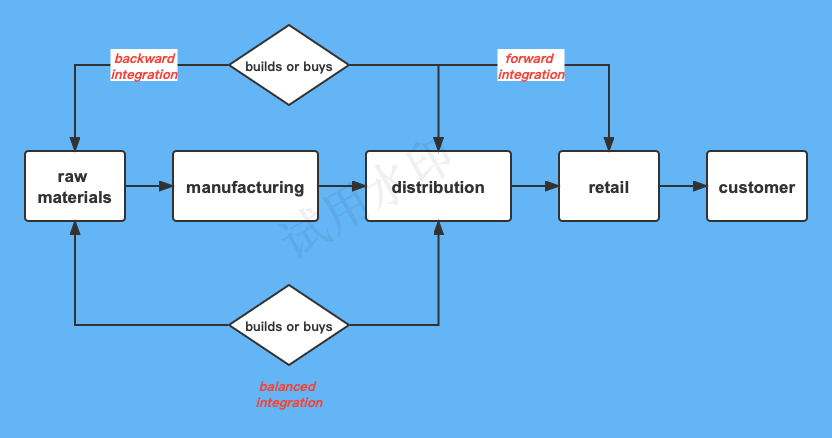
Distinguish between backward integration, forward integration and balanced integration

- Backward vertical integration: A company exhibits backward vertical integration when it controls subsidiaries that produce some of the inputs used in the production of its products. For example, an automobile company may own a tire company, a glass company, and a metal company. Control of these three subsidiaries is intended to create a stable supply of inputs and ensure consistent quality in their final product. It was the main business approach of Ford and other car companies in the 1920s, who sought to use curated designs by Ford engineers, while minimizing costs by integrating the production of cars and car parts, as exemplified in the Ford River Rouge Complex. This type of integration also makes the barriers to entry into an industry more difficult. The control of subsidiaries that produce the raw materials needed in the production process gives a company the power to refuse access to resources to competitors and new entrants. They have the ability to cut off the chain of supply for competing buyers and thus, strengthen their position in their respective industry.
- Forward vertical integration: A company tends toward forward vertical integration when it controls distribution centers and retailers where its products are sold. An example is a brewing company that owns and controls a number of bars or pubs. Unlike backward vertical integration, which serves to reduce costs of production, forward vertical integration allows a company to decrease its costs of distribution. This includes avoiding paying taxes for exchanges between stages in the chain of production, bypassing other price regulations, and removing the need for intermediary markets. In addition, a company has the power to refuse to support sales of competing distribution centers and retailers. Similar to backward vertical integration, this ability increases the barriers to entry into an industry.
- Balanced vertical integration: A company demonstrates balanced vertical integration when it practices both backward vertical integration and forward vertical integration. Accomplishing this gives a company authority over the entire production and distribution process of a given product. A product that is produced in an integrated company as such exemplifies the result of a cost-efficient manufacture

Disintermediation is a form of vertical integration when purchasing departments take over the former role of wholesalers to source products.

For vertical integration to succeed, managers must be able to adapt their managerial approach to compliment the changes in functional activities that their vertical shift accompanies. Managers should make sure that their firm can take advantage of existing functional knowledge through organisation, and simultaneously allow new functional knowledge to develop. However, environmental possibilities can be a factor in determining whether vertical integration is successful.

== Influence factors of vertical integration ==
- Technology : the probability of vertical integration between the two industries is less likely when the supply industry is more technology-intensive and the production industry is less technology-intensive. In addition, the impact of these factors is greater when inputs from the supply industry represent a large proportion of the total costs incurred by the production industry.
- Switching cost and product differentiation : based on a new insight that pricing incentive choice of a downstream producer may change by vertical integration, downstream firms are more likely to switch to a different supplier if the investment by firms in a particular relationship is low, or if the input market is similar to the spot market. In this case, vertical M&A is more likely to have a positive impact on consumers. However, if supplier switching costs are high, the impact of a vertical integration on consumers depends on the degree of downstream product differentiation. If the downstream product is significantly differentiated, vertical integration is more likely beneficial to consumers. In contrast, if the downstream products are close substitutes, vertical integration is likely to harm consumers.

== Problems and benefits ==
There are many problems and benefits that vertical integration brings to an economic system. Problems that can stem from vertical integration can include large capital investments needed to set up and buy factories and maintain efficient profits. Rapid technology development can increase integration difficulties and further increase costs. The requirement of different business skills venturing into new portions of the supply chain can be challenging for the firm. Another problem that may stem from vertical integration is the collapse of goals among the various firms in a supply chain. With each firm operating under different systems, integration may cause initial problems in management and production. Vertical integration also proves to be dangerous when monopolistic problems arise in a capitalistic economy. When this happens, competition is removed and a corporation has the power to control all firms in its supply chain.

Large companies are more likely than smaller companies to employ vertical integration, as they have more resources to manage each stage of production (e.g. major expansion and funding). Vertical integration allows control of production from beginning to end. Vertical integration requires a company to focus not only on its core business, but also on several difficult areas such as sourcing materials and manufacturing partners, distribution, and finally selling the product.

One benefit is that the implementation of vertical integration can yield increased profit margins or eliminate the leverage that other firms or buyers may have over the firm. It allows improved coordination between production and distribution firms and decreases the cost of exchange of goods between firms within a supply chain. Operational routines also become more consistent and certain as the management of these firms gradually merge. Vertically integrated firms rarely need to worry about the sufficiency in their supply of materials because they generally control the facilities that provide them. A vertically integrated company also creates high barriers of entry into their respective economy, eliminating most potential competition. Implementing vertical integration can be beneficial in that it reduces the distance that separates the suppliers and customers from the resources or information, which can then boost profits and efficiency.

There are internal and external society-wide gains and losses stemming from vertical integration, which vary according to the state of technology in the industries involved, roughly corresponding to the stages of the industry lifecycle. Static technology represents the simplest case, where the gains and losses have been studied extensively. A vertically integrated company usually fails when transactions within the market are too risky or the contracts to support these risks are too costly to administer, such as frequent transactions and a small number of buyers and sellers.

=== Internal gains ===
- Lower transaction costs
- Synchronization of supply and demand along the chain of products
- Lower uncertainty and higher investment
- Capture of profit margins from upstream or downstream
- Ability to monopolize market throughout the chain by market foreclosure
- Strategic independence (especially if important inputs are rare or highly volatile in price, such as rare-earth metals).
- Enhancing the company's ties with its suppliers
- Lower the threshold for entry. A sustained high surplus phase must be protected by barriers to entry. As a result, a vertically integrated entrant is able to extend these barriers at a lower cost than the value of existing surpluses.

=== Internal losses ===
- Higher monetary and organizational costs of switching to other suppliers/buyers
- Weaker motivation for good performance at the start of the supply chain since sales are guaranteed and poor quality may be blended into other inputs at later manufacturing stages
- Specific investment, capacity balancing issue
- Developing new business competencies can compromise on existing competencies
- Conflicts in inventory management post-integration
- Demand uncertainty may increase due to inventory instability
- Assigning limited purchasing resources among the suppliers as well as the production of goods or services

=== Benefits to society ===
- Better opportunities for investment growth through reduced uncertainty
- Local companies are often better positioned against foreign competition
- Lower consumer prices by reducing markup from intermediaries
- Accomplishing the maximum profits for selling products or services.

=== Losses to society ===
- Monopolization of markets
- Potential for vertical foreclosure
- Rigid organizational structure
- Manipulation of prices (if market power is established)
- Loss of tax revenue in the case of sales taxes.

== Vertical integration in Germany ==
Among German economists, vertical integration is typically measured on the level of individual businesses and companies, rather than via merged corporations or subsidiary businesses. The real net output ratio, or Fertigungstiefe, is commonly used to measure the contributions of an individual company to the value chain of a product. The term, and its subsequent global impact on vertical integration, was first popularized outside Germany in Hermann Simon's 1996 publication on Hidden champions, Hidden champions: lessons from 500 of the world's best unknown companies:

Many extremely successful companies escape the attention of those whose business it is to know everything (media), understand everything (scientists) or improve everything (consultants). This is the sphere of the world's best midsize companies, the world of the 'hidden champions.'

Germany's strong tradition of industrial manufacturing and its focus on engineering excellence has resulted in it favoring vertical integration as a means to maintain control over production, particularly processes and quality. Common cultural attributes of Germany, including its high focus on tertiary education, inter-firm relationships, and knowledge sharing among industries, have resulted in the consistent development of vertically integrated businesses. In contrast to the United States, German businesses typically approach vertical integration via the expansion of the existing business, rather than merging with or acquiring suppliers or distributors.

On a national level, real net output ratio is sometimes used to the level of vertical integration within a country, or determine the share of domestic value added to products imported from abroad. While commonly used in Germany, researchers have applied it to other nations, such as Taiwan.

=== Historical and current examples ===
Prior to World War I, German manufacturing, such as cotton and textiles, had a relatively high degree of vertical integration. Post World War II, the US State Department noted Germany's advocacy for integration of its coal and steel production under the Schumann Plan.

At the time of Simon's 1996 publication, Germany was the number one exporter globally, and remains the third largest exporter of goods as of 2023, at $2,104,251 million per year. Industry 4.0 initiatives and trade flows are expected to further increase the level of vertical integration within small-to-medium businesses.

Automotive manufacturers such as Volkswagen remain committed to vertical integration as they work to transition towards electric vehicle manufacture, including developing their own battery-manufacturing sites and securing access to raw material. Likewise, Rohde & Schwarz recommitted to their high level of vertical integration in 2022, in the wake of the COVID-19 pandemic.

Germany's vertical integration of its electrical markets have been a known issue since 2005. In 2021, the European Court determined that German concepts of vertical integration, specifically related to the production/supply and transmission/distribution/storage of electricity and natural gas, were too narrow and did not follow the requirements of the EU Electricity Directive and the EU Natural Gas Directive.

== Vertical integration in America ==
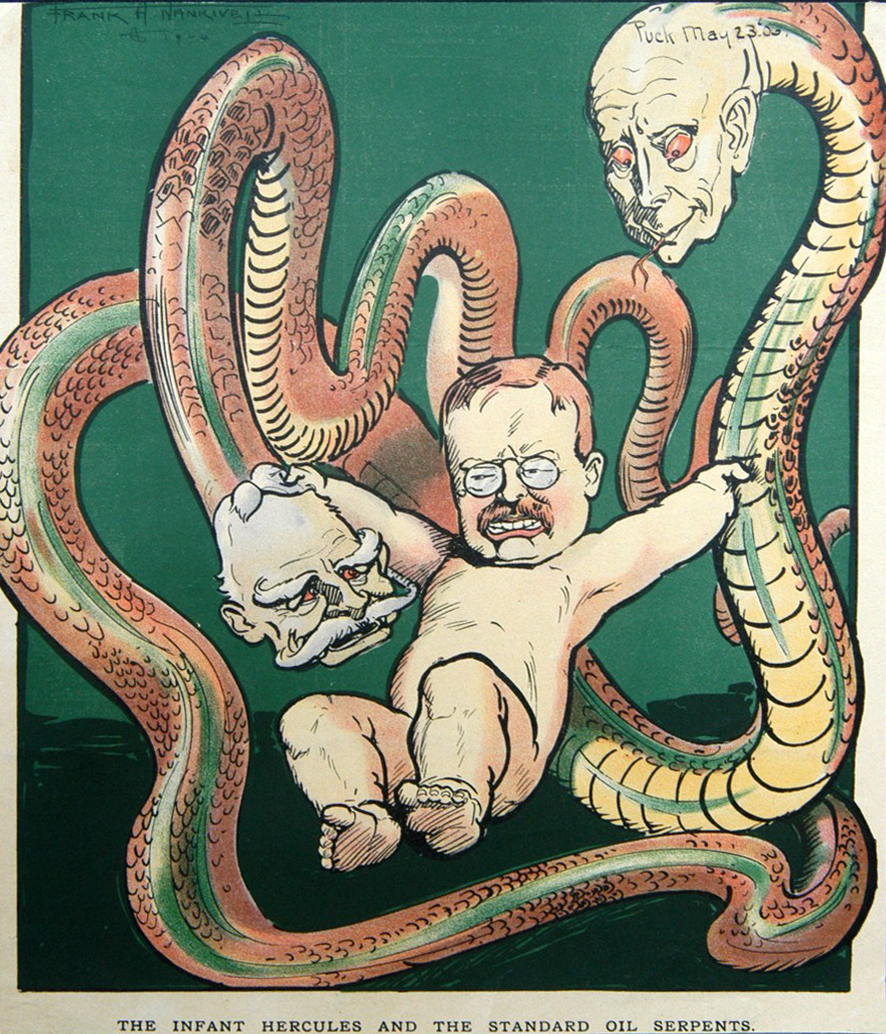
U.S. President Theodore Roosevelt depicted as the infant Hercules grappling with Standard Oil Company in a 1906 Puck magazine cartoon by Frank A. Nankivell

Many major companies such as General Foods, Carnegie Steel Company, the Bell System, Apple, the U.S. entertainment studios, the U.S. meat industry, Ford Motor Company, CVS, and Amazon demonstrate vertical merging. Notably, the successful vertical integration of Standard Oil Company contributed to significant developments in US antitrust law in 1890, significantly limiting the vertical expansion of businesses.

=== Food ===
In 1924, Clarence Birdseye patented the "Birdseye Plate Froster" and established the General Seafood Corporation. Members of the supply chain, such as farmers and small food retailers, could not afford the high cost of equipment, so Birdseye provided it to them. In 1929, Birdseye's company and the patent were bought by Postum Cereals and Goldman Sachs Trading Corporation. It was later known as General Foods. They kept the Birdseye name, which was split into two words (Birds eye) for use as a trademark. Birdseye was paid $20 million for the patents and $2 million for the assets.

Birds Eye has since seen the downsides of vertical integration, with fixed costs associated with vertical integration, such as property, plants, and equipment that cannot be reduced significantly when production needs decrease, and a larger organizational structure that cannot react quickly to market changes.

=== Big tech ===
Big Tech companies such as Alphabet and Amazon have been noted as examples of both vertically and horizontally integrated companies.

=== Steel and oil ===
Carnegie Steel is an example of America's initial approach to vertical integration, with the business controlling not only the mills where steel was manufactured, but mines where coal and iron ore was extracted, shipping of the raw materials, the coke ovens where the coal was coked, and so on. By using vertical integration, Andrew Carnegie created the largest steel company in the world. The company focused heavily on developing talent internally from the bottom up, rather than importing it from other companies. Later, Carnegie established an institute of higher learning to teach the steel processes to the next generation.

National oil companies (e.g., Petronas), often adopt a vertically integrated structure, meaning that they are active along the entire supply chain from locating deposits, drilling and extracting crude oil, transporting it around the world, refining it into petroleum products such as petrol/gasoline, and distributing the fuel to company-owned retail stations, for sale to consumers. Standard Oil combined extraction, transport, refinement, wholesale distribution, and retail sales at company-owned gas stations, with its vertical integration of the petroleum market bordering on monopoly. In 1890, Standard Oil controlled 88 percent of the refined oil flows in the United States. Consequently, the US Congress passed the Sherman Antitrust Act in 1890, which was enforced in Standard Oil Co. of New Jersey v. United States.

=== Telecommunications and computing ===
Telephone companies in most of the 20th century, especially the largest (the Bell System), were integrated, making their own telephones, telephone cables, telephone exchange equipment and other supplies. The Bell System is an example of an industry in which without vertical integration, would not be able to develop efficiently. In order to implement a telecommunications system that connected cities across a nation reliably, vertical integration was called upon. This strategic move ensured that the wiring, manufacture, and management of the system was consistent and functional across a state.

=== Apple ===
Apple has used the vertical integration strategy since 1980, with a business strategy focused on its own development of integrated hardware, software, and latterly services. This includes integrating their software (through APIs for third-party application developers) with their own hardware, along with the forward integration with their retail stores, allowing them to sell their products directly to customers and control the prices of their own markets. Apple is distinct in that it is known as an orchestrator (economics), exerting control over the entire value chain, without manufacturing everything directly, such as the assembly of iPhones by its manufacturing partner Foxconn.

=== Entertainment ===
From the early 1920s through the early 1950s, the American motion picture had evolved into an industry controlled by a few companies, a condition known as a "mature oligopoly", as it was led by eight major film studios, the most powerful of which were the "Big Five" studios: MGM, Warner Brothers, 20th Century Fox, Paramount Pictures, and RKO. These studios were fully integrated, not only producing and distributing films, but also operating their own movie theaters; the "Little Three", Universal Studios, Columbia Pictures, and United Artists, produced and distributed feature films but did not own theaters.

The issue of vertical integration (also known as common ownership) has been the main focus of policy makers because of the possibility of anti-competitive behaviors affiliated with market influence. For example, in United States v. Paramount Pictures, Inc., the Supreme Court ordered the five vertically integrated studios to sell off their theater chains and all trade practices were prohibited (United States v. Paramount Pictures, Inc., 1948). The prevalence of vertical integration wholly predetermined the relationships between both studios and networks and modified criteria in financing. Networks began arranging content initiated by commonly owned studios and stipulated a portion of the syndication revenues in order for a show to gain a spot on the schedule if it was produced by a studio without common ownership. In response, the studios fundamentally changed the way they made movies and did business. Lacking the financial resources and contract talent they once controlled, the studios now relied on independent producers supplying some portion of the budget in exchange for distribution rights.

Certain media conglomerates may, in a similar manner, own television broadcasters (either over-the-air or on cable), production companies that produce content for their networks, and also own the services that distribute their content to viewers (such as television and internet service providers). AT&T, Bell Canada, Comcast, Sky plc, and Rogers Communications are vertically integrated in such a manner—operating media subsidiaries (such as WarnerMedia, Bell Media, NBCUniversal, and Rogers Media), and provide "triple play" services of television, internet, and phone service in some markets (such as Bell Satellite TV/Bell Internet, Rogers Cable, Xfinity, and Sky's satellite TV and internet services). Additionally, Bell and Rogers own wireless providers, Bell Mobility and Rogers Wireless, while Comcast is partnered with Verizon Wireless for an Xfinity-branded MVNO. Similarly, Sony has media holdings through its Sony Pictures division, including film and television content, as well as television channels, but is also a manufacturer of consumer electronics that can be used to play content from itself and others, including televisions, phones, and PlayStation video game consoles. AT&T is the first ever vertical integration where a mobile phone company and a film studio company are under same umbrella.

=== Agriculture ===
Vertical integration through production and marketing contracts have also become the dominant model for livestock production. Currently, 90% of poultry, 69% of hogs, and 29% of cattle are contractually produced through vertical integration. The USDA supports vertical integration because it has increased food productivity. However, "... contractors receive a large share of farm receipts, formerly assumed to go to the operator's family".

Under production contracts, growers raise animals owned by integrators. Farm contracts contain detailed conditions for growers, who are paid based on how efficiently they use feed, provided by the integrator, to raise the animals. The contract dictates how to construct the facilities, how to feed, house, and medicate the animals, and how to handle manure and dispose of carcasses. Generally, the contract also shields the integrator from liability. Jim Hightower, in his book, Eat Your Heart Out, discusses this liability role enacted by large food companies. He finds that in many cases of agricultural vertical integration, the integrator (food company) denies the farmer the right of entrepreneurship. This means that the farmer can only sell under and to the integrator. These restrictions on specified growth, Hightower argues, strips the selling and producing power of the farmer. The producer is ultimately limited by the established standards of the integrator. Yet, at the same time, the integrator still keeps the responsibility connected to the farmer. Hightower sees this as ownership without reliability.

Under marketing contracts, growers agree in advance to sell their animals to integrators under an agreed price system. Generally, these contracts shield the integrator from liability for the grower's actions and the only negotiable item is a price.

=== Health care ===
Within healthcare systems, horizontal integration is generally much more prominent. However, in the United States, major vertical mergers have included CVS Health's purchase of Aetna, and Cigna's purchase of Express Scripts. The integration of CVS Health and Aetna resulted in the combination of one of the nation's largest health insurance companies with a pharmaceutical company seen all across the U.S.

=== Electric utilities ===
Before a wave of deregulation at the end of 20th century, most electric utilities were vertically integrated and provided electric generation, transmission, distribution, and sales. These were not just conglomerates with a common accounting department: there was just one profit center in sales, and costs of transmission and distribution were not separated. Partial deregulation in the US in 1978 (PURPA) forced the utilities to buy electricity outside if the rates were competitive; this gave rise to independent power producers. The other deviation from the vertical integration model were local distribution companies in some towns and regions. In the US 250 vertically integrated companies provided 85% of electrical generation. As of 2022, this "public utility" model was still utilized in some US states, mostly in the Mountain West, Great Plains, and Southeast.

== Vertical integration in China ==
Baidu and Alibaba have been noted as examples of both vertically and horizontally integrated companies.

In order to increase profits and gain more market share, Alibaba, has implemented vertical integration deepening its company holdings to more than the e-commerce platform. Alibaba has built its leadership in the market by gradually acquiring complementary companies in a variety of industries including delivery and payments. For example, Alibaba is the owner of logistics operator Cainiao, which handles warehousing and last-mile delivery for products sold through Alibaba's platforms. It also operates Alipay, a payment platform for its merchants.

== Vertical integration in France ==
EssilorLuxottica, the company that merged with Essilor and Luxottica, occupies up to 30% of the global market share as well as representing billions of pairs of lenses and frames sold annually. Before the merger, Luxottica also owned 80% of the market share of companies that produce corrective and protective eyewear as well as owning many retailers, optical departments at Target and Sears, and key eye insurance groups, such as EyeMed, many of which are already part of the now merged company.

== Economic theory ==
In economic theory, vertical integration has been studied in the literature on incomplete contracts that was developed by Oliver Hart and his coauthors. Hart's theory has been extended by several authors. For instance, DeMeza and Lockwood (1998) have studied different bargaining games, while Schmitz (2006) has introduced asymmetric information into the incomplete contracting setup. In these extended models, vertical integration can sometimes be optimal even if only the seller has to make an investment decision.

German economics commonly refers to the real net output ratio to monitor the fraction of the value chain influenced by the business' vertical integration.

== See also ==
- Tapered integration
- Vertical and horizontal market
