= Schwank (disambiguation) =

Schwank is a German surname.

Schwank may also refer to:

- 21738 Schwank, a main-belt asteroid
- Schwank (comedy), short satirical tale, verse or play, in German literature
- Schwank, fictional character in 1887 burlesque Frankenstein, or The Vampire's Victim
- Schwank (company), German manufacturer of heaters
