= NELP =

NELP may refer to:

- New England Literature Program, an academic program run by the University of Michigan
- New Exploration Licensing Policy, the current oil exploration policy in India
- North East London Polytechnic, currently the University of East London (UEL), in the United Kingdom
