= Hidden champions =

Nickname for less known but highly successful companies

Hidden champions are relatively small but highly successful companies that excel in their niche but are not well-known to the general public. The term was coined by Hermann Simon. He first used the term in 1990 as a title of a publication in a scientific German management journal, describing the small, highly specialized world-market leaders in Germany. According to his definition, a company must meet three criteria to be considered a hidden champion:

- Number one, two, or three in the global market, or number one on the company's continent, determined by market share
- Revenue below $5 billion
- Low level of public awareness

== Discovering hidden champions ==
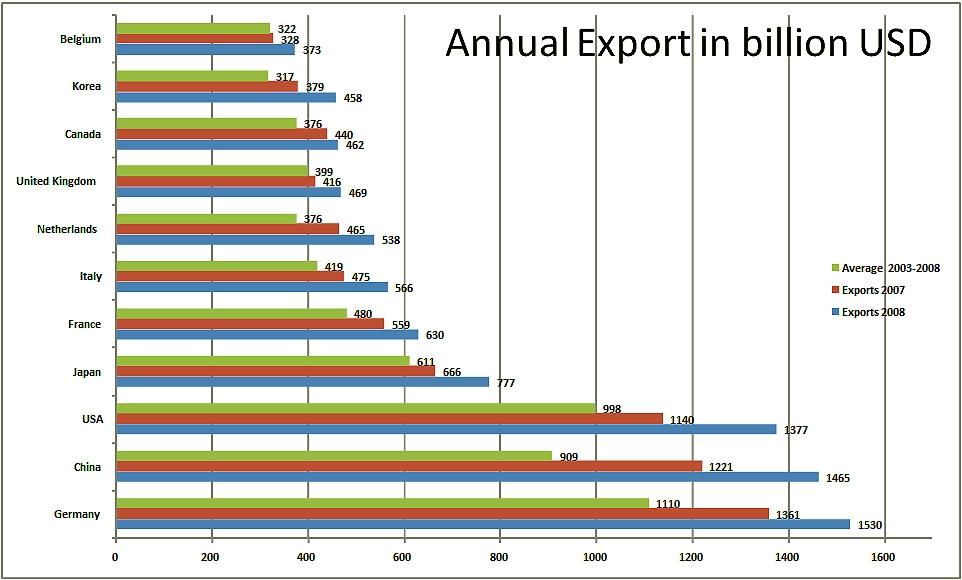
Annual exports by different countries (2003–2008)

The first English book about the subject was Hermann Simon's Hidden champions: lessons from 500 of the world's best unknown companies. The book explores how Germany was able to consistently be (at the time) the number one exporter in the world. While Germany has global corporations like Volkswagen, Siemens, BASF and Bosch, these organisations are not substantially different from organisations like Ford, GE, DuPont or Visteon. Simon postulates that Germany's strong exports are supported by a large number of midsize firms. These smaller companies are normally known only in their market by their customers and suppliers, and are relatively unknown to the wider public. When these companies are very successful on the international markets they are hidden champions.

Simon conducted detailed research on 500 such companies and established a framework to describe them. The framework was also able to identify the main differences and traits common to hidden champions. With this framework in hand it was found that there are hidden champions everywhere around the world, but they are most frequently found in German-speaking countries.

The idea and adaptation of hidden champions was implemented in a fund called Hidden Champions Fund, founded in Singapore by 8I Holdings Ltd.

== Success factors ==
Many hidden champions produce inconspicuous, highly specialized products, often holding a leading position in their respective global markets. These companies are frequently, though not exclusively, family-owned. They tend to export a significant share of their products, thereby contributing to the current account surpluses of their home countries, and generally demonstrate above-average business performance.

The idea of market leadership means more than counting market share. Leaders as employees need an "inner flame" to become, and to remain, the number one. Hidden champions normally work in niche markets. For these markets they design unique products, which are produced with a high real net output ratio. They have to accept the risk of being a single product manufacturer. They divide between "good" and "bad" market share. The good is earned by performance and a solid foundation, the bad from price aggression and discounting.

One result of working with unique products in niche markets is quite often the need to deal on the global market in order to achieve economies of scale. For this reason, hidden champions feel a strong need to work abroad early in their company's development. Hidden champions also operate extremely close to their customers, and their customers' needs are an important driver for their innovations. On the other hand, customers of hidden champions depend on their products and they cannot easily change their source. This often makes for a high level of co-dependence between the producer and the customer, a result of the one product risk.

A lot of the hidden champions established their main product as an innovation and were able to keep this single position in the market, or were at least able to keep a leading position. Their markets are mostly oligopolistic with intense competition.

Competitive advantages of hidden champions are rarely because of cost leadership, more because of quality, total cost of ownership, high performance, and consultation close to the customer. They "earn" their market leadership through performance and not through price aggression. Their high real net output ratio is often achieved by working with proprietary processes which make it hard for competitors to imitate their products. On the other hand, management tasks like finance are often outsourced.

It also seems to be evident that to maintain market leadership hidden champions do business on their own, rather than depend on working in cooperation with others. Even sales in countries abroad are often organized from the parent company base. This keeps significant know-how inside, and helps recruit highly qualified staff at a small company.

The corporate culture of hidden champions is distinctive. Their values are conservative: hard work, strict selection, intolerance of underperformance, low sickness rates and high employee loyalty –and most are based in smaller towns.

Leadership style is authoritarian on strategic issues but participative on operations level. The leaders identify themselves with the company, are focused on their products, and stay for a long time, much longer than is normal in large public corporations.

A serious problem for hidden champions, as it is for SMEs in general, is to attract international professionals. Hidden champions need people who are happy to live in a remote location, who are attracted by job content, and who do not care much for a formal and prescribed career path. In Germany the concept of hidden champion is known to some extent, and therefore hidden champions there are able to utilise this label to recruit staff. In 2011, the first "Hidden Champions Day" was organized by the student initiative bdvb e.V. at the University of Mannheim in order to promote the advantages and opportunities of working for a SME.

== International reception and academic research ==
Since its introduction by Hermann Simon in the early 1990s, the hidden champions concept has attracted international attention in management research, business education, and economic policymaking. Initially developed to explain the success of relatively unknown German world-market leaders, the concept has subsequently been applied to specialized companies in different countries and economic environments. Simon's books on hidden champions have been translated into numerous languages, contributing to the international dissemination of the concept.

Research on hidden champions has developed into a distinct field of inquiry within entrepreneurship, strategic management, and small and medium-sized enterprise research. In 2022, Julian Schenkenhofer published a comprehensive literature review in Management Review Quarterly, examining 112 publications and identifying four research streams, particularly internationalization, innovation, and the geographical distribution of hidden champions. A subsequent bibliometric study by Stephan Gerschewski, João J. Ferreira, Ana Joana Candeias Fernandes, and Jong Min Lee, published in Small Business Economics in 2026, analyzed 71 peer-reviewed journal articles. The study identified Schenkenhofer as both the most prolific author, with nine publications, and the most-cited academic hidden champion researcher worldwide. It also identified a prominent collaborative research network involving Schenkenhofer, Erik E. Lehmann, David B. Audretsch, and other scholars. Research findings have additionally entered management education through case-study collections, including those edited by Jan-Philipp Büchler, which examine the strategies and management practices of hidden champions.

The concept has also gained institutional recognition outside Europe, particularly in China. Zhejiang University established the International Research Center for Hidden Champions in 2021, directed by Xiaobo Wu, with Linan Lei serving as deputy director and Hermann Simon as honorary director. In Shouguang, the Hermann Simon Business School was established to provide management education focused on specialized, internationally competitive enterprises. The school has also cooperated with Beijing Normal University in offering executive training programmes on hidden champions.

International comparative research has further extended the concept beyond its original German context. The management development association CEEMAN and IEDC–Bled School of Management have coordinated research programmes examining hidden champions in Central and Eastern Europe, Asia, Africa, and Latin America. Their 2026 publication Hidden Champions in Rising Economies: The Undiscovered Roads to the Future brought together 85 researchers from 30 countries and examined 70 companies. In South Korea, management scholars Pil Hwa Yoo and Sookyoung Key have discussed the hidden champions model as an alternative international management paradigm, emphasizing specialization, globalization, innovation, and long-term competitiveness.

The concept has also influenced economic policy and industrial development initiatives. South Korea introduced support programmes explicitly aimed at developing Korean hidden champions, including its World Class 300 initiative. Japan's Ministry of Economy, Trade and Industry has recognized specialized global market leaders through its Global Niche Top Companies Selection programme. At the European Union's SME Assembly in Copenhagen in November 2025, a dedicated policy workshop examined European hidden champions as a strategic asset for global industrial competitiveness. In Copenhagen, a panel was run by Simon, Schenkenhofer and Buechler. These initiatives illustrate the application of the concept to debates about innovation, international competitiveness, and the development of specialized small and medium-sized enterprises.

== List of selected hidden champions ==
This list of companies selected by Hermann Simon in 2009 gives an idea of the specialization of hidden champions:

- 3B Scientific (anatomical teaching aids)
- ARCITECTA (data management platform)
- ARRI (cinema cameras)
- Belfor (removal of fire and water damages)
- Beluga Shipping (heavy-lift shipping company; defunct)
- Bobcat Company (farm and construction equipment)
- Brainlab (medical software and hardware)
- Corticeira Amorim (cork products)
- De La Rue (security printing, papermaking and cash handling systems)
- DELO Industrie Klebstoffe (adhesives for chip cards)
- Embraer (regional jets)
- Dickson Constant (technical textiles for blinds, truck sheeting etc.)
- Enercon (wind turbines)
- EOS GmbH (rapid prototyping systems)
- Essel Propack (tubes for toothpaste)
- Friwo Gerätebau GmbH (charging devices, power supplies, led drivers, battery packs)
- Josef Gartner GmbH (facades for skyscrapers, subsidiary of Permasteelisa)
- Gallagher Group Limited (electric fencing, livestock, weighing equipment)
- Hans Gerriets (single manufacturer of large stage curtains)
- Hamamatsu Photonics (optical sensors including photomultiplier tubes)
- Heraeus Electro-Nite (measurement, monitoring and control of molten metal processes)
- HiFi-Tuning (developing, engineering of fine fuses)
- Höganäs AB (powdered metals)
- International SOS (medical assistance, health-care, security and risk management services)
- Jamba!/Jamster (cell phone ring tones)
- Austrian Jungbunzlauer (sodium acetate)
- Klais Orgelbau (large organs)
- Swiss Lantal Textiles (cabins for passenger aircraft)
- McIlhenny Company (Tabasco sauce)
- Molex (electronic components, including electrical and fiber optic)
- NetJets (fractional ownership and rental of private business jets)
- Nissha Printing (small touch panels)
- Nivarox (regulating mechanism inside wristwatches)
- Nordischer Maschinenbau Rud. Baader (supplier of fish processing systems)
- Omicron NanoTechnology (scanning probe and tunnel-grid microscopes)
- Orica (industrial explosives)
- PERI GmbH (formwork and scaffolding)
- Petzl (climbing gear, caving gear, work-at-height equipment)
- Phoenix Contact (terminal blocks, connectors, interface solutions, industrial automation)
- PLANSEE (high performance materials)
- Q-Cells (solar energy, solar cells)
- Radiall (electronic interconnect components)
- Sachtler (tripods for movie cameras)
- SAES Getters (Getter producer)
- Sappi (coated fine paper)
- Schwank (industrial heating)
- SGS, Société Générale de Surveillance (inspection, verification, testing and certification services)
- SCHMITZ u. Söhne GmbH & Co. KG (gynecological and urological examination chairs, specializes in medical technological products)
- Tandberg and Polycom (videoconferencing systems)
- O.C. Tanner (employee recognition programs)
- Technogym (fitness equipment)
- Tetra (aquarium and pond supplies)
- ULVAC Technologies (vacuum technology)
- Universo S.A. (wristwatch hands)
- W.E.T. (car seat heating)
- Vector Informatik (software and engineering services for the networking of electronic systems in the automobile)
- Webasto (remote-controlled heaters for cars)
- Worldwide.energy (green energy)
- Zimmer Holdings, DePuy, Biomet, and Stryker Corporation (all implants, and located in the area of Warsaw, Indiana)
