= Hamamatsu Photonics =

Japanese optical device manufacturer

Hamamatsu Photonics K.K.

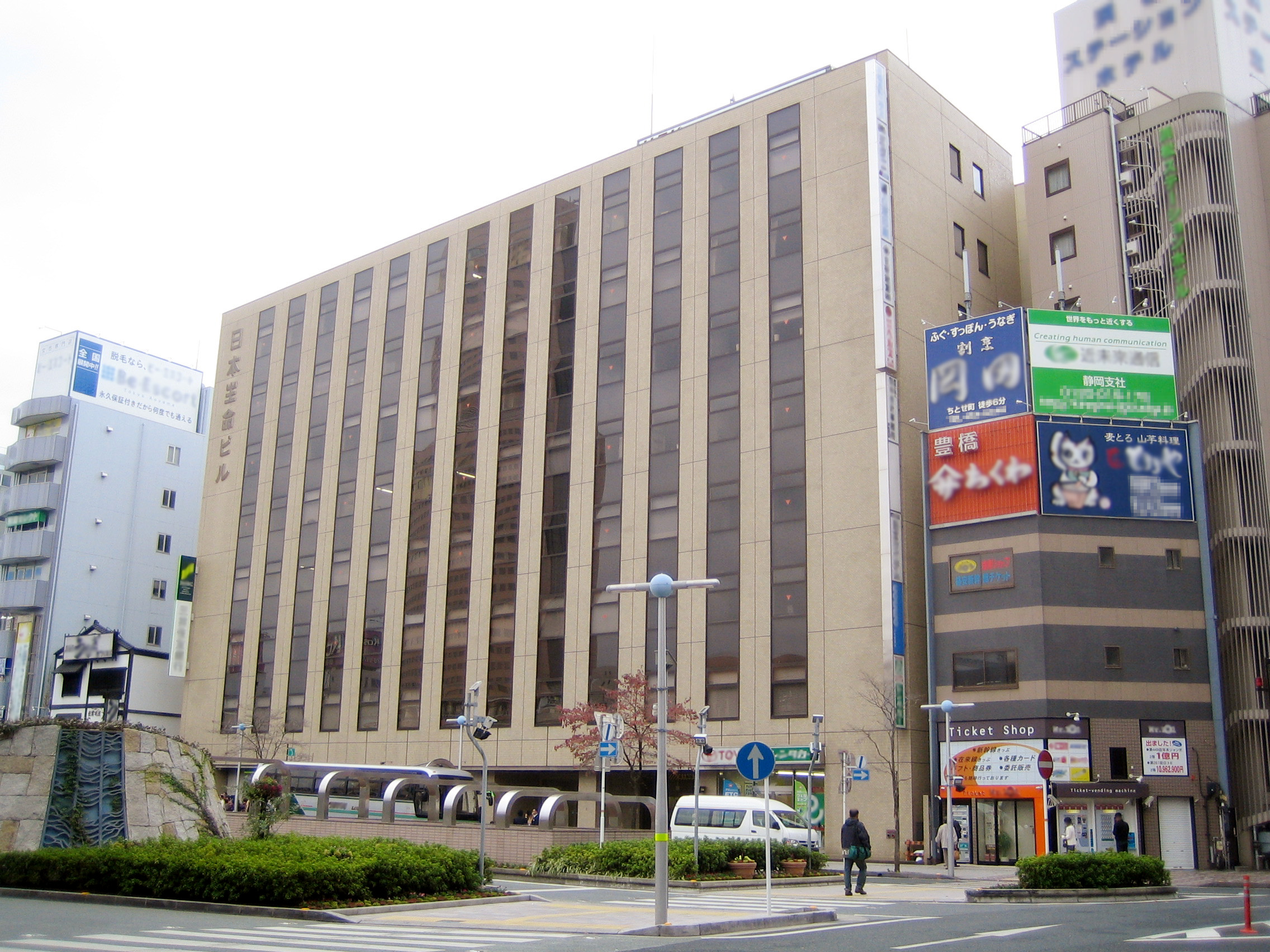
- Headquarters of Hamamatsu Photonics
- Native name: 浜松ホトニクス株式会社
- Type: Public KK
- Traded as: TYO: 6965
- Industry: Electronics
- Founded: (September 29, 1953; 73 years ago)
- Founder: Heihachiro Horiuchi
- Headquarters: 325-6, Sunayama-cho, Chūō-ku, Hamamatsu City, Shizuoka, 430-8587, Japan
- Key people: Tadashi Maruno (President and CEO)
- Products: Photomultiplier tubes; Imaging devices; Light sources; Opto-semiconductors; Imaging and analyzing systems
- Revenue: ▼JPY 203.9 billion (FY 2024) (US$ 1.35 billion) (FY 2024)
- Net income: ▼JPY 25.1 billion (FY 2024) (US$ 166.7 million) (FY 2024)
- Number of employees: 4,225 (consolidated, as of September 30, 2024)
- Website: Official website

NMOS linear image sensor S3901-256Q

Hamamatsu Photonics K.K. (浜松ホトニクス株式会社, Hamamatsu Hotonikusu Kabushiki-Kaisha) is a Japanese manufacturer of optical sensors (including photomultiplier tubes), electric light sources, and other optical devices and their applied instruments for scientific, technical and medical use.

The company was founded in 1953 by Heihachiro Horiuchi, a former student of Kenjiro Takayanagi, who is known as "the father of Japanese television".

== Description ==
Hermann Simon, a leading German business author and thinker, mentioned Hamamatsu in his book titled Hidden Champions of the Twenty-First Century: The Success Strategies of Unknown World Market Leaders as an example of a "Hidden Champion".

As examples of uses, Hamamatsu CCD image sensors are used at the Subaru Telescope of the National Astronomical Observatory of Japan, and the sensors made by the company also helped confirm the existence of the Higgs boson in research that led to the 2013 Nobel Physics prize.

Hamamatsu Photonics' photomultiplier tubes (PMTs) were used in the Super-Kamiokande neutrino detector facility at the University of Tokyo where 2015 Nobel Prize Laureate Takaaki Kajita conducted his research. In using products contributed by Hamamatsu Photonics, "Kajita was able to prove that neutrinos do in fact have mass -- a major shift in our fundamental understanding of how the universe works," said Tom Baer, chair of the Photonics Industry Neuroscience Group of the National Photonics Initiative. "This win is a tremendous accomplishment for Kajita and Hamamatsu Photonics."
