= United States v. Dentsply Int'l, Inc. =

United States v. Dentsply Int'l, Inc., was a 2005 Third Circuit antitrust decision in the United States finding that Dentsply, a monopolist manufacturer-supplier of dental supplies, used its exclusive dealing policy to keep rival firms' sales "below the critical level necessary for any rival to pose a real threat to Dentsply's market share,".

This was in violation of Sherman Act § 2. The court so held despite the lack of long term contracts between the manufacturer and its dealers.

== Background ==
Dentsply manufactures artificial teeth for use in dentures and other restorative appliances and sells them to dental products dealers. The dealers, in turn, supply the teeth and various other materials to dental laboratories, which fabricate dentures for sale to dentists. Dentsply has long dominated the industry, which consists of a dozen manufacturers, with a 75%–80% market share on a revenue basis, and is at least 15 times larger than its next closest competitors, which have market shares of 5% or less.

Dental laboratories sell artificial teeth and other supplies to dealers, who sell them to dentists. Dentsply sells teeth and other dental supplies to its network of 23 dealers. Some other manufacturers sell both to dealers and directly to laboratories, but Dentsply does not. In 1993 Dentsply adopted "Dealer Criterion 6," which provides that in order to effectively promote Dentsply products, authorized dealers "may not add further tooth lines to their product offering." Dentsply does not have term agreements with dealers; the relationship is terminable at will. Dentsply's top five dealers account for 83% of its sales, and Dentsply allowed them to continue to carry other manufacturers' products that they were selling in 1993 at the adoption of Dealer Criterion 6. None of Dentsply's dealers has given up Dentsply's product line to take on a competitive line. .

The Government sued Dentsply, seeking to enjoin its exclusive dealing.

== Ruling of district court ==
The district court found that Dentsply's proffered business justifications for the Dealer Criterion 6 policy were pretextual and were actually designed expressly to exclude its rivals from access to dealers. Nonetheless, the district court concluded that other dealers were available and direct sales to laboratories was also a viable method of doing business. Moreover, the court concluded that Dentsply had not created a market with supra competitive pricing, that dealers were free to leave the Dentsply network at any time, and that the Government failed to prove that Dentsply's actions "have been or could be successful in preventing 'new or potential competitors from gaining a foothold in the market.' " The district court therefore granted judgment in favor of Dentsply and denied injunctive relief.

== Ruling of Third Circuit ==
The Third Circuit reversed. It focused on the dealer network as the "crucial point in the distribution chain [at which] monopoly power over the market for artificial teeth was established." It said, "The reality in this case is that the firm that ties up the key dealers rules the market."

Accordingly, the district court was mistaken in concluding that Dentsply lacked the power to exclude competitors from the laboratories, "the ultimate consumers," that incorporated the teeth into dentures and similar products that dentists provided to patients; and by the same token the district court was clearly wrong to say Dentsply did not engage in market foreclosure because other manufacturers could just sell to the laboratories directly. Although some sales were made by manufacturers to the laboratories, overwhelming numbers were made to dealers, who then sold to the laboratories. "The evidence in this case demonstrates that for a considerable time, through the use of Dealer Criterion 6, Dentsply has been able to exclude competitors from the dealers' network, a narrow, but heavily traveled channel to the dental laboratories." The court concluded, "The long-entrenched Dentsply dealer network with its ties to the laboratories makes it impracticable for a manufacturer to rely on direct distribution to the laboratories in any significant amount."

The Third Circuit found that Dentsply's exclusive dealing agreements had substantial anticompetitive effects:

By ensuring that the key dealers offer Dentsply teeth either as the only or dominant choice, Dealer Criterion 6 has a significant effect in preserving Dentsply's monopoly. It helps keep sales of competing teeth below the critical level necessary for any rival to pose a real threat to Dentsply's market share. As such, Dealer Criterion 6 is a solid pillar of harm to competition.

Although their relationship with Dentsply can be terminated at will, the key dealers "have a strong economic incentive to continue carrying Dentsply's teeth." In one incident, current and potential customers of Atlanta Dental requested it to carry Vita teeth so as to have a local source instead of having to order directly from that West Coast manufacturer. But Dentsply advised Atlanta Dental that carrying Vita would cut off access to Dentsply teeth, which constituted over 90% of its tooth sales revenue. Atlanta Dental therefore chose not to add the Vita line.

Other dealers tried selling other manufacturers' teeth, but Dentsply threatened to stop supplying its product to them, so they dropped the other lines. Because the volume of business done with Dentsply is so large in comparison to the business that violating Dentsply's exclusive dealing policy to take on another manufacturer's product would sacrifice, dealers comply with the policy. "Criterion 6 imposes an 'all-or-nothing' choice on the dealers. The fact that dealers have chosen not to drop Dentsply teeth in favor of a rival's brand demonstrates that they have acceded to heavy economic pressure." The court concluded that "Dentsply's grip on its 23 authorized dealers effectively choked off the market for artificial teeth, leaving only a small sliver for competitors." That is, Dentsply excluded competition by substantially raising rivals' costs to access ultimate customers.

The Third Circuit then turned to Dentsply's business justifications. It found that the "record amply supports the District Court's conclusion that Dentsply's alleged justification was pretextual and did not excuse its exclusionary practices."

Accordingly, the court reversed the district court's judgment and directed it to grant the injunctive relief requested by the Government.

== Subsequent developments ==
=== Hess case ===
In its 2010 decision under the caption Howard Hess Dental Labs. Inc. v. Dentsply Int'l, Inc., the Third Circuit considered two private antitrust cases that two dental laboratories separately brought against Dentsply and many of its dealers—the Hess case and Jersey Dental Labs. Inc. v. Dentsply Int'l, Inc. (the Jersey Dental case)—covering the same ground as the main case described above (the Government case). In the first of the two cases, the issue was whether the district court properly denied a motion for summary judgment on a monopolization claim against Dentsply as well as the subsequent dismissal of the action. In the second case, the issue was whether the district court properly dismissed the claim against Dentsply of conspiracy to restrain trade and conspiracy to monopolize claims against both the manufacturer and its dealers for failure to state a claim. The Third Circuit affirmed the district court's rulings.

In the first case, the Hess case, the plaintiffs sought to meet their burden on their motion for summary judgment as to monopolization by arguing collateral estoppel from the judgment of monopolization in the Government case. The question was whether the plaintiffs sufficiently showed a threat of antitrust injury if Dentsply engages in future violations of the same type as alleged. "In other words," the court said, they needed to "demonstrate a significant threat of injury from an impending violation of the antitrust laws or from a contemporary violation likely to continue or recur." The Government case was based "primarily on Dentsply's adoption of 'Dealer Criterion 6,' an exclusive dealing policy that was enforced against most dealers."

The Third Circuit said that it found collateral estoppel inapplicable because the judgment in the Government was not dependent upon the determination that anticompetitive injury to the dealers such as the plaintiffs was essential to the prior determination that Dentsply had committed an antitrust violation. The Government case requests a determination whether Dentsply's conduct was anticompetitive. That had two issues: "first, whether Dentsply possessed monopoly power; and second, whether Dentsply used that power to edge out competition." The ruling made requires only a finding that Dentsply's manufacturer competitors was injured. There was no "need to conclude that any upstream purchasers, such as [plaintiff Hess was] threatened with injury." That might have happened, but that does not mean that it was essential to the holding. Therefore, there was no collateral estoppel and therefore, further, "Dentsply should not be precluded from defending itself against the plaintiffs' claim for injunctive relief." Aside from arguing collateral estoppel, the plaintiffs made no showing of antitrust injury. Furthermore, since the Government case resulted in an injunction that already prohibited Dentsply from pursuing the very conduct that gave rise to the Plaintiffs' claim, the plaintiffs did not need a duplicative injunction. The Third Circuit therefore affirmed the district court's denial of the plaintiffs' summary judgment motion.

The district court then dismissed the case, because it found that there were no genuine questions of material fact. The Third Circuit approved that action: "To the extent the Plaintiffs thought that the District Court's denial of their summary judgment motion entitled them to pursue their claims any further, they were mistaken, as a plaintiff asserting antitrust claims does not get to a jury simply by filing a complaint and hoping for the best." Based on the previous proceedings, the district court "concluded that the Plaintiffs could not prevail on their claim for injunctive relief against Dentsply" and, the Third Circuit stated, "we agree with that conclusion." Accordingly, the court affirmed the dismissal of the complaint in the Hess case.

In the Jersey Dental case, the claim were conspiracies to monopolize and restrain trade. The plaintiffs argued that all Dentsply's dealers knew about "Dealer Criterion 6"; "every Dealer knew that every other Dealer agreed, or would agree, to this same plan"; and that it "was obvious to each Dealer that—only if all of the other Dealers complied—would the purpose of Dealer Criterion 6 be achieved." In other words, they claimed that there was a hub-and-spoke conspiracy. The Third Circuit said that, aside from conclusory allegations, there was no showing of a "rim" for the hub-and-spoke conspiracy—concerted action by the dealers:

Here, even assuming the Plaintiffs have adequately identified the hub (Dentsply) as well as the spokes (the Dealers), we conclude that the amended complaint lacks any allegation of an agreement among the Dealers themselves. The amended complaint states only in a conclusory manner that all of the defendants—Dentsply and all the Dealers included—conspired and knew about the alleged plan to maintain Dentsply's market position. The amended complaint alleges, for instance, that "Dentsply made clear to each . . . dealer that every other Dentsply dealer was . . . required to agree to the same exclusive dealing arrangement, and that every other Dentsply dealer had so agreed." . . . But to survive dismissal it does not suffice to simply say that the defendants had knowledge; there must be factual allegations to plausibly suggest as much. There are none here. In other words, the "rim" connecting the various "spokes" is missing.

The court insisted that "the Plaintiffs' allegations do not offer even a gossamer inference of any degree of coordination among the Dealers." Instead, they do no more than intimate "merely parallel conduct that could just as well be independent action." The plaintiffs also argued that "even if they have not adequately alleged an overarching conspiracy between and among Dentsply and all of its Dealers, they at least have adequately alleged several bilateral, vertical conspiracies between Dentsply and the Dealers." The court, however, denied that the complaint "cannot be fairly understood to allege the existence of several unconnected, bilateral, vertical conspiracies between Dentsply and each Dealer," despite what the plaintiffs now argue. They did not "allege any facts plausibly suggesting a unity of purpose, a common design and understanding, or a meeting of the minds between and among Dentsply and all of the Dealers." Accordingly, the district court properly dismissed the conspiracy claims.

== Criticism ==
Maurice Stucke, in Is Intent Relevant?, in the Journal of Law, Economics and Policy, criticizes the Third Circuit for denying the relevance of intent. He approvingly quotes the Government's district court brief in the Dentsply case arguing that Dentsply's anticompetitive intent is "strong corroborative evidence that its conduct is anticompetitive," and maintaining that Dentsply "erroneously contends that the evidence is irrelevant." He agrees that disregarding actors' intent simply ignores Supreme Court precedent that exclusionary intent is "relevant to the question whether the challenged conduct is fairly characterized as 'exclusionary' or 'anticompetitive.' " The Government argued that the specific evidence in the record of how Dentsply "intended for its exclusive dealing to harm competition" was highly probative, and Stucke shares that view.

Stucke explains that in the past jurists and scholars oriented by neo-classical economic theory (for example, that of the University of Chicago) have objected to admitting intent evidence in civil antitrust trials—asserting, "From an economic perspective, which focuses on effects, an emphasis on intent seems misplaced." But, says Stucke, "economic theory has evolved since these criticisms were first made."

Stucke concludes: "Many courts have taken the correct approach in admitting intent evidence in civil antitrust trials. Intent evidence is relevant in predicting consequences and interpreting facts."
