= Dentsply Sirona =

Healthcare Company

Dentsply Sirona Inc.
- Formerly: Sirona Dental Systems (1887 - 2016) Dentists Supply Company (1889–1969) Dentsply International Inc. (1969–2016)
- Type: Public
- Traded as: Nasdaq: XRAY; S&P 400 component
- Industry: Dental equipment
- Founded: 2016; 10 years ago, in New York City
- Headquarters: Charlotte, North Carolina, U.S.
- Key people: Daniel Scavilla (CEO)
- Revenue: ▲US$4.03 billion (2019)
- Number of employees: ≈ 15,000 (December 2023)
- Website: dentsplysirona.com

Dentsply Sirona Inc. is an American dental equipment manufacturer and dental consumables producer that markets its products in over 120 countries. It has factories in 21 countries. The present company is largely the result of a merger in 1993 in which Gendex Corporation acquired Dentsply International Inc. for $590 million.

As an equipment maker, it designs and manufactures laboratory and specialty products relating to dental supplies. With regard to consumable products, it specializes in anesthetics, plaque and gum disease prevention (prophylaxis) and tooth polishers. It also designs and constructs artificial teeth. It has also been cited as a key player in the future intra-oral flat panel sensor market. Because of the income disparity between wealthy and developing nations, the variety of products in demand differs from region to region (and thus subsidiary to subsidiary since many of them are regional).

On August 28, 2022, Dentsply Sirona announced the appointment of Simon D. Campion, formerly Executive Vice President and President of the Interventional segment for BD, as President and Chief Executive Officer and a member of the board. In 2018 a Netherlands-based certification company awarded Dentsply the “Top Employer” certification.

In 2019 the company joined forces with the American Association for Dental Research (AADR) to co-sponsor the Student Competition for Advancing Dental Research and its Application (SCADA). The SCADA aims to bolster students research.

The company was ranked #56 by Forbes as America's Best Midsize Employers 2019.

== History ==
=== Name ===
The name Dentsply Sirona International is a compound of the names of two distinct dental technology companies: Dentsply and Sirona Dental Systems, respectively. The current name is the result of a merger between the two companies in 2016.

=== Sirona Dental Systems ===
Sirona Dental Systems was founded in 1877 in Erlangen, Germany.

=== Dentsply Incorporated ===
==== 1899–2000 ====
Dentsply Incorporated was founded as Dentist's Supply Company in New York City in 1889 when a proposed business charter filed by three men - Dr. Jacob Frick Franz, John Sheppard, and Dean Osborne - was approved by the acting Commissioner of Deeds of New York City, Lewis Fawcett. Starting with an investment of $10,000 (roughly equivalent to $377,080 in 2024), the charter stipulated that the corporation would last fifty years pending renewal. Shortly after its founding, the company made its first acquisition, a Pennsylvania porcelain teeth manufacturer. One of the four founders, George H. Whiteley became the main operator of the company as a result of his experience as a ceramicist. Whiteley's contributions to the company were invaluable as he was responsible for many innovations such as a patented process involving platinum rings that reduced tooth breakage. Other innovations (credited to doctors like James Williams who were hired by the company for research purposes) included better fitting dentures, tooth size for people of different face shapes and age specific colored teeth.

In the early 1920s, the company selected European distributor E. de Trey & Sons as its primary marketer to Europe, however it quickly became the company's main distributor in the US also. A rivalry between De Trey and the main other denture equipment producer at the time, Ash Company, nearly eliminated cash flows due to extreme price cutting. The problem was resolved when the two decided to merge their distribution businesses into one named the Amalgamated Dental Company Limited. In 1925, 45% of Zahnfabrik (artificial teeth producer) was bought by Dentists' Supply and its distributor Amalgamated Dental bought a 30% interest in the manufacturer.

High American tariffs and increased efforts to gain market share abroad, especially in Europe and Australia, led the company to set up more research and manufacturing centers abroad. Its first foreign subsidiary was established in Australia as a means to acquire Natudryl Manufacturing. In the 1950s and 1960s, the company developed many of the ideas used by its equipment today like tooth cleaning machine Dentsply Cavitron and Neolux which improved the finish of plastic teeth. The company renamed itself Dentsply International in 1969 due to its products' brand name being more widely recognized.

Key acquisitions by Dentists' Supply Company: LD Caulk Company in 1963, Ransom and Randolph Company in 1964, F&F Koenigkramer Company (chairs and stools). Largest was Amalgamated Dental Industrial (former distributor that played a major role in helping the company grow early on that also controlled Australia's largest dental supply chain) in 1976.

In 1993, after it acquired Gendex Corporation in a reverse takeover, the company went public on the NASDAQ. The new company then purchased medical X-ray tubes supplier Eureka X-Ray Inc., which was key since Gendex was a major manufacturer of X-ray systems (Eureka X-Ray was later sold in 1994). Healthco, its main distributor in the US, went bankrupt in 1993.

=== 2000–present ===
In 2010, the most important markets for sales were Europe & CIS (40%), USA (37%), Latin America (5%), Asia (excl CIS and Japan, 5%), Canada (4%), Japan (4%), Middle East & Africa (3%) and Australia (2%). Dentsply holds a leading market share in the dental restorative sector ($4.0 billion according to the company).

In June 2011, Dentsply acquired Astra Tech, the world's third largest maker of dental implants from the Anglo-Swedish pharmaceutical company AstraZeneca for $1.8 billion. The deal raises revenue by 25% ($535M) and was completed on August 31, 2011. Acquisitions in 2011 caused the value of long term debt to increase by 147% while total assets grew by 146% (current assets however decreased in value). Acquisition/restructuring charges were one of the reasons net income decreased 7.4%.

Markets outside the United States are becoming increasingly important: they accounted for 67% of Dentsply revenue in 2013 steady with 2012 but up from 66% and 63% the previous two years.

In 2012, acquisitions contributed all of the growth in sales (16.2%, currency effects were -3.8%). 2012 sales growth by region: Europe 27.5% (vs 17.9% in 2011), USA 13.8% (vs 4.9%), elsewhere 15.9% (vs 9.4%). 88% of net sales were in dental products, 12% from consumable medical device products (casting industry).

On February 29, 2016 Dentsply combined with Long Island-based Sirona Dental Systems in a $14.5 billion merger of equals. While both supply dental products, Sirona's business centers on dental equipment in contrast with Dentsply's consumables.

In October 2017, CEO Jeffrey Slovin, executive chairman Bret Wise, and president Christopher Clark all resigned. On January 17, 2018, Dentsply Sirona announced the appointment of Donald Casey Jr., formerly CEO of the Medical Segment of Cardinal Health, as CEO and a member of the board, with Casey to take the role in February and succeed interim CEO Mark Thierer.

In January 2021, Dentsply announced the acquisition of Byte, a company specializing in orthodontics, for $1.04 billion.

In April 2022, Dentsply Sirona fired CEO Donald Casey. The interim CEO was announced to be John Groetelaars. In September 2022, Simon Campion was announced as the full-time CEO replacing Don Casey. Both former CEO Donald Casey and former CFO Jorge Gomez are under investigation by Dentsply Sirona Inc. and the SEC for securities fraud.

In June 2023, it was reported by the Chief Executive Leadership institute of the Yale School of Management that the company continued to do "business as usual" in Russia while many others had wound down or curtailed their operations there in the wake of the full-scale invasion of Ukraine.This decision has been widely criticized as enabling the Russian economy and, by extension, its war effort, undermining global solidarity against the aggression and raising ethical concerns about the company's commitment to social responsibility.

On July 21st, 2025, Dentsply Sirona announced Daniel Scavilla will become President and Chief Executive Officer starting on August 1st, 2025. Daniel will replace current CEO Simon Campion.

== See also ==
- United States v. Dentsply Int'l, Inc.
