= Real net output ratio =

The Real Net Output Ratio (or Vertical Range of Manufacture) is a term commonly used by German economists and infrequently used in wider Europe, and globally. It is used as a measure of vertical integration, though typically limited to a business, rather than across a group of associated companies or a nation. The term was first popularized outside Germany in Hermann Simon's 1996 publication, Hidden champions: lessons from 500 of the world's best unknown companies.

In a value chain, the Real Net Output Ratio is the fraction of the internal (company specific) production on the total production value of one company. The total production value of a company consists of internal production plus the sum of externally produced goods and services.

$\textstyle Real\,Net\,Output\,Ratio = \frac{internal\,production}{total\,production\,value} = \frac{internal\,production}{internal\,production\,+\,externally\,produced\,goods\,+\,externally\,produced\,services}$

A Real Net Output Ratio of 0% relates to a company that does not have its own production and therefore only does trading.
