= Lateral expansion =

Lateral expansion, in economics, is the growth of a business enterprise through the acquisition of similar companies, in the hope of achieving economies of scale or economies of scope. Unchecked lateral expansion can lead to powerful conglomerates or monopolies.

Related is vertical expansion, which is the growth of a business enterprise through the acquisition of companies that produce the intermediate goods needed by the business or help market and distribute its final goods. Any such value chain activities can be acquired through vertical expansion.
