= Servicewüste =

Servicewüste (German pronunciation: [ˈsœːɐ̯vɪsˌvyːstə], service desert) is a management buzzword coined in Der Spiegel by economics professor Hermann Simon in 1995, referring to "the total lack of acceptable services". It is used to describe a country, region or area where the service sector generally or customer service specifically is weak or completely undeveloped. The term has correspondingly negative connotations.

It is often used for Germany, where it is perceived that many organizations do not offer any other services after the purchase of a product and do not consider customers' needs. Generally repairs and maintenance will be done only after paying additional fees. An example given by Simon is that in contrast to those in the United States, German supermarket checkouts did not have an employee dedicated to sacking groceries.

== Bibliography ==
- Stefan F. Gross: Ausbruch aus der Servicewüste 1998, ISBN 978-3478242608
- Viola Reinhardt: Dienstleistung beginnt mit einem Lächeln: Blüten in der Servicewüste (14 May 2008), ISBN 978-3837026177
