= Martin Fassnacht =

German economist

Martin Fassnacht (born 1965, in Freiburg in Breisgau) is a German economist, professor and director of the Chair of Strategy and Marketing at the WHU – Otto Beisheim School of Managementin Düsseldorf.

== Early life and education ==
Fassnacht was born in 1965 in Freiburg in Breisgau in Germany.

== Career ==
From 1990 to 1995, Fassnacht was an academic assistant at the Chair for Marketing of Hermann Simon (Manager) at the Johannes Gutenberg University of Mainz, getting his doctorate at the beginning of 1996. During this time he spent a semester as a visiting scholar at the Owen Graduate School of Management, Vanderbilt University, Nashville, USA. Fassnacht completed his studies at the University of Mannheim, getting his degree in Marketing and Industry (in German: Dipl.-Kfm.).

From 2001 to 2003, Fassnacht was an associate professor at the Chair of Marketing at the University of Paderborn, after having worked as an assistant professor with Prof. Dr. Dr. h.c. mult. Christian Homburg both at WHU – Otto Beisheim School of Management – and the University of Mannheim. During his work as assistant professor he was visiting scholar at the McCombs School of Business, University of Texas at Austin, Austin, USA, and worked as a consultant on a freelance basis for "Homburg & Partner", later taking over the Management Education side of corporate consulting there.

=== WHU – Otto Beisheim School of Management ===
Since 2003, Fassnacht had held the Otto Beisheim Endowed Chair of Strategy and Marketing at the WHU – Otto Beisheim School of Management. He is also the Speaker of the Marketing and Sales Group, Academic Director of the Center for Market-Oriented Corporate Management (Zentrums für Marktorientierte Unternehmensführung - ZMU), Advisory Board Chairman of the Henkel Center for Consumer Goods (HCCG) and Academic Director of the WHU MBA Program. Fassnacht is also consulted regularly as a strategic advisor to the consumer goods, retail, and service industries.

From 2003 to 2010, Fassnacht was the academic director of two executive education programs for Metro Group.

From 2007 to 2009, Fassnacht was Vice Dean of the WHU – Otto Beisheim School of Management, and Academic Director of the Department of Marketing and Communications, and Academic Director of the Master of Science Program.

From 2013 until 2014, he was the Chairman of the Marketing Commission of the German Association of Economic Professors (Verband der Hochschullehrer für Betriebswirtschaft VHB).

Fassnacht is a member of the Schmalenbach Society of Business Management (Schmalenbach-Gesellschaft für Betriebswirtschaft) in Cologne, Germany, the Erich Gutenberg Working Group (Erich-Gutenberg Arbeitsgemeinschaft), the German Association of Economic Professors (Verband der Hochschullehrer für Betriebswirtschaft VHB), the American Marketing Association (AMA), the Academy of Marketing Science (AMS) and the European Marketing Academy (EMAC).

== Research ==
The main research focus of Fassnacht and his team is in the areas of pricing, brand management, retail marketing and omnichannel business.

Fassnacht is the author of numerous publications in national and international magazines and newspapers, the Journal of Business Economics, Schmalenbachs Journal of Business Economic Research (Schmalenbachs Zeitschrift für betriebswirtschaftliche Forschung), Journal of Marketing, Journal of Service Research, the Journal of Business-to-Business Marketing and the Journal of Business Research.

== Honours ==
Four years in a row, the Frankfurter Allgemeine Zeitung listed Professor Dr. Martin Fassnacht in its Economist Ranking among the 100 most influential economists in Germany. In 2017 he was ranked 56th, in 2018 64th, in 2019 68th and in 2020 he took 91st place.

He has received several awards for his scientific work. His article "The Role of Soft Factors in Implementing a Service-Oriented Strategy in Industrial Marketing Companies" was voted "Outstanding Article of the Year 2003" by the editorial board of the Journal of Business-to-Business Marketing. His article "Quality of Electronic Services: Conceptualizing and Testing a Hierarchical Model" was awarded the "Best Paper Award" in the topic area "Service Marketing" at the 2005 Summer Marketing Educators' Conference of the American Marketing Association (AMA). The article "Consequences of web-based service quality: Uncovering a multi-faceted chain of effects" was listed as "Top Cited Article 2007-2011" by the Journal of Interactive Marketing. The article "The impact of external social and internal personal forces on consumers' brand community engagement on Facebook" was distinguished with the Highly Commended Paper 2017 award by the Journal of Product & Brand Management. For their book Preismanagement (Price Management) Hermann Simon and Martin Fassnacht were awarded the Georg-Bergler-Preis für Absatzwirtschaft 2010. This prize is awarded every two years by the magazine "absatzwirtschaft", the German Marketing Association (Deutscher Marketing-Verband) and the German Society of Consumer Research, Nuremberg (Gesellschaft für Konsumforschung, GfK-Nürnberg e.V.) and, with prize money of 20,000 euros, is one of the highest endowed marketing textbook awards in Europe.

== Selected publications ==
- Simon, H./Fassnacht, M./Schmitz, A.-K. (2024): Preismanagement: Strategie – Analyse – Entscheidung – Umsetzung, 5. vollständig überarbeitete und erweiterte Auflage, Wiesbaden: Springer Fachmedien Wiesbaden.
- Fassnacht, M. (2024): Die Marketing-Pyramide wackelt in: Frankfurter Allgemeine Zeitung, Ausgabe 09.12.2024, S. 16.
- Nelius, Y./Fassnacht, M. (2024): Kosteneinsparungen und Sanierungen in der Konsumgüter- und Handelsbranche: Worauf es für in Schieflage geratene Unternehmen wirklich ankommt, in: Der Sanierungsberater, SanB 04/2024, S. 173-175.
- Fassnacht, M./Nelius, Y. (2024): So gelingt dem Einzelhandel der Turnaround, in: Springer Fachmedien Wiesbaden, https://www.springerprofessional.de/transformation/handel/so-gelingt-dem-einzelhandel-der-turnaround/50111736, 22.10.2024.
- Vollmar, J./Fassnacht, M. (2024): Die neue Macht der Autohäuser, in: Frankfurter Allgemeine Zeitung, Ausgabe 14.10.2024, S. 16.
- Biallowons, S./Schmitz, A.-K./Fassnacht, M. (2024): Drivers of Line Extension Success. Understanding and Implementing Line Extensions of FMCG Brands, in Marketing Review St. Gallen, No. 6/2024, pp. 70–78.
- Schmitz, A.-K./Fassnacht, M./Platzek, F. (2023): Marken nachhaltiger prägen, in: Frankfurter Allgemeine Zeitung, Ausgabe 11.12.2023 (288), S. 16.
- Schmitz, A.-K./Brexendorf, T./Fassnacht, M. (2023): Vertical Line Extension: A Systematic Review of Research on Upward and Downward Line Extension, in: Journal of Product & Brand Management, Vol. 32 (6), pp. 828–848.
- Szajna, M./Fassnacht, M. (2023): So gewinnen Unternehmen Nachwuchskräfte, in: Lebensmittelzeitung, Ausgabe 28/2023, S. 46.
- Schmitz, A.-K./Göring-Lensing-Hebben, K./Fassnacht, M. (2023): Unlocking Consumers' Responsibilities – A Corporate Perspective on Enhancing Sustainable Consumer Behavior, in: Proceedings of the European Marketing Academy Conference, Odense (Denmark), May 23–26, 2023.
- Fassnacht, M. (2023): Der Gewinn wird für Unternehmen wichtiger denn je, in: Frankfurter Allgemeine Zeitung, Ausgabe 06.02.2023, S. 16.
- Fassnacht, M./Schmitz, A.-K. (2022): Sport-Sponsoren landen leicht im Abseits, in: Frankfurter Allgemeine Zeitung, Ausgabe 12.12.2022, S. 16.
- Fassnacht, M./Vollmar, J. (2022): Wie Autohäuser überleben können, in: Frankfurter Allgemeine Zeitung, Ausgabe 15.07.2022, S.16.
- Schmitz, A.-K./Schnabl, L./Göring-Lensing-Hebben, K./Fassnacht, M. (2022): Responsibility beyond the Point of Sale: How Product Stewardship Forges Sustainable Consumption Behavior, in: Proceedings of the European Marketing Academy, 51st, Budapest (Hungary), May 24, 2022.
- Schmitz, A.-K./Fassnacht, M./Göring-Lensing-Hebben, K./Fiebig, O. (2022): Strategic Aspects of Omnichannel Business, in: Corsten, H. & Roth, S. (Hrsg.), Handbuch Digitalisierung, Vahlen, S. 843–856.
- Köhli, K.C./Fassnacht, M. (2022): Elektronische B2C-Marktplätze als Vertriebskanal in Deutschland – Eine Taxonomie, in: Corsten, H. & Roth, S. (Hrsg.), Handbuch Digitalisierung, Vahlen, S. 569–587.
- Schmitz, A.-K., Fassnacht, M., Schnabl, L. (2021): Spielraum für höhere Preise nutzen: Wegen der Inflation müssen Anbieter mehr Geld von Kunden verlangen. Aber wie?, Frankfurter Allgemeine Zeitung: FAZ, 18.10.2021, S. 16.
- Simon, H./Fassnacht, M. (2021): Price Management: 正版 价格管理:理论与实践 [德]赫尔曼 西蒙 [Chinese version], Beijing: China Machine Press.
- Fassnacht, M./Dahm, J.-M. (2021): Growing luxury brands by increasing the price: does the Veblen effect exist? in: Luxury Research Journal, 2021 Vol.2 No.1/2, pp. 99 – 139.
- Lechermeier, J./Fassnacht, M./Wagner, T. (2020): Testing the influence of real-time performance feedback on employees in digital services, Journal of Service Management, Vol. 31 No. 3, pp. 345–371.
- Schmitz, A.-K./Fassnacht, M (2020): Premiumization as a profit growth strategy. A framework of strategic options, in: Marketing Review St. Gallen, No. 3/2020, pp. 60–68.
- Fassnacht, M./Szajna, M. (2020): Plädoyer für das stationäre Geschäft, in: Lebensmittelzeitung, Ausgabe 4/2020, p. 42.
- Fassnacht, M./Mahadevan, J. (2019): Wachsende Handelsmacht, in: Lebensmittelzeitung, Ausgabe 20/2019, p. 28.
- Simon, H./Fassnacht, M. (2019): Price Management: Zarządzanie cenami [Polish Edition], Warsaw, Wydawnictwo Naukowe PWN.
- Simon, H./Fassnacht, M. (2019): Price Management: Прайс-менеджмент - Стратегия, анализ, решение и реализация, [Russian Version], Moscow: Byblos Publishing.
- Fassnacht, M./Beatty, S/Szajna, M. (2019): Combating the negative effects of showrooming: Successful salesperson tactics for converting showroomers into buyers, in Journal of Business Research, Vol. 102, pp. 131–139.
- Simon, H./Fassnacht, M. (2019): Price Management: Strategy, Analysis, Decision, Implementation [English Version], 1st ed. 2019, Springer.
- Fassnacht, M./Dahm, J.-M. (2018): The Veblen effect and (in)conspicuous consumption – a state of the art article, in: Luxury Research Journal, Vol. 1, No. 4, pp. 343–371.
- Lechermeier, J./Fassnacht, M. (2018): How do performance feedback characteristics influence recipients’ reactions? A state-of-the-art review on feedback source, timing, and valence effects, in: Management Review Quarterly, No.1/2018, pp. 1–49.
- Bergers, D./Fassnacht, M. (2017): Debiasing Strategies in the Price Management Process, in: Marketing Review St. Gallen, No. 6/2017, pp. 50–58.
- Fassnacht, M./Schmitz, A.-K. (2017): Digitization and the Retail Landscape – 10 Theses, in: Marketing Review St. Gallen, No. 5/2017, pp. 10–17.
- Lechermeier, J. / Fassnacht, M. / Wagner, T. (2017): The effects of immediate customer feedback on frontline employees´ engagement and service performance, in: Proceedings of the 26th Annual Frontiers in Service Conference, June 22–25, 2017, New York, USA.
- Fassnacht, M. (2017): Die Innovationskraft des Marketings. in: Absatzwirtschaft, Sonderausgabe zur dmexco 2017, S. 58–59.
- Simon, C./ Brexendorf, T.O./ Fassnacht, M. (2016): The impact of external social and internal personal forces on consumers’ brand community engagement on Facebook, in: Journal of Product & Brand Management, Vol. 25 Iss 5 pp. 409 – 423.
- Simon, H./Fassnacht, M. (2016): Preismanagement: Strategie - Analyse - Entscheidung Umsetzung, 4. vollständig neu bearbeitete und erweiterte Auflage, Wiesbaden: Springer Gabler.
- Scharwey, A. C./Fassnacht M. (2016): Luxury-Specific Dimensions of Customer-Salesperson Relationships, in: Thieme, W. M. (Hrsg.): Luxusmarkenmanagement: Grundlagen, Strategien und praktische Umsetzung, Wiesbaden: Springer, S. 421–436
- Fassnacht, M./Schmitz, A.-K. (2016): Leistungsbezogene Preisdifferenzierung bei Dienstleistungen, in: Corsten, H./Roth, S. (Hrsg.): Handbuch Dienstleistungsmanagement, München: Vahlen, S. 789–807.
- Fassnacht, M./Unterhuber, S. (2016): Consumer Response to Online/Offline Price Differentation, in: Journal of Retailing and Consumer Services. Vol. 28, pp. 137–148.
- Goetz, D.M./Fassnacht, M. (2015): Brand Name Strategies for Successful Upward Extension, in: Marketing Review St. Gallen, Vol. 32, No. 5, pp. 26–35.
- Fassnacht, M./Königsfeld, J. A. (2015): Sales Promotion Management in Retailing: Tasks, Benchmarks, and Future Trends, in: Marketing Review St. Gallen, Vol. 32, No. 3, pp. 67–77.
- Fassnacht, M./Scharwey, A. (2015): Social Distance in Luxury Customer–Salesperson Relationships, in: Bartsch, S./Blümelhuber, C. (Hrsg.): Always Ahead im Marketing, Festschrift für Prof. Dr. Anton Meyer, Wiesbaden: Gabler, S. 433–448.
- Fassnacht, M./Schmidt, T./Pannek, J. (2015): Determinants of Choice Satisfaction in a High-Involvement Product Choice, in: Journal of Management and Marketing Research, Vol. 19, pp. 1–19.
- Fassnacht, M./ Unterhuber S. (2015): Cross-Channel Pricing: What We Know and What We Need to Know, in: International Journal of Business Research, Vol. 15, Nr. 2, pp. 39–60
- Kluge, P.N./Fassnacht, M. (2015): Selling Luxury Goods Online: Effects of Online Accessibility and Price Display, in: International Journal of Retail and Distribution Management, Vol. 43, No. 10/11, pp. 1065–1082
- Fassnacht, M./Szajna, M. (2014): Shoppen, ohne einzukaufen - Der Trend Showrooming im Einzelhandel, in: Gössinger, R./Zäpfel, G. (Hrsg.): Management integrativer Leistungserstellung, Festschrift für Hans Corsten, Betriebswirtschaftliche Schriften Band 168, Berlin: Duncker & Humblot, S. 287–304.
- Goetz, D. M./Fassnacht, M./Rumpf, K. (2014): Extending Downward is Not Always Bad: Parent Brand Evaluations After Brand Extension to Higher and Lower Price and Quality Levels, in: Journal of Brand Management, Vol. 21, No. 4, pp. 303–324.
- Simon, C./Brexendorf, T. O./Fassnacht, M. (2013): Creating Online Brand Experience on Facebook, in: Marketing Review St. Gallen, Vol. 30, No. 6, pp. 50–59.
- Möller, S./Ciuchita, R./Mahr, D./Oderkerken-Schröder, G./Fassnacht, M. (2013): Uncovering Collaborative Value Creation Patterns and Establishing Corresponding Customer Roles, in: Journal of Service Research, Vol. 16, No. 4, pp. 471–487.
- Fassnacht, M./El Husseini, S. (2013): EDLP vs. Hi-Lo Pricing Strategies in Retailing – A State of the Art Article, in: Journal of Business Economics (früher: Zeitschrift für Betriebswirtschaft), Vol. 83, No. 3, S. 259–289.
- Fassnacht, M./Kluge, P.N./Mohr, H. (2013): Pricing Luxury Brands: Specificities, Conceptualization, and Performance Impact, in: Marketing ZFP – Journal of Research and Management, Vol. 35, No. 2, pp. 104–117.
- Kluge, P.N./Königsfeld, J.A./Fassnacht, M./Mitschke, F. (2013): Luxury Web Atmospherics: An Examination of Homepage Design, in: International Journal of Retailing & Distribution Management, Vol. 21, No. 11/12, pp. 901–916.
- Simon, H./Zatta, D./Fassnacht, M. (2013): Price Management, II. Strumenti operative e applicazioni settoriali [Italian Version], Milano: FrancoAngeli.
- Simon, H./Zatta, D./Fassnacht, M. (2013): Price Management. I. Strategia, analisi e determinazione del prezzo [Italian Version], Milano: FrancoAngeli.
