= Simon-Kucher =

Consulting company in Germany

- Company type: Partnership
- Industry: Management consulting
- Founded: 1985
- Number of locations: 46 offices, 31 countries
- Area served: Worldwide
- Key people: Co-CEOs: Dr. Gunnar Clausen, Joerg Kruetten
- Products: Management consulting services
- Website: www.simon-kucher.com

Simon-Kucher is a global strategy consulting firm with offices in 30+ countries with 46 offices and a team of more than 2,000 employees. Founded in 1985, the firm focuses on growth strategy, marketing, pricing, and sales.

== Background ==
Simon-Kucher was founded by Hermann Simon and his doctoral students, Eckhard Kucher and Karl-Heinz Sebastian, in Bonn in 1985. At the time, Simon was a professor at the University of Bielefeld.

In 1996, Simon-Kucher became the first independent German consultancy to establish a subsidiary abroad when the firm opened an office in Cambridge, Massachusetts. This was the beginning of Simon-Kucher's international expansion with new offices opening annually, starting with Paris, Zurich, Tokyo, and Munich. The firm is led by a board, consisting of nine partners from different countries and offices. Dr. Gunnar Clausen and Joerg Kruetten are the company's Co-CEOs since 1 January 2025. Dr. Andreas von der Gathen and Mark Billige were Co-CEOs from 2020 to 2024. Dr. Georg Tacke was CEO since 2009, when Hermann Simon stepped down as board chairman, a position that he had held since 1995.
