= Tapered integration =

Term from organization theory

Tapered integration is a term from organization theory that refers to a mix of vertical integration and market exchange. Upstream, a producer might manufacture some of the input itself and buy the remaining portion from independent firms. Downstream, the manufacturer might sell a portion of its output through an in-house sales force and use independent sales forces to sell the remainder.

It is not documented when the term tapered integration was first used, though it can be found in law journals such as the Yale Law Journal as early as the 1950s, the first known use in academia being a case study by William King Norris.

== Examples ==
Examples for tapered integration are (1) Tim Hortons owning some of its retail outlets but also using franchising, (2) Coca-Cola and Pepsi both having integrated bottling subsidiaries while also relying on independent bottlers for production and distribution in some markets, or (3) BMW which uses both in-house market research from its Corporate Center Development and external market research from independent, specialized firms.

== Advantages/Disadvantages ==
=== Advantages ===
- Expansion of input channels without significant capital outlays
- Use of internal cost information to negotiate contracts with market firms
- Motivation tool for both internal division and market firms
- Protection against holdup risk

=== Disadvantages ===
- Both internal and external production may stay below minimum eff. scale
- coordination and monitoring problems
- Inefficient internal divisions may be kept when not efficient

== Literature ==
- Porter, M. E. (1998). Competitive strategy: Techniques for analyzing competitors and industries. 2nd edition, New York: The Free Press.
- Besanko, D., Dranove, D., Shanley, M., Schaefer, S. (2013). Economics of Strategy. 6th edition, Hoboken, NJ: Wiley.
