= Hydrocarbon exploration and licensing policy, 2016 =

Hydrocarbon exploration and licensing policy, 2016 is the exploration and production policy of the Government of India in the hydrocarbon sector. The government adopted the policy in March 2016 in place of the New Exploration Licensing Policy 1997.

== Main features of the policy ==
- Uniform license for exploration and production of all forms of hydrocarbon such as coal bed methane, shale gas and oil, tight gas and gas hydrates.
- An open acreage policy that allows companies to select the exploration blocks on their own without waiting for the formal bidding round from the government.
- Easy to administer revenue sharing model as the government needs to audit only the production and revenue of companies (not costs). The subjective criterion of cost recovery has ended.
- Marketing and pricing freedom for the crude oil and natural gas produced.
