= New Exploration Licensing Policy =

New Exploration Licensing Policy (NELP) was conceptualised by the Government of India, during 1997-98 to provide an equal platform to both Public and Private sector companies in exploration and production of hydrocarbons with Directorate General of Hydrocarbons (DGH) as a nodal agency for its implementation. It was introduced to boost the production of oil and natural gas and providing level playing field for both public and private players.

== Introduction ==
New Exploration Licensing Policy (NELP) was conceptualised by Amit B Singh after request by the Government of India, during 1997-98 to provide an equal platform to both Public and Private sector companies in exploration and production of hydrocarbons with Directorate General of Hydrocarbons (DGH) as a nodal agency for its implementation. India has an estimated sedimentary area of 3.14 million km^{2}. consisting of 26 sedimentary basins, of which, 57% (1.79 million km^{2}.) area is in deepwater and remaining 43% (1.35 million km^{2}.) area is in onland and shallow offshore. At present 1.06 million km^{2} area is held under Petroleum Exploration Licenses in 18 basins by national oil companies viz. Oil and Natural Gas Corporation Limited (ONGC), OIL India Limited (OIL) and Private/Joint Venture companies. Before implementation of the New Exploration Licensing Policy (NELP) in 1999, a mere 11% of Indian sedimentary basins were under exploration, which has now increased extensively over the years.

Recently, bidding process was completed in NELP-IX. Till 2010, 8 rounds of NELP have been completed. 400 PSC’s have been signed, out of which 168 are in operation. The private / JV companies contribute about 46% of gas and 16% oil to the national Oil & Gas production. The Mangala fields in Rajasthan and Krishna-Godavari Basins have been the major source for oil and gas fields.

== History ==
New Exploration Licensing Policy (NELP) was formulated by the Government of India, during 1997-98 to provide level playing field for all the investors and providing several concessions and incentives to both Public and Private sector companies in exploration and production of hydrocarbons with Directorate General of Hydrocarbons (DGH) acting as a nodal agency for its implementation.

== Need for NELP ==
India is the fifth largest consumer of primary energy and the third largest consumer of oil in the Asia–Pacific region after China and Japan. Due to high economic growth, there is a huge need for enhancing supply of energy resources. Also, dependence on imported petroleum continues to grow and is ultimately impacting the country’s long term growth. Of the 26 sedimentary basins identified in India, so far, only 20% of the total area has been well explored. The remaining areas need to be extensively explored with the best of technologies, with special emphasis on the frontier basins. With the introduction of the New Exploration Licensing Policy (NELP), the introduction of much-needed capital and state-of-the-art technology to explore the sector could be made possible. With the policies and regulations being some of the most transparent in the world, the NELP has revived a healthy spirit of competition between National Oil Companies and private and multinational companies. The development of the exploration sector has been significantly boosted through this policy, which brought major liberalization in the sector and created pathways for private and foreign investment, where 100% Foreign Direct Investment (FDI) is allowed. Under NELP, which became effective in February 1999, the process of competitive bidding is followed wherein acreages are offered to the participating companies. By mid-2012, the ninth round of bidding has been concluded along with fourth round for Coal Bed Methane (CBM) blocks. The Government of India offered the highest ever number of 70 oil & gas exploration blocks covering an area of about 1,63,535 km². and also making a parallel offer of 10 blocks under the fourth round of Coal Bed Methane Policy (CBM-IV) for exploration and production of Coal Bed Methane. The Government of India launched the Ninth round of offers for exploration acreages, NELP IX on 15 October 2010.

== NELP-I ==
Under the First round of New Exploration Licensing Policy, bids were invited by the Government of India on 8 January 1999 for 48 blocks for exploration of oil and natural gas. Of these, 12 blocks were deepwater (beyond 400m isobath), 26 shallow offshore and 10 were onshore blocks. The PSC’s were signed for 24 exploration blocks comprising 7 deepwater, 16 shallow offshore and 1 onshore. At present, 11 exploration blocks are under operation and 13 blocks have been relinquished.

== NELP-II ==
Under the second round of New Exploration Licensing Policy, bids were invited by the Government of India 15 December 2000 for 25 blocks for exploration of oil and natural gas. Of these, 8 blocks were deepwater (beyond 400m isobath), 8 shallow offshore and 9 were onland blocks. The PSC’s were signed for 23 exploration blocks comprising 8 deepwater, 8 shallow offshore and 7 onland. At present, 4 exploration blocks are under operation and 19 blocks have been relinquished.

== NELP-III ==
Under the third round of New Exploration Licensing Policy, bids were invited by the Government of India on 27 March 2002 for 27 blocks for exploration of oil and natural gas. Of these, 9 blocks were deepwater (beyond 400m isobath), 7 shallow offshore and 11 were onland blocks The PSC’s were signed for 23 exploration blocks comprising 9 deepwater, 6 shallow offshore and 8 onland. The exploration activities are going on in 19 awarded blocks and 4 blocks had been relinquished.

== NELP-IV ==
Under the Fourth round of New Exploration Licensing Policy, bids were invited by the Government of India on 8 May 2003 for 24 blocks for exploration of oil and natural gas. Of these, 12 blocks were deepwater (beyond 400m isobath), 1 shallow offshore and 11 were onland blocks. The PSC’s were signed for 20 exploration blocks. At present 19 exploration blocks are operating, comprising 9 deepwater and 10 onland. The exploration activities are going on in all the 19 awarded blocks.

== NELP-V ==
Under the Fifth round of New Exploration Licensing Policy, bids were invited by the Government of India for 20 blocks for exploration of oil and natural gas. The Government received 69 bids from 48 global and domestic majors, including BP (formerly British Petroleum) and Reliance Industries, to participate in the oil exploration activity under the fifth round for 20 oil exploration blocks. Of these, 6 blocks were deepwater (beyond 400m isobath), 2 shallow offshore and 12 were onland blocks. The largest number of bids received were from Reliance which had bid for 12 of the 20 blocks, followed by ONGC which had bid for 10 and Oil India Ltd which put in a bid for six blocks.

The PSC’s were signed for all 20 exploration blocks. The exploration activity is going on in all the 20 awarded blocks. As of 2012, ENI is still awaiting Drilling permission from the department of space due to the block’s proximity to a rocket launch zone (in Andaman and Nicobar Islands) of Isro.

== NELP-VI ==
A total of fifty five blocks (55) were offered during the NELP VI round for exploration of oil and natural gas in 16 prospective sedimentary basins consists of 25 Onland, 6 Shallow Water and 24 Deep Water blocks. 165 bids from 68 E&P companies (36 foreign and 32 Indian) had participated in the bidding process as consortium/ individually. The PSC’s were signed for 52 exploration blocks comprising 21 deepwater, 6 shallow water and 25 onland. The exploration activities are going on in all the 52 awarded blocks.

== NELP-VII ==
A total of fifty Seven blocks (57) were offered during the NELP VII round for exploration of oil and natural gas in 18 prospective sedimentary basins consists of 29 Onland, 9 Shallow Water and 19 Deep Water blocks. On 22 December 2008 Contracts were signed for 41 blocks out of which 11 blocks in Deep Water, 7 blocks in Shallow Water and 23 Onland blocks.

== NELP-VIII ==
Under the eighth round of New Exploration Licensing Policy (NELP-VIII), Government has offered 31 production sharing contracts on 30 June 2010. There are 8 deepwater blocks, 11 shallow water blocks and 12 onland blocks which are in the states of Assam (2), Gujarat (8), Madhya Pradesh (1) and Manipur (1).

== NELP-IX ==
A total of 33 exploration blocks were offered during the bidding process. State-owned Oil and Natural Gas Corp (ONGC) successfully bid for 10 of the 33 oil and gas exploration blocks, Oil India Ltd (OIL) bid for as many as 29 blocks and managed to get 10. Reliance Industries bid for two deep-sea blocks in the Andaman Basin in the Bay of Bengal and four onshore blocks in Rajasthan and Gujarat.

== Chronology OF Exploration and Production Activities in India ==
India began its journey into Oil Exploration and Production just seven years after the famous ‘Drake Well’, which heralded the beginning of the Petroleum era, which was drilled in Titus Ville, Pennsylvania, USA (1859). The oil reserves were located in the dense jungles, swamps, damp and undulated terrain of Brahmaputra Valley, Assam in the mid-19th century. The first well was drilled by Mr.Goodenough of Mckillop, Stewart and Co.; in Upper Assam in 1866 following a hint of oil show detected by the fleet of elephants carrying logs.

Year	Activity
1889	W.L.Lake of Assam Railway and Trading Co. (AR & T Co) commenced Digboi Well No-1. The name “Digboi” was arrived since Lake used to urge his men “Dig boy, dig” and hence the name was coined. This discovery in Upper Assam was a milestone in the history of oil.
1899	A new company Assam Oil Company (AOC) was set up by AR&T and a small refinery at Margharita (Upper Assam) with a capacity of 500 bbl/d (79 m^{3}/d) was started to refine the Digboi-oil.
1901	Digboi refinery was commissioned.
1911	Burmah Oil Company (BOC) enters into the Indian market.
1921	Burmah Oil Company (BOC) takes over Assam Oil Company (AOC).
1925	India’s first attempt to use geophysics with a Torsion balance survey in its search for oil.
1937-39	Seismic surveys were initiated in and a major ‘High’ was located at Nahorkatiya in Assam The successful outcome of NHK-1 was a triumphant vindication of the geophysical methods of exploration.
1937-39	Nahorkatiya triggered a new wave of enthusiasm in the search for oil in the country and became the forerunner of discoveries not only in Assam basin but also in other basins.
1948	Geological Survey of India (GSI) started geophysical surveys in Cambay area.
1956	AOC discovers the Moran oil field
1956	Oil & Natural Gas Commission (ONGC) was established.
1959	Under an act of parliament, ONGC becomes autonomous body.
1959	Oil India Private Ltd (OIL) incorporated and registered as a Rupee Company.
1960	Oil struck at Ankleswar in Gujarat and Rudrasagar in Assam.
1961	GOI and BOC become equal partners in OIL.
1962	The first public sector refinery comes up at Guwahati.
1963	World’s first crude oil conditioning plant commissioned at Nahorkatiya. India’s first deviated well NHK122 drilled by OIL.
1963	ONGC started offshore seismic surveys in Gulf of Cambay.
1968	Oil discovered in Geleki by ONGC.
1968	OIL commissioned the 1158 km oil pipeline to Guwahati and Barauni refineries.
1970	India’s first offshore well spudded in the Gulf of Cambay.
1974	Drillship strikes oil in Bombay High.
1974	Bombay High discovered.
1981	First well spudded in Godavari offshore.
1981	OIL becomes a Government of India enterprise.
1983-84	Gas struck at Razole, Andhra Pradesh and Gotaru, Rajasthan.
1984	First Early Production system (EPS) commences in Gujarat.
1984	Gas struck at Gotaru in Rajasthan by ONGC.
1984-85	Oil struck in Kutch offshore, Godavari offshore and Changmaigam in Assam.
1986-87	Oil struck in the Tapti offshore area and Namti structure (Assam) by ONGC.
1988-89	Commercial gas finds in Rajasthan by OIL, Nada field in Gujarat discovered.
1989-90	South Heera field discovered in Mumbai offshore.
1998	New Exploration Licensing Policy (NELP) launched and 48 Exploration blocks offered under round-I.
2000	Second round of New Exploration Licensing Policy launched and 25 Exploration blocks offered.
2002	Third round of New Exploration Licensing Policy launched and 27 Exploration blocks offered.
2003	Fourth round of New Exploration Licensing Policy launched and 24 Exploration blocks offered.
2005	Fifth round of New Exploration Licensing Policy launched and 20 Exploration blocks offered.
2006	Sixth round of New Exploration Licensing Policy launched and 55 Exploration blocks offered.
2007	Seventh round of New Exploration Licensing Policy launched and 57 Exploration blocks offered
2010	Eighth round of New Exploration Licensing Policy offered and 31 blocks offered.

== See also ==
Hydrocarbon exploration and licensing policy, 2016
