= Market foreclosure =

Market foreclosure or vertical foreclosure, is the production limitation put on a producing organisation if either it is denied access to a supplier (upstream foreclosure), or it is denied access to a downstream buyer (downstream foreclosure). A supplier or intermediary in a supply chain could acquire this form of market power against competitors through means of mergers and acquisitions. This amalgamation of suppliers and customers demonstrates vertical integration along a value chain with various strategic and efficiency benefits including elimination of successive monopoly markups and lowering transaction costs.

== Examples ==
The television industry allows for certain insight when considering vertical integration due to the level of differentiating aspects the market provides. Within this industry, media markets have experienced various occasions in which integrated operators attempt to deter rival program services by means of increasing barriers to entry. Transaction costs being one of these barriers, plays an overwhelming role, effectively guaranteeing networks that have vertically integrated the upper hand in the market due to ability of self production while simultaneously excluding rival program services.

Gasoline production provides another example of supply restraints and competitive dominance by means of vertical integration. Market foreclosure plays a consistent role in the dynamics of the gasoline industry and more specifically with large refineries with significant capabilities of production. Researchers have estimated that US wholesale gasoline prices have been raised by 0.2 to 0.6 cents per gallon due to the market power wielded by vertically integrated players in the industry.

== Vertical integration without market foreclosure ==
Although generally the trend with vertical integration, the outcome does not always end in a foreclosed market. Researchers reviewing plant and market data in the US cement and concrete industries over a 34-year span, found that vertical integration led to lower prices and higher quantities for consumers. Presumably, this was because of production efficiencies from integration which proved contrary to what one would otherwise expect in a market experiencing foreclosure. Similarly, a review of exclusive dealing practices in the Chicago beer market found evidence that contradicts the effects that is market foreclosure stemming from vertical integration. Research by John Asker conveyed evidence, not unlike the cement and concrete industries; that beer sales weren't diminishing for exclusive markets relative to non-exclusive markets.

== See also ==
- Vertical integration
- Exclusive dealing
- Value chain
- Barriers to entry
