= European Journal of International Management =

The European Journal of International Management (EJIM) is a collaborative, scholarly, and peer-reviewed academic journal dealing with issues ranging from international business and management.

It is indexed in Scopus and Web of Science with Clarivate SSCI impact factor of 1.8 (2022).
