= Ulvac =

Japanese company in vacuum equipment

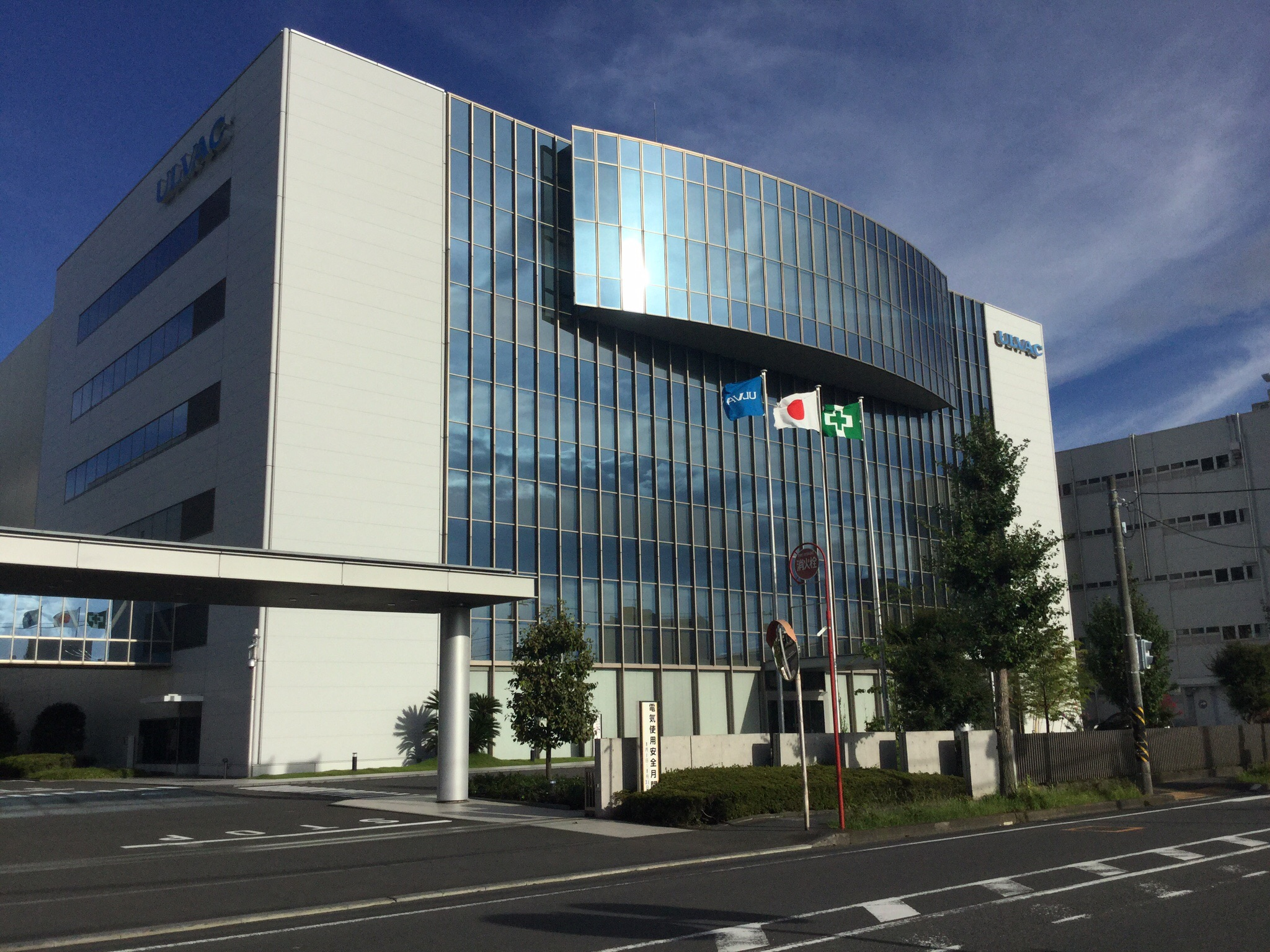
- Headquarter office
- Native name: アルバック
- Type: Public
- Traded as: TYO: 6728
- ISIN: JP3126190002
- Founded: 1952
- Headquarters: Chigasaki, Kanagawa, Japan
- Area served: Worldwide
- Website: ulvac.co.jp

ULVAC is a Japanese multinational corporation, specializing in vacuum equipment and related products, headquartered in Chigasaki, Kanagawa, Japan.

== History ==
In 1952, the company was established as Japan Vacuum Engineering Co. Ltd, initially focusing on importing and selling various vacuum equipment. In 1973, the company ventured into the vacuum metallurgy business. In 2001, it was renamed to ULVAC, Inc.

ULVAC, Inc has been listed on the First Section of the Tokyo Stock Exchange since April 2004. Ulvac has sales locations in USA, Germany, Poland, Russia, Turkey, India, Thailand, Malaysia, Singapore, Taiwan, Korea and China.

The company's products and services are used in industries, including electronics, semiconductors, manufacturing, and healthcare.
