= Schwank (company) =

German heating system supplier

- Type: Private
- Industry: Building services engineering
- Founded: 1933
- Founder: Günther Schwank
- Headquarters: Cologne, Germany
- Key people: Oliver Schwank
- Number of employees: about 350 (2023)
- Website: schwank.co.uk

Schwank is a group of companies headquartered in Cologne, Germany. The group operates internationally and manufactures and distributes heating, cooling and ventilation (HVAC) systems for industrial and commercial applications.

According to reports in German media sources, including Wirtschaftswoche, Schwank is considered the global market leader in industrial infrared heating systems, having a market share around 19% and is therefore considered a hidden champion.

== Overview ==
Schwank develops and produces infrared heating systems and related equipment for industrial buildings. Its product range includes electric and gas-fired infrared heaters, heat recovery systems, ventilation systems and heat pumps, including high intensity heaters, tube heaters, electric heaters, warm air heaters, heat exchangers, air handling units, air curtains and HVLS fans. These systems are used in factories, warehouses, distribution centres, and sports venues where large indoor areas require heating. The company distributes its products internationally and is active in more than 40 countries.

== History ==
Schwank was founded in 1933 by engineer Günther Schwank in Fegersheim, Alsace. The company initially produced gas stoves for commercial kitchens. In 1939, Günther Schwank developed and patented the worldwide first ceramic based gas-infrared heater. The company moved production to Hamburg in 1951, and in the mid-1950s, the company relocated to Cologne, where its main production site has since been located.

In the 1970s, Bernd Schwank took over the company. During the following years, Schwank established sales activities in Canada, France, the Netherlands, Austria, and the United Kingdom. In 1981, Schwank acquired Perfection Industries to establish itself in the United States.

In 2002, the company equipped the Santiago Bernabéu Stadium in Madrid with heating units. In 2004, Oliver Schwank joined as the CEO, keeping the company in family hands.

During the early 2020s, the company expanded its product range to include heat pumps and ventilation systems. Schwank also developed the world’s first industrial hydrogen heating system.

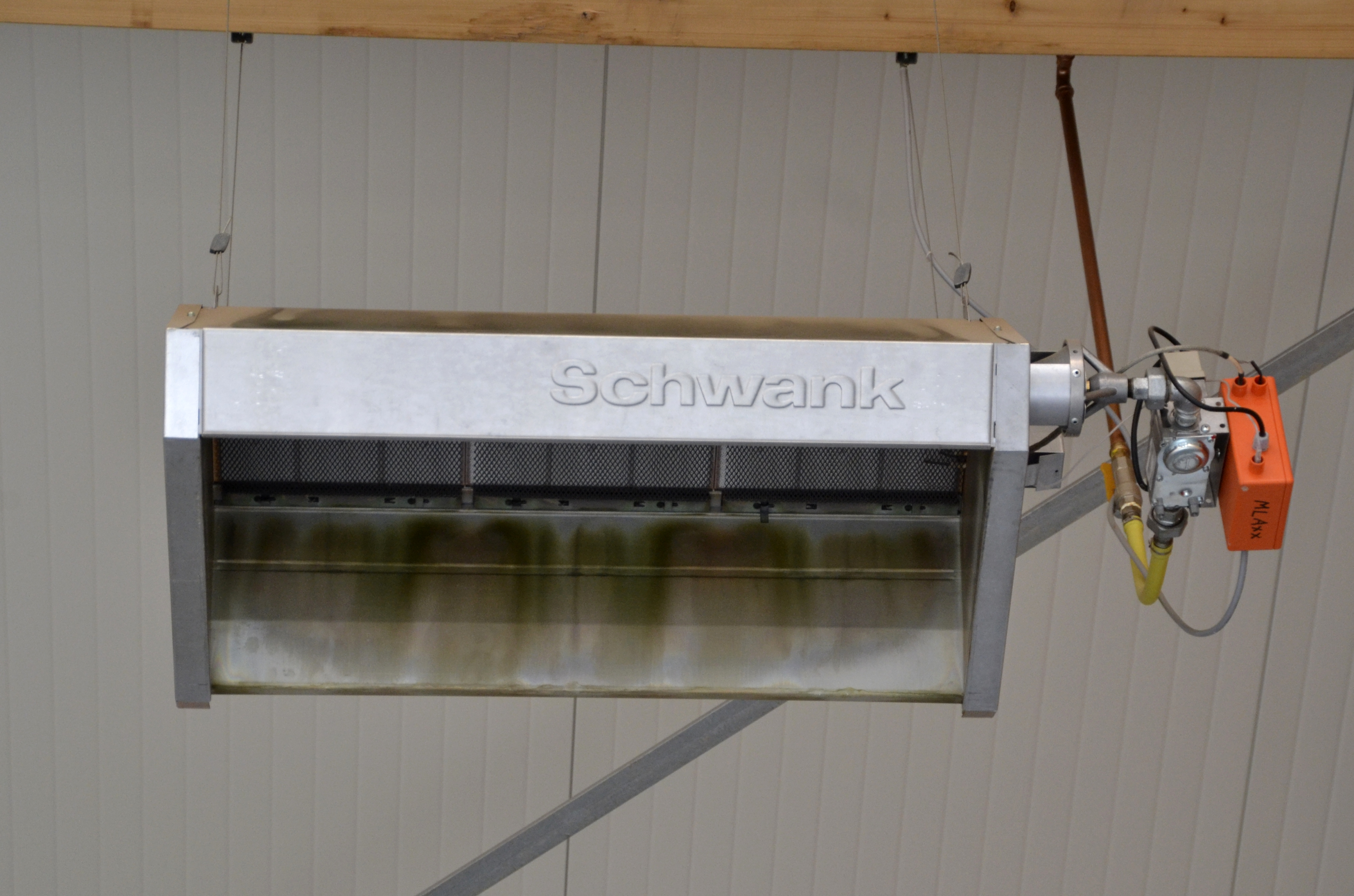
Schwank Infrared High Intensity Heater

In 2025, Schwank presented new products including the electric infrared heater series eSchwank.

== Corporate structure ==
Schwank is a family-owned company headquartered in Cologne, Germany. The company operates internationally through subsidiaries and offices in Europe, North America, and Asia, and maintains manufacturing sites in Germany, the United States, Canada, and China.

The company is managed by Oliver Schwank. In 2023, the company employed about 350 people worldwide, including around 190 in Germany.
