= Hermann Simon (business manager) =

German author and businessperson (born 1947)

- Born: February 10, 1947 (age 79); Hasborn, Germany
- Education: University of Cologne; University of Bonn
- Occupation: Author

Hermann Simon (born 10 February 1947) is a German author and businessperson. He is chairman of Simon-Kucher, a strategy and marketing consultancy. He is a strategy, marketing and pricing consultant. An ongoing online German-language survey voted him the second-most influential management thinker. Simon has authored numerous books and writes articles for international newspapers and business magazines. He is also known for coining the term Servicewüste.

== Short biography ==
- 1947 Born in Hasborn/Eifel, Germany
- 1966 High School leaving A-levels certificate, Cusanus High School, Wittlich
- 1967-1969 German Air Force, fighter bomber squadron 33, reserve officer
- 1969-1973 Studies of economics and business administration in Cologne and Bonn
- 1974-1979 Ph.D. and qualification as a university professor under Horst Albach in Bonn
- 1979-1989 Professor at the University of Bielefeld
- 1989-1995 Professor at the University of Mainz
- 1983-2002 Various guest professorships and visiting researcher positions: Massachusetts Institute of Technology (1978/79), Vienna Institute for Advanced Studies (1979), Keio University in Tokyo (1983), Stanford University (1984), INSEAD in Fontainebleau (1980–1985), Harvard Business School (1988/89), London Business School (1991-2002)
- 1985-1988 Director, USW The German Management Institute, Schloss Gracht/Cologne
- 1985 Founded the company Simon-Kucher
- 1995-2009 CEO of Simon - Kucher & Partners Strategy & Marketing Consultants
- Since 2009 Chairman of Simon - Kucher & Partners Strategy & Marketing Consultants

== Career ==
Simon's career spans three professions in his work as a management consultant, business professor, and author. His books have been translated into 25 languages and are widely read among managers. An ongoing online survey votes him a most-influential management thinker, second only to Peter Drucker. Simon was inducted into the Thinkers50 Hall of Fame in 2019.

=== Management consultant ===
He was CEO of Simon-Kucher strategy and marketing consultants from 1995 until 2009. His consulting firm focuses on strategy, marketing, pricing and sales. Bloomberg BusinessWeek described Simon-Kucher & Partners as a "world leader in giving advice to companies on how to price their products", and The Economist wrote that "Simon-Kucher is the world's leading pricing consultancy".

=== Author ===
Simon's books are widely read among managers and have been translated into 25 languages. In March 2011, Simon and co-author Martin Fassnacht were awarded the 2010 Georg-Bergler-Prize for Preismanagement. Carrying with it a €20000 prize, this is the most highly endowed award for European marketing textbooks.

In 2006, Simon published Manage for Profit, Not for Market Share, which takes a critical look at the widespread focus on volume and market share and calls for a conscious shift of focus towards profit.

Simon's most well-known publications include Think (2004), Power Pricing (1997), Hidden Champions (1996), Hidden Champions of the 21st Century (2009) and Preismanagement (3rd edition 2009). Additional publications include Das große Handbuch der Strategieinstrumente (2002), Das große Handbuch der Strategiekonzepte (2000) and Simon for Managers (2000).

Simon has coined a number of phrases which are commonly used in management theory and practice, including "price management", "hidden champions", "Servicewüste" and "investor marketing". Since 1988, Simon has regularly authored a column for the German monthly Manager Magazin. He is a member of the editorial boards of numerous business journals, including the International Journal of Research in Marketing, Management Science, Recherche et Applications en Marketing, Décisions Marketing, European Management Journal and several German journals.

== Works ==
=== Books ===
- Simon, Hermann (2013). Preisheiten. Alles was Sie über Preise wissen müssen. Campus Verlag. ISBN 978-3-593-39910-2.
- Simon, Hermann (2012). Hidden Champions. Aufbruch nach Globalia. Campus Verlag. ISBN 978-3-593-39714-6.
- Simon, Hermann (2011). Die Wirtschaftstrends der Zukunft. Campus Verlag. ISBN 978-3-593-39363-6.
- Simon, Hermann (2009). Beat the crisis. 33 Quick solutions for Your Company. Springer. ISBN 978-1-4419-0822-3.
- Simon, Hermann (2009). Hidden Champions of the 21st century. Springer.
- Simon, Hermann (2009). Preismanagement. Analyse, Strategie, Umsetzung (3rd ed.). Gabler Wiesbaden.
- Simon, Hermann (2006). Bilstein, Frank; Luby, Frank: Manage for Profit, not for Market Share. A Guide to Greater Profits in Highly Contested Markets. Harvard Business School Press. ISBN 1-59139-526-7.
- Simon, Hermann (2004). Think - Strategische Unternehmensführung statt Kurzfrist-Denken. Campus.
- Simon, Hermann (2003). Strategie im Wettbewerb. 50 handfeste Aussagen zur wirksamen Unternehmensführung. FAZ-Buch.
- Simon, Hermann (2002). von der Gathen, Andreas: Das große Handbuch der Strategieinstrumente. Campus.
- Simon, Hermann (2000). Das große Handbuch der Strategiekonzepte. Campus.
- Simon, Hermann; Dolan, Robert J. (1996). Power Pricing. How Managing Price Transforms the Bottom Line. The Free Press. ISBN 0-684-83443-X. (published in 14 languages)
- Simon, Hermann (1996). Hidden Champions. Lessons from 500 of the world's best unknown companies. Harvard Business School Press. ISBN 0-87584-652-1. (published in 15 languages)
- Simon, Hermann (1991). Simon für Manager. Econ Verlag. ISBN 0-8342-0877-6.

=== Selected articles ===
- Simon, Hermann (1997). "Hysteresis in Marketing - A New Phenomenon?". Sloan Management Review. 38 (3): 39–49.
- Simon, Hermann (1992). "Pricing Opportunities and How to Exploit Them". Sloan Management Review. 33: 55–65.
- Simon, Hermann (1992). "Lessons from Germany's Midsize Giants". Harvard Business Review. 70: 115–123.
- Simon, Hermann; Sebastian, Karl-Heinz (1987). "Diffusion und Advertising: The German Telephone Campaign". Management Science. 33 (April 1987): 451–46. doi:10.1287/mnsc.33.4.451.
- Simon, Hermann (1982). "PRICESTRAT. An Applied Strategic Pricing Model for Non-Durables". TIMS-Studies in the Management Sciences. 17.
- Simon, Hermann (1982). "ADPULS. An Advertising Model with Wearout and Pulsation". Journal of Marketing Research. 19 (August 1982): 352–363. doi:10.2307/3151569. JSTOR 3151569.
- Simon, Hermann; Bachem, A. (1981). "Product Positioning Model with Costs and Prices". European Journal of Operational Research. 7 (4): 362–370. doi:10.1016/0377-2217(81)90094-1.
- Simon, Hermann (1979). "Dynamics of Price Elasticity and Brand Life Cycles: An Empirical Study". Journal of Marketing Research. 16 (November 1979): 439–452. doi:10.2307/3150805. JSTOR 3150805.
- Simon, Hermann (1978). "An Analytical Investigation of Kotler's Competitive Simulation Model". Management Science. 24 (October 1978): 1462–1473. doi:10.1287/mnsc.24.14.1462.

=== Other ===
- Simon, Hermann (November 10, 2010). "Small businesses deserve more attention from G20 Summit". The Korea Times. Archived from the original on May 8, 2016.
- "Consultant's group hunts hidden champion". Financial Times. September 5, 2010.
- "Mittelstand still limited in UK". Financial Times. September 26, 2010.
- "Mittel-management: Germany's midsized companies have a lot to teach the world". The Economist. November 25, 2010.
- "Hermann Simon". YouTube.
- "CNN TV Spot Invest Seoul - Prof. Hermann Simon". CNN TV Spot. 7 December 2010. Archived from the original on 2021-12-13.
