= List of business schools in Europe =

This is a list of business schools in Europe. This list should not include schools that teach business alongside other subjects, i.e., a university that has a business curriculum should not be listed here as a business school. Those schools that have articles (i.e., are notable) are accepted for inclusion without a supporting citation; those schools that do not have articles (i.e., red links) must have associated citations that reliably support the existence and focus of the school. Triple accreditation in management education is the combined accreditation of the three major accreditation bodies: the Association to Advance Collegiate Schools of Business (AACSB) based in the United States, the Association of MBAs (AMBA) based in the United Kingdom, and the EFMD Quality Improvement System (EQUIS) by the European Foundation for Management Development (EFMD) based in Belgium. More than 120 business schools worldwide, or about 1% of all business schools, are triple-accredited.

Country	School	City	Accreditation	FT Rank (2024)
Austria	Alpen-Adria-Universität Klagenfurt Faculty of Management, Economics & Law	Klagenfurt	AACSB	
Austria	FHWien of WKW, University of Applied Sciences for Management & Communication	Vienna		
Austria	Lauder Business School	Vienna		
Austria	MCI Management Center Innsbruck	Innsbruck	AACSB	
Austria	WU Executive Academy, Vienna University of Economics and Business	Vienna	Triple accreditation	46
Belgium	Antwerp Management School	Antwerp	Triple accreditation	57
Belgium	Faculty of Business and Economics, University of Antwerp	Antwerp	AACSB, EQUIS	85
Belgium	Ghent University Faculty of Economics and Business Administration	Ghent	AACSB	
Belgium	HEC Liège Management School	Liège	AACSB	
Belgium	ICHEC Brussels Management School	Brussels	AACSB	
Belgium	KU Leuven Faculty of Economics and Business	Leuven	EQUIS	
Belgium	Louvain School of Management, UCLouvain	Louvain-la-Neuve	EQUIS	67
Belgium	Solvay Brussels School of Economics and Management, Université Libre de Bruxelles	Brussels	AMBA	78
Belgium	United Business Institutes	Brussels		
Belgium	Vlerick Business School	Ghent, Leuven, Brussels	Triple accreditation	33
Bosnia and Herzegovina	Sarajevo Graduate School of Business	Sarajevo		
Bosnia and Herzegovina	University of Sarajevo School of Economics and Business	Sarajevo	AACSB	
Bulgaria	Sofia University St. Kliment Ohridski, Faculty of Economics and Business Administration	Sofia	AMBA	
Bulgaria	D. A. Tsenov Academy of Economics	Svishtov		
Bulgaria	University of Economics Varna	Varna		
Bulgaria	University of National and World Economy	Sofia		
Bulgaria	Varna University of Management	Varna		
Bulgaria	International Business School, Botevgrad	Botevgrad		
Croatia	Cotrugli Business School	Zagreb	AMBA	
Croatia	University of Zagreb Faculty of Economics and Business	Zagreb	Triple accreditation	
Croatia	Zagreb School of Economics and Management	Zagreb	AACSB	
Cyprus	Cyprus Institute of Marketing			
Cyprus	Cyprus International Institute of Management			
Cyprus	University of Cyprus School of Economics and Management	Nicosia	AACSB	
Czech Republic	Prague University of Economics and Business Faculty of Business Administration	Prague	Triple accreditation	49
Czech Republic	The University of Finance and Administration	Prague		
Denmark	Aarhus University, School of Business and Social Sciences (Aarhus BSS)	Aarhus	Triple accreditation	
Denmark	AVT Business School		AMBA	
Denmark	Copenhagen Business School	Copenhagen	Triple accreditation	48
Denmark	DTU Executive School of Business, Technical University of Denmark	Kongens Lyngby	AMBA	
Denmark	International Business School of Scandinavia	Copenhagen		
Estonia	Estonian Business School	Tallinn		
Finland	Aalto University School of Business, Aalto University	Espoo, Mikkeli	Triple accreditation	45
Finland	Åbo Akademi University School of Business and Economics	Turku	AACSB	
Finland	Hanken School of Economics	Helsinki, Vaasa	Triple accreditation	73
Finland	University of Jyväskylä School of Business and Economics	Jyväskylä	AACSB, AMBA	
Finland	LUT School of Business and Management, LUT University	Lappeenranta	AACSB	
Finland	Oulu Business School, University of Oulu	Oulu	AACSB	
Finland	Turku School of Economics, University of Turku	Turku	AACSB	
France	Audencia Business School	Nantes	Triple accreditation	30
France	Brest Business School	Brest	AACSB	
France	Burgundy School of Business (BSB)	Dijon, Lyon, Paris	Triple accreditation	71
France	CNAM International Institute of Management		AMBA	
France	École des Ponts Business School	Paris	AMBA	
France	École supérieure de commerce de Pau	Pau		
France	EDHEC Business School	Lille, Nice, Paris	Triple accreditation	7
France	EMLV Business School, Leonardo Da Vinci University		AACSB, AMBA	99
France	EM Lyon Business School	Lyon, Paris	Triple accreditation	11
France	EM Normandie Business School	Caen, Le Havre, Paris	Triple accreditation	
France	EM Strasbourg Business School	Strasbourg	Triple accreditation	77
France	ESC Clermont Business School	Clermont-Ferrand	AACSB, AMBA	87
France	ESC Rennes School of Business	Rennes	Triple accreditation	56
France	ESCE International Business School (OMNES Education, formerly INSEEC)	Paris, Lyon		
France	ESCP Business School	Paris	AACSB, EQUIS	5
France	ESDES School of Business and Management, Catholic University of Lyon	Lyon	AACSB	91
France	ESSCA	Angers, Boulogne-Billancourt, Paris, Aix-en-Provence, Lyon, Bordeaux, Cholet	Triple accreditation	86
France	ESSEC Business School	Cergy, Paris	Triple accreditation	8
France	European Business School Paris (OMNES Education, formerly INSEEC)	Paris		
France	Excelia Group (formerly Groupe Sup de Co La Rochelle)	La Rochelle, Tours, Orléans, Paris	Triple accreditation	52
France	Grenoble School of Management (GEM)	Grenoble	Triple accreditation	31
France	École de Management Appliqué	Paris		
France	HEC Paris	Jouy-en-Josas	Triple accreditation	2
France	IAE Aix-Marseille Graduate School of Management	Aix-en-Provence	EQUIS	82
France	ICN Business School	Nancy, Paris	Triple accreditation	89
France	IÉSEG School of Management	Lille, Paris	Triple accreditation	47
France	INSEAD	Fontainebleau	Triple accreditation	1
France	INSEEC School of Business and Economics (OMNES Education, formerly INSEEC)	Bordeaux, Paris, Lyon, Chambéry	AMBA	
France	Telecom Business School	Évry-Courcouronnes	AACSB, AMBA	75
France	ISG Business School	Paris		
France	IPE Management School Paris	Paris		
France	Institut supérieur européen de gestion group	Paris, Bordeaux, Lille, Lyon, Nantes, Strasbourg, Toulouse		
France	International School of Management	Paris		
France	ISC Paris School of Management	Paris	AACSB, AMBA	100
France	KEDGE Business School	Marseille, Bordeaux, Toulon, Paris	Triple accreditation	34
France	Montpellier Business School	Montpellier	Triple accreditation	69
France	NEOMA Business School	Reims, Rouen	Triple accreditation	32
France	Paris Dauphine University, Paris Sciences et Lettres University	Paris	EQUIS	
France	Paris School of Business	Paris, Rennes	AACSB, AMBA	93
France	Skema Business School	Paris, Lille	AACSB, EQUIS	26
France	TBS Education	Toulouse, Paris	Triple accreditation	54
Germany	Berlin School of Business and Innovation	Berlin		
Germany	Berlin School of Economics and Law	Berlin	AMBA	
Germany	CBS International Business School	Cologne, Mainz, Potsdam		
Germany	University of Cologne Management Economics and Social Sciences Faculty	Cologne	EQUIS	65
Germany	EBS Business School, EBS University of Business and Law	Oestrich-Winkel	AACSB	50
Germany	ESB Business School, Reutlingen University	Reutlingen	AACSB	
Germany	ESCP Europe	Berlin	AACSB, EQUIS	5
Germany	European School of Management and Technology (ESMT)	Berlin	Triple accreditation	19
Germany	EU Business School (OMNES Education, formerly INSEEC)	Munich		
Germany	FOM University of Applied Sciences	Essen	FIBAA	
Germany	Frankfurt School of Finance & Management	Frankfurt	Triple accreditation	41
Germany	GISMA Business School	Hannover, Berlin	AMBA	
Germany	Goethe Business School, Goethe University Frankfurt	Frankfurt	AACSB	
Germany	HHL Leipzig Graduate School of Management, formerly known as Handelshochschule Leipzig	Leipzig	AACSB	64
Germany	HSBA Hamburg School of Business Administration	Hamburg		
Germany	IESE Business School	Munich	AACSB, EQUIS	3
Germany	International Business School	Lippstadt, Nuremberg		
Germany	International School of Management	Dortmund		
Germany	Kühne Logistics University	Hamburg	AACSB	
Germany	Mannheim Business School	Mannheim	Triple accreditation	20
Germany	Mercator School of Management, University of Duisburg-Essen	Duisburg		
Germany	Munich Business School	Munich		
Germany	New European College	Munich		
Germany	Northern Institute of Technology Management	Hamburg		
Germany	Open School of Management	Berlin		
Germany	Pforzheim University of Applied Sciences School of Business	Pforzheim	AACSB	
Germany	RWTH Aachen Faculty of Business and Economics, RWTH Aachen University	Aachen	AACSB	
Germany	Stuttgart Institute of Management and Technology	Stuttgart		
Germany	Technische Hochschule Nürnberg OHM Professional School	Nürnberg		
Germany	TUM School of Management, Technical University of Munich	Munich	Triple accreditation	
Germany	University of Greifswald Faculty of Law and Economics			
Germany	University of Mannheim Business School			
Germany	University of Münster School of Business and Economics		AACSB	
Germany	WFI – Ingolstadt School of Management	Ingolstadt		
Germany	WHU – Otto Beisheim School of Management	Vallendar	AACSB, EQUIS	16
Greece	ALBA Graduate Business School, American College of Greece		AMBA	
Greece	Athens University of Economics and Business (AUEB)	Athens	AMBA	
Greece	CITY College, University of York Europe Campus		AMBA	
Hungary	Budapest Business School			
Hungary	Central European University Department of Economics and Business	Budapest		
Hungary	Corvinus University			
Hungary	International Business School Budapest			
Iceland	University of Iceland Faculty of Business Studies	Reykjavík	AMBA	
Iceland	Reykjavík University School of Business		AMBA	
Ireland	Cork University Business School, University College Cork	Cork	AACSB, AMBA	83
Ireland	Dublin Business School	Dublin		
Ireland	Dublin City University Business School	Dublin	Triple accreditation	
Ireland	EM Normandie Business School – Ireland	Dublin	Triple accreditation	
Ireland	European Business School Dublin	Dublin		
Ireland	J.E. Cairnes School of Business & Economics, University of Galway	Galway	AACSB, AMBA	
Ireland	Kemmy Business School, University of Limerick	Limerick	Triple accreditation	
Ireland	Trinity Business School, Trinity College Dublin	Dublin	Triple accreditation	24
Ireland	Technological University Dublin Faculty of Business	Dublin	AMBA	
Ireland	UCD Michael Smurfit Graduate Business School, University College Dublin	Dublin	Triple accreditation	21
Italy	ALTIS – Postgraduate School Business & Society, UCSC	Milan		
Italy	Bologna Business School, University of Bologna	Bologna	EQUIS	66
Italy	Consortium Institute of Management and Business Administration (CIMBA)	Asolo, Paderno del Grappa		
Italy	CUOA Foundation	Altavilla Vicentina		
Italy	ESCP Business School	Turin	AACSB, EQUIS	5
Italy	European School of Economics	Florence, Genoa, Milan, Rome		
Italy	Frank J. Guarini School of Business, John Cabot University	Rome	AACSB	
Italy	POLIMI Graduate School of Management, Polytechnic University of Milan	Milan, Pieve del Grappa, Rome	Triple accreditation	37
Italy	ISTAO - Istituto Adriano Olivetti Ancona	Ancona		
Italy	ISTUD	Baveno		
Italy	LUISS Business School, Luiss University	Rome, Belluno, Milan	Triple accreditation	55
Italy	MIB School of Management Trieste	Trieste	AMBA	
Italy	SDA Bocconi School of Management, Bocconi University	Milan, Rome	Triple accreditation	6
Latvia	RTU Riga Business School	Riga		
Latvia	Riga International School of Economics and Business Administration	Riga		
Latvia	Stockholm School of Economics in Riga	Riga		
Lithuania	ISM University of Management and Economics	Kaunas		
Luxembourg	Luxembourg School of Business	Luxembourg City		
Luxembourg	Business Science Institute		AMBA	
Malta	GBSB Global Business School	Birkirkara		
Malta	GBS HE Malta	Sliema		
Monaco	International University of Monaco (OMNES Education, formerly INSEEC)	Monaco	AACSB, AMBA	
Netherlands	Amsterdam Business School, University of Amsterdam	Amsterdam	Triple accreditation	92
Netherlands	University of Groningen Faculty of Economics and Business	Groningen	AACSB, EQUIS	
Netherlands	HAN International School of Business, HAN University of Applied Sciences	Arnhem	EFMD, FIBAA	
Netherlands	International Business School Groningen, Hanze University Groningen	Groningen		
Netherlands	LUISS Business School, Luiss University	Amsterdam	Triple accreditation	
Netherlands	Maastricht School of Management, Maastricht University	Maastricht	AMBA	
Netherlands	Maastricht University School of Business and Economics	Maastricht	Triple accreditation	80
Netherlands	Nijmegen School of Management, Radboud University	Nijmegen	AACSB	
Netherlands	Nyenrode Business University	Breukelen	AMBA, EQUIS	61
Netherlands	Rotterdam School of Management, Erasmus University	Rotterdam	Triple accreditation	17
Netherlands	TIAS School for Business and Society, Tilburg University	Tilburg	AACSB, AMBA	36
Netherlands	Tilburg School of Economics and Management, Tilburg University	Tilburg	AACSB	95
Netherlands	Vrije Universiteit Amsterdam School of Business and Economics	Amsterdam	AACSB	
Norway	University of Agder School of Business and Law	Kristiansand, Grimstad	AACSB	
Norway	BI Norwegian Business School	Oslo	Triple accreditation	42
Norway	Nord University Business School (HHN)	Bodø	AACSB	
Norway	Norwegian School of Economics (NHH)	Bergen	Triple accreditation	53
Norway	Trondheim Business School, Norwegian University of Science and Technology	Trondheim		
Poland	ESCP Business School	Warsaw	AACSB, EQUIS	
Poland	Gdańsk University of Technology Faculty of Management and Economics	Gdańsk	AMBA	
Poland	Kraków University of Economics Faculty of Management	Kraków		
Poland	Kozminski University	Warsaw	Triple accreditation	38
Poland	University of Łódź Faculty of Management	Łódź		
Poland	Nicolaus Copernicus University in Toruń Faculty of Economics and Management	Toruń	AACSB, AMBA	
Poland	Poznań University of Economics and Business	Poznań	AMBA	
Poland	SGH Warsaw School of Economics	Warsaw	Triple accreditation	
Poland	University of Economics in Katowice Faculty of Management	Katowice		
Poland	WSB University, Faculty of Management	Dąbrowa Górnicza		
Poland	University of Warsaw Faculty of Management	Warsaw	Triple accreditation	
Poland	Wroclaw University of Economics	Wroclaw	AMBA	
Portugal	AESE Business School	Lisbon	AMBA	
Portugal	Católica Lisbon School of Business & Economics, Catholic University of Portugal	Lisbon	Triple accreditation	22
Portugal	Católica Porto Business School, Catholic University of Portugal	Porto	Triple accreditation	94
Portugal	ISCTE Business School, ISCTE – University Institute of Lisbon	Lisbon	AACSB, AMBA	43
Portugal	Instituto Superior de Gestão	Lisbon		
Portugal	ISEG Lisbon School of Economics and Management, University of Lisboa	Lisbon	Triple accreditation	70
Portugal	Nova School of Business and Economics, NOVA University Lisbon	Lisbon	Triple accreditation	18
Portugal	Porto Business School, University of Porto	Porto	AACSB, AMBA	39
Russia	Graduate School of Business, Higher School of Economics	Moscow		
Russia	MSU Graduate School of Business Administration, Moscow State University	Moscow		
Russia	Higher School of Business, Kazan Federal University	Kazan		
Russia	Moscow Business School, Moscow Technological Institute	Moscow		
Russia	International School of Business, Financial University under the Government of the Russian Federation	Moscow	AMBA	
Russia	MGIMO School of Business and International Proficiency, MGIMO University	Moscow		
Russia	Moscow School of Management SKOLKOVO	Moscow	EQUIS	
Russia	Saint Petersburg State University Graduate School of Management	Saint Petersburg	Triple accreditation (suspended)	
Russia	State University of Management	Moscow		
Slovenia	DOBA Faculty of Applied Business and Social Studies Maribor			
Slovenia	IEDC-Bled School of Management	Bled	AMBA	
Slovenia	University of Ljubljana, School of Economics and Business	Ljubljana	Triple accreditation	72
Slovenia	University of Maribor Faculty of Economics and Business	Maribor	AACSB	
Spain	UPF Barcelona School of Management, Pompeu Fabra University	Barcelona	AMBA, EQUIS	
Spain	C3S Business School (Castelldefels School of Social Sciences)	Barcelona		
Spain	Deusto Business School, University of Deusto	Deusto	AACSB, AMBA	
Spain	EADA Business School	Barcelona	AMBA, EQUIS	27
Spain	EAE Business School	Barcelona, Madrid		
Spain	EOI Business School	Madrid		
Spain	ESADE Business School, ESADE, University Ramon Llull	Barcelona, Madrid, Sant Cugat del Vallès	Triple accreditation	12
Spain	ESCP Business School	Madrid	AACSB, EQUIS	5
Spain	ESDEN Business School, Escuela Superior de Negocios y Tecnologías			
Spain	ESIC Business & Marketing School	Madrid	AMBA	
Spain	European Business School Madrid	Madrid		
Spain	EU Business School (OMNES Education, formerly INSEEC)	Barcelona		
Spain	FUNDESEM Business School	Alicante		
Spain	GBSB Global Business School	Barcelona, Madrid		
Spain	Graduate School of Business and Economics, Charles III University of Madrid	Madrid	AACSB, AMBA	
Spain	ICADE, Comillas Pontifical University	Madrid	AACSB	
Spain	IE Business School, IE University	Madrid, Segovia	Triple accreditation	10
Spain	IESE Business School, University of Navarra	Barcelona, Madrid,	AACSB, EQUIS	4
Spain	IESIDE Business Institute	Vigo		
Spain	IQS Business School, Chemical Institute of Sarrià (Spanish: Instituto Químico de Sarriá)	Sarrià	AACSB	84
Spain	TBS Education	Barcelona	Triple accreditation	54
Spain	University of Navarra School of Economics and Business	Pamplona	EQUIS	
Spain	University of Oviedo Faculty of Economics and Business	Oviedo	AACSB	
Sweden	Gothenburg School of Business, Economics and Law, University of Gothenburg	Gothenburg	Triple accreditation	
Sweden	Jönköping International Business School (JIBS), Jönköping University	Jönköping	Triple accreditation	74
Sweden	Karlstad University Business School	Karlstad	AACSB	
Sweden	Linnaeus University School of Business and Economics	Kalmar, Växjö	AACSB	
Sweden	Lund School of Economics and Management (LUSEM), Lund University	Lund	Triple accreditation	68
Sweden	Örebro University School of Business, Örebro University	Örebro	AACSB	
Sweden	Stockholm School of Economics (SSE)	Stockholm	EQUIS	23
Sweden	Stockholm Business School (SBS), Stockholm University	Stockholm	AMBA	
Sweden	Umeå School of Business (USBE), Umeå University	Umeå	AACSB	
Switzerland	Basel School of Business (BSB)	Basel		
Switzerland	Business and Hotel Management School (Member of the Bénédict Switzerland Network)	Lucerne		
Switzerland	Business School Lausanne	Lausanne		
Switzerland	École Polytechnique Fédérale de Lausanne College of Management of Technology	Lausanne	AMBA	
Switzerland	EU Business School (OMNES Education, formerly INSEEC)	Geneva, Montreux		
Switzerland	FHNW School of Business, University of Applied Sciences and Arts Northwestern Switzerland (FHNW)	Basel, Brugg-Windisch, Muttenz and Olten	AACSB	
Switzerland	Geneva Business School	Geneva		
Switzerland	Geneva School of Economics and Management, University of Geneva	Geneva	AMBA	
Switzerland	HEC Lausanne, University of Lausanne (UNIL)	Lausanne	AMBA, EQUIS	51
Switzerland	IFM Business School	Geneva		
Switzerland	International Institute for Management Development (IMD)	Lausanne	Triple accreditation	14
Switzerland	International institute of management in technology, University of Fribourg	Fribourg		
Switzerland	Kalaidos University of Applied Sciences Department of Business and Management	Bern, Geneva, Lausanne, Zurich		
Switzerland	Lucerne School of Business, Lucerne University of Applied Sciences and Arts	Lucerne	AACSB	96
Switzerland	Swiss Business School	Zürich		
Switzerland	Swiss Management Center (SMC)	Zug		
Switzerland	University of St. Gallen	St. Gallen	Triple accreditation	9
Switzerland	University of Zurich Faculty of Economics	Zurich	AACSB, EQUIS	81
Switzerland	Zurich University of Applied Sciences/ZHAW, School of Management and Law (SML)	Winterthur	Triple accreditation	62
Turkey	Bilkent University Faculty of Business Administration	Ankara	AACSB	
Turkey	Istanbul University School of Business	Istanbul	AACSB	
Turkey	Koç University Graduate School of Business	Istanbul	Triple accreditation	58
Turkey	Özyeğin University Faculty of Business Administration	Istanbul	AACSB	
Turkey	Sabancı Business School	Istanbul	AACSB	53
Turkey	Sakarya Business School	Sakarya	AACSB	
Ukraine	IIB International Institute of Business	Kyiv	AMBA	
Ukraine	International Institute of Management (IMI-Kyiv)	Kyiv	AMBA	
Ukraine	Kyiv School of Economics (KSE)	Kyiv		
Ukraine	Kyiv National Economic University Faculty of Economics and Management	Kyiv		
Ukraine	Kyiv National University of Trade and Economics Faculty of Economics, Management and Law	Kyiv		
United Kingdom – England	Anglia Ruskin University Faculty of Business and Law	Cambridge, Chelmsford, Peterborough, London		
United Kingdom – England	Aston Business School, Aston University	Birmingham	Triple accreditation	97
United Kingdom – England	Bath Business School, Bath Spa University	Bath		
United Kingdom – England	University of Bath School of Management	Bath	EQUIS	90
United Kingdom – England	Bedfordshire Business School, University of Bedfordshire	Luton		
United Kingdom – England	Birkbeck Business School, Birkbeck, University of London	London		
United Kingdom – England	Birmingham Business School, University of Birmingham	Birmingham	Triple accreditation	
United Kingdom – England	Birmingham City Business School, Birmingham City University	Birmingham		
United Kingdom – England	BNU School of Business and Law, Buckinghamshire New University	High Wycombe		
United Kingdom – England	Bournemouth University Business School	Bournemouth	AACSB	
United Kingdom – England	University of Bradford School of Management	Bradford	Triple accreditation	
United Kingdom – England	Brighton Business School, University of Brighton	Brighton		
United Kingdom – England	Bayes Business School, City St George's, University of London	London	Triple accreditation	44
United Kingdom – England	Bristol Business School, University of the West of England	Bristol		
United Kingdom – England	Brunel Business School, Brunel University London	Uxbridge	AACSB, AMBA	
United Kingdom – England	Buckingham Business School, University of Buckingham	Buckingham		
United Kingdom – England	Bloomsbury Institute	London		
United Kingdom – England	Cambridge Judge Business School, University of Cambridge	Cambridge	EQUIS	28
United Kingdom – England	Canterbury Christ Church University, Christ Church Business School	Canterbury		
United Kingdom – England	University of Chester Business School	Chester		
United Kingdom – England	University of Chicago Booth School of Business London	London	AACSB	
United Kingdom – England	Claude Littner Business School, University of West London	London		
United Kingdom – England	Coventry University Business School	Coventry, London		
United Kingdom – England	Cranfield School of Management, Cranfield University	Cranfield	Triple accreditation	25
United Kingdom – England	Derby Business School, University of Derby	Derby		
United Kingdom – England	Durham University Business School	Durham	Triple accreditation	58
United Kingdom – England	Edge Hill Business School, Edge Hill University	Ormskirk		
United Kingdom – England	EM Normandie Business School – UK	Oxford	Triple accreditation	
United Kingdom – England	ESCP Business School	London	AACSB, EQUIS	5
United Kingdom – England	Essex Business School, University of Essex	Colchester	AMBA	
United Kingdom – England	European College of Business and Management	London		
United Kingdom – England	European School of Economics	London		
United Kingdom – England	University of Exeter Business School	Exeter	Triple accreditation	
United Kingdom – England	Fashion Business School, London College of Fashion, University of the Arts London	London		
United Kingdom – England	University of Gloucestershire School of Business and Technology	Cheltenham		
United Kingdom – England	Goldsmiths, University of London Institute of Management Studies	London		
United Kingdom – England	Greater Manchester Business School, University of Greater Manchester	Bolton		
United Kingdom – England	University of Greenwich Business School	London		
United Kingdom – England	Henley Business School, University of Reading	Henley-on-Thames	Triple accreditation	35
United Kingdom – England	University of Hertfordshire Business School	Hatfield		
United Kingdom – England	University of Huddersfield Business School	Huddersfield	AACSB	
United Kingdom – England	Hull University Business School	Hull	AACSB, AMBA	
United Kingdom – England	Hult Ashridge Executive Education	Hertfordshire	Triple accreditation	
United Kingdom – England	Hult International Business School	London	Triple accreditation	59
United Kingdom – England	Imperial College Business School	London	Triple accreditation	29
United Kingdom – England	Keele Business School, University of Keele	Keele		
United Kingdom – England	Kent Business School, University of Kent	Canterbury	Triple accreditation	
United Kingdom – England	King's Business School, King's College London	London	Triple accreditation	
United Kingdom – England	Kingston Business School, Kingston University	London	AACSB, AMBA	
United Kingdom – England	Lancashire School of Business and Enterprise, University of Central Lancashire	Preston		
United Kingdom – England	Lancaster University Management School	Lancaster	Triple accreditation	76
United Kingdom – England	Leeds Business School, Leeds Beckett University	Leeds		
United Kingdom – England	Leeds Trinity University Business School	Leeds		
United Kingdom – England	Leeds University Business School	Leeds	Triple accreditation	98
United Kingdom – England	University of Leicester School of Business	Leicester	AMBA	
United Kingdom – England	Leicester Castle Business School, De Montfort University Leicester	Leicester		
United Kingdom – England	Lincoln International Business School, University of Lincoln	Lincoln		
United Kingdom – England	Liverpool Business School, Liverpool John Moores University	Liverpool	AACSB	
United Kingdom – England	Liverpool Hope Business School, Liverpool Hope University	Liverpool	AACSB	
United Kingdom – England	University of Liverpool Management School	Liverpool	Triple accreditation	
United Kingdom – England	London Business School	London	Triple accreditation	3
United Kingdom – England	Guildhall School of Business and Law, London Metropolitan University	London		
United Kingdom – England	London School of Business and Finance	London		
United Kingdom – England	London School of Economics Department of Management	London		
United Kingdom – England	London South Bank University School of Business	London		
United Kingdom – England	Middlesex University Business School	London		
United Kingdom – England	University of Law Business School	London		
United Kingdom – England	Walbrook Institute London	London		
United Kingdom – England	Loughborough University School of Business and Economics	Loughborough	Triple accreditation	
United Kingdom – England	Magna Carta College	Oxford		
United Kingdom – England	Alliance Manchester Business School, University of Manchester	Manchester	Triple accreditation	40
United Kingdom – England	Manchester Metropolitan University Business School	Manchester	Triple accreditation	
United Kingdom – England	Newcastle Business School, Northumbria University	Newcastle upon Tyne	AACSB	
United Kingdom – England	Newcastle University Business School	Newcastle upon Tyne	Triple accreditation	
United Kingdom – England	University of Northampton Faculty of Business and Law	Northampton		
United Kingdom – England	Norwich Business School, University of East Anglia	Norwich	AMBA	
United Kingdom – England	Nottingham Business School, Nottingham Trent University	Nottingham	Triple accreditation	
United Kingdom – England	Nottingham University Business School, University of Nottingham	Nottingham	Triple accreditation	
United Kingdom – England	Open University Business School	Milton Keynes	Triple accreditation	
United Kingdom – England	Oxford Brookes University Business School	Oxford	AMBA	
United Kingdom – England	University of Plymouth Faculty of Business	Plymouth		
United Kingdom – England	Portsmouth Business School, University of Portsmouth	Portsmouth	AACSB	
United Kingdom – England	Queen Mary University of London School of Business and Management	London	AACSB	
United Kingdom – England	Regent's Business School London, Regent's University London	London		
United Kingdom – England	University of Roehampton Faculty of Business and Law	Roehampton		
United Kingdom – England	Royal Docks School of Business and Law, University of East London	London		
United Kingdom – England	Royal Holloway School of Management, Royal Holloway, University of London	Egham	AACSB	
United Kingdom – England	Saïd Business School, University of Oxford	Oxford	AACSB, EQUIS	13
United Kingdom – England	Salford Business School, University of Salford	Salford		
United Kingdom – England	Sheffield Business School, Sheffield Hallam University	Sheffield	AACSB	
United Kingdom – England	University of Sheffield Management School, University of Sheffield	Sheffield	Triple accreditation	
United Kingdom – England	Southampton Solent University, Department of Business and Law	Southampton		
United Kingdom – England	Southampton Business School, University of Southampton	Southampton	AMBA	
United Kingdom – England	Staffordshire Business School, University of Staffordshire	Stoke-on-Trent		
United Kingdom – England	University of Sunderland Business School	Sunderland, London		
United Kingdom – England	Suffolk Business School, University of Suffolk	Ipswich		
United Kingdom – England	Surrey Business School, University of Surrey	Guildford	AACSB, AMBA	
United Kingdom – England	University of Sussex Business School	Falmer	AMBA, EQUIS	
United Kingdom – England	Teesside University International Business School	Middlesbrough		
United Kingdom – England	UA92 Business School, University Academy 92	Manchester		
United Kingdom – England	UCL School of Management, University College London	London		
United Kingdom – England	Warwick Business School, University of Warwick	Coventry, London	Triple accreditation	15
United Kingdom – England	Westminster Business School, University of Westminster	London		
United Kingdom – England	Winchester Business School, University of Winchester	Winchester		
United Kingdom – England	University of Wolverhampton Business School	Wolverhampton		
United Kingdom – England	Worcester Business School, University of Worcester	Worcester		
United Kingdom – England	York St John Business School, York St John University	York		
United Kingdom – England	University of York School for Business and Society	York		
United Kingdom – Northern Ireland	Belfast Business School, Belfast Metropolitan College	Belfast		
United Kingdom – Northern Ireland	Queen's Business School, Queen's University Belfast	Belfast	Triple accreditation	
United Kingdom – Northern Ireland	Ulster University Business School	Belfast, Coleraine, Derry, Jordanstown		
United Kingdom – Scotland	Adam Smith Business School, University of Glasgow	Glasgow	Triple accreditation	88
United Kingdom – Scotland	Aberdeen Business School, Robert Gordon University	Aberdeen	AACSB, AMBA	
United Kingdom – Scotland	University of Aberdeen Business School	Aberdeen		
United Kingdom – Scotland	Dundee Business School, Abertay University	Dundee		
United Kingdom – Scotland	University of Dundee School of Business	Dundee		
United Kingdom – Scotland	Edinburgh Business School, Heriot-Watt University	Edinburgh		
United Kingdom – Scotland	Edinburgh Napier Business School, Edinburgh Napier University	Edinburgh		
United Kingdom – Scotland	University of Edinburgh Business School, University of Edinburgh	Edinburgh	Triple accreditation	60
United Kingdom – Scotland	Glasgow School for Business and Society, Glasgow Caledonian University	Glasgow		
United Kingdom – Scotland	Queen Margaret Business School, Queen Margaret University	Edinburgh		
United Kingdom – Scotland	University of St Andrews Business School	St Andrews		
United Kingdom – Scotland	Stirling Management School, University of Stirling	Stirling		
United Kingdom – Scotland	Strathclyde Business School, University of Strathclyde	Glasgow	Triple accreditation	79
United Kingdom – Scotland	UWS School of Business and Creative Industries, University of the West of Scotland	Paisley		
United Kingdom – Wales	Albert Gubay Business School, Bangor University	Bangor		
United Kingdom – Wales	Cardiff Business School, Cardiff University	Cardiff	AACSB, AMBA	
United Kingdom – Wales	Cardiff School of Management, Cardiff Metropolitan University	Cardiff		
United Kingdom – Wales	South Wales Business School, University of South Wales	Newport, Treforest		
United Kingdom – Wales	Swansea Business School, University of Wales Trinity Saint David	Swansea		
United Kingdom – Wales	Swansea University School of Management	Swansea	AACSB	

== See also ==
- List of business schools in Africa
- List of business schools in Australia
- List of business schools in Asia
- List of business schools in the United States
