= Henning Behrens =

German economist

- Born: 1 February 1940 (age 86); Hamburg, Germany
- Occupations: Economist and political scientist

Henning Behrens (born 1 February 1940) is a German economist and political scientist.

In the 1970s, he worked as a special Assistant to the German government to coordinate basic research on divided Germany, helping to pave the final shift for the reunification of Germany in the late 1980s. At that time period, he also started his academic career: publishing 7 books and numerous articles in the disciplines of international relations, economics and business, with special reference to globalization. In the meanwhile, he has also become an internationally renowned researcher and consultant.

== Biography ==
After the Abitur at the Gymnasium in Hamburg-Blankenese (North Germany) he has studied economics and political science. He received his double Diplomas (Diplom Volkswirt & Diplom-Politologe) at the Freie Universität Berlin. In 1978, he received a doctorate (Promotion in Staatswissenschaften) in Decision-Making Theory and Empirical Processes covering Politics, Economics and Business from LMU Munich, which became his first book published in the Westdeutscher Verlag: Studien zur Sozialwissenschaft, Bd. 42.

His university, School of Advanced Studies and Business School Professorships (Prof. of German Politics / International Relations and Economics / Global Enterprise), includes European and American Universities and Business Schools: a.o. the University of Southern California, the Johns Hopkins University and since 1990, the European University (35th Anniversary) with MBA and Executive MBA Programs at 16 European/International Campuses. Henning Behrens is Founding Father and President of the Center for Globalization (DE/IT). As Director of Global Enterprise Consult and Political Advisor he has been designing and in many cases successfully implementing core strategic projects. On the levels of Government Administrations, Mittelstand & Multinational Enterprises and International / Supranational Organizations they cover the transitions since 1989/90 from bipolar to multipolar politics, the "none-zero sum deescalated" German Reunification, the open economic and political European Integration and the economic and non-economic interfaces of Globalization vibrating the 21st century. Main consulting activities also cover the Far East with special reference to Start-up Management Projects in China's Special Economic Zones.

Henning Behrens’ publications include the German version Global Enterprise: Panoramabild globaler Zivilisation (2007) and an English version, Globalization Vibrates The 21st century (2010). These works combine two decades of teaching, consulting, and analysis regarding globalization. Behrens uses autobiographical accounts and case studies to discuss political, economic, social, and cultural elements for an audience of entrepreneurs, politicians, managers, and citizens.

== Model of globalization ==
The main bullet points of Behrens's in-depth analysis of 21st-century globalization encompass:

1. A chronology of the globalizing economic activities in the world economy and in the global business competition
2. A survey of the non-economic phenomena of globalization integrating world politics, globalizing societies, world culture and global ethics
3. A comparison of the bipolar (West–East) world of the Cold War period to the multipolar challenges of the new emerging markets and powers changing the contemporary power structure fundamentally with new empire rivalries (e.g. US–China)
4. The analyzed rising of a power gaining Civil Society and their Global Players actor groups engaging in Ecology, Human Rights or Conflict De-escalation
5. Developed concepts for the explanation of globalization: trade/FDI – business dynamics & technology – innovation & knowledge societies – increasing number and interdependent potentials of the global players in the international/global System of the 21st century
6. Consulting concepts of fitness for globalization: global enterprise competences for multinational enterprise managers, in politics, for non-government organizations (NGOs) and for individual more globally oriented citizens, employees and consumers
7. Comparative examples set by in the long run successful political and economic infrastructure models: a.o. the social market economic system of Germany having mastered the WWII destructions, the reunification, the integration into the EU and finally even the turmoil of the global financial and economic crisis 2008–2010
8. A reflection of moral dilemmas and of a neoliberal/cosmopolitical oriented globalization reform: beyond the manifold globalization opportunities there is ample space for systematic globalization critique and practical reforms towards a world most of us would prefer to live in for the longer run

For Behrens, globalization for a long time had looked like a "Gordon's knot" to be "continuously attacked" with more adequate methods and cases-based integral in-depth analysis. Having "passed that tunnel, with light at the end", for him (resp. his students and clients), there is "much more fun" in better educated global context decision-making and in learning.

== Bibliography ==
- Decision-Making Processes in Politics, Business, Psychology and Society (Published in German: Politische Entscheidungsprozesse. Westdeutscher Verlag: Studien zur Sozialwissenschaft; Bd 42, 1980, ISBN 3-531-11497-2
- Germany: FRG/GDR – Comparative Systems. (Collaboration); (Published in German: BRD/DDR: Systemvergleich 2 und 3: Materialien zum Bericht zur Lage der Nation. Mitarbeit, Westdeutscher Verlag, 1972/1974 & Bundestagsdrucksache VII/2423 )
- Afghanistan – Intervention of the U.S.S.R. (Published in German: Die Afghanistan Intervention der UdSSR. 1982, Tuduv-Verlag, ISBN 3-88073-109-8
- Compendium of International Business (Chapt./Outline-Contribution). (Published in German: Kompendium der Internationalen BWL . 1991, Oldenbourg Verlag, ISBN 3-486-22225-2)
- 15 Audited Quality Handbooks (15 Qualitäts-Handbücher in German/English, Corporations)
- Strategy and Tactics of International Negotiations. (Published in German: Strategie und Taktik Internationaler Verhandlungsprozesse. 1983, GCR-Buch, CH)
- Theories of International Relations (Co-Author). (Published in German: Theorien der Internationalen Politik (Koautor). 1984, Deutscher Taschenbuch Verlag, ISBN 3-423-04414-4)
- Global Enterprise: Panorama View of the Global Civilization in the 21st century (Published in German: Global Enterprise: Panoramabild Globaler Zivilisation im 21. Jahrhundert. 2007, Edition-Lithaus, ISBN 978-3-939305-03-3)
- Globalization Vibrates The 21st century: How Global Enterprises Revolutionize International Business, Digital Societies, World Economy, Global Governance Leadership and Global Living of Mankind.(English Publication: Globalization vibrates The 21st century. 2010, uni-edition, Berlin, ISBN 978-3-942171-11-3)
