= Wale Bolorunduro =

Nigerian engineer and oil & gas professional

Samuel 'Wale Bolorunduro (born 1966) is a Nigerian engineer, oil & gas professional, financial consultant and seasoned banker. He was the Commissioner of Finance, Budget and Economic Planning in the State of Osun, Nigeria (2011–15). Wale Bolorunduro is currently a director and the Chairman of, the Board of Living Trust Mortgage Bank Plc, Nigeria.

== Early life ==
Born in 1966, Bolorunduro is an Ijesa from Ere City in Oriade Local Government of Obokun/Oriade or Ijesa North Federal Constituency of Osun State.

== Education ==
(WAEC). Bolorunduro attended Ilesha Grammar School where he sat for the secondary school certificate examination. He also attended the Obafemi Awolowo University where he earned a bachelor's degree in metallurgical and materials engineering, first class in 1990. He obtained a master's degree in business management (1999) and a Ph.D. in management (2002) from the University of British Columbia, Canada. He has attended courses and conferences in different parts of the world including a project finance executive course organised by Wharton Business School. He also holds a master's degree in corporate governance of Leeds Business School (2009).

== Employment ==
Bolorunduro began his career working as a facilities manager at Mobil Producing Nigeria in 1990. In 1991, he joined the service of the Arthur Andersen (now KPMG Professional Services). Afterwards, he was employed by the Zenith Bank for about 15 years working in the financial, corporate banking, infrastructures and power departments. Before his first exit from Zenith Bank, he was their deputy manager, strategic planning and finance control for close to four years. In 1997, he was employed as a senior consultant by Arthur Andersen & Co Vancouver BC, Canada. He later moved to BMO Nesbitt Burns (Investment Banking Group), Vancouver, BC Canada as Manager (Project Finance). Boulunduro was also employed as a Teaching/Research Associate in the University of British Columbia, Vancouver in 2001. He returned to Zenith in 2003 take up an appointment as a senior manager in the Energy Division. Within the span of eight years he spent during his second coming to Zenith Bank from 2003 to 2011, he held many key managerial positions: assistant general manager, deputy manager, group head (Telecoms & Technologies Business) and general manager (head of Infrastructure and Power Sector).

== Achievements and awards ==
For his brilliant performance during his undergraduate studies, Bolorunduro was given various awards for making the best grade in the Faculty of Technology, Obafemi Awolowo University. He was awarded Miccom Award for the best graduating students; Nigerian Society of Engineers Award for the best graduating student in the Faculty of Engineering and University Award for the graduating student with the highest Cumulative Grade Point Average for the year 1990. Bolorunduro is said to be the one that pioneered construction financing in Telecom industry in Nigeria (2003-2006) and as well as project finance transactions in Upstream Oil and Gas, Telecoms, Power and Infrastructures. He is also known to be the brain behind the lift in the internally generated revenue of the State of Osun. When he held sway as the finance commissioner in Osun State, the monthly internally generated revenue of the state leaped from 300 million to 600 million.
