= Beatrice Avolio Alecchi =

Beatrice Avolio
- Born: Beatrice Elcira Avolio Alecchi; 1967 (age 58–59)
- Education: Universidad del Pacífico (bachelor's degree); Maastricht School of Management (master's degree); ESAN, Graduate School of Business (master's degree); Pontifical Catholic University of Peru (Doctorate's degree); Maastricht School of Management (Doctorate's degree)
- Awards: Recognized by Forbes Peru as one of the "50 Most Powerful Women in Peru" (2024)
- Scientific career
- Workplaces: CENTRUM PUCP Business School

Beatrice Elcira Avolio Alecchi (Lima, 1967) is a Peruvian academic and researcher specializing in financial management, strategic planning, and gender equity in business. She currently serves as the general director and principal professor at CENTRUM PUCP Business School, the business school of the Pontifical Catholic University of Peru (PUCP). Avolio is known for her contributions to research on gender inclusion, leadership, and time management in academia and business.

== Biography ==
=== Early life and education ===
Beatrice Avolio was born in Lima, Peru, in 1967. She completed her undergraduate studies at the Universidad del Pacífico, where she obtained the degrees of Bachelor in Business Administration and bachelor's degree in accounting. She pursued her higher education in business and finance, earning a PhD in business administration from Maastricht School of Management in the Netherlands and a PhD in strategic business administration from PUCP. Throughout her academic journey, she developed a strong interest in financial planning, risk analysis, and gender equity in professional environments.

=== Career ===
Avolio began her professional career in accounting and administration, working for internationally recognized companies such as Price Waterhouse, Southern Peru Ltd., and Procter & Gamble (Deter Peru S.A.). In 2001, she joined CENTRUM PUCP, where she has held key academic and administrative positions, including director of executive education, academic director, and administrative director. In 2015 she became a member of the Annual Conference of Executives (CADE) for education. In 2017 she was one of the directors of the Women's CEO program. Since 2014, she has been the head of the Academic Department of Graduate Business Studies, and in 2024, she was appointed general director of the institution.

Her research focuses on social sciences, economics, and education, particularly in business management, gender studies, diversity, inclusion, social progress, time use, work-life balance, and graduate business education management. Avolio has been a visiting professor at the School of High Business Management (EADA) in Barcelona, Spain, and an honorary professor at Maastricht School of Management.

She is the founder of the Women's Research Center at CENTRUM PUCP, now known as the Research Center for Socially Responsible Leadership, Women, and Equity, which promotes women's capacities in various professional fields through research on economic and professional activities.

Avolio has also held leadership roles in organizations advocating for gender equality. In 2021, she chaired the Pro Women in Science, Technology, and Innovation Committee at the National Council of Science, Technology, and Innovation (CONCYTEC) and served as Vice President of the Diversity Committee at the American Chamber of Commerce of Peru (AMCHAM).

== Selected works ==
- Avolio, B. E., & Chávez, J. (2024). Identifying factors influencing women academics in STEM careers: Evidence from a Latin American country. International Journal of Educational Management, 38(5), 1357–1374. https://doi.org/10.1108/IJEM-02-2023-0082
- Avolio, B. E., Pardo, E., & Prados-Peña, M. B. (2024). Factors that contribute to the underrepresentation of women academics worldwide: A literature review. Social Psychology of Education, 27, 261–281. https://doi.org/10.1007/s11218-023-09838-3
- Mousa, M., Avolio, B. and Molina-Moreno, V. (2024). "The Incas have no end: women artisans in Peru and the continuity of their entrepreneurial activity", International Journal of Organizational Analysis, 32(10), pp. 2705-2720. https://doi.org/10.1108/IJOA-09-2023-3974

== Awards and recognitions ==
- Recognized by Forbes Peru as one of the "50 Most Powerful Women in Peru" (2024).
- Appointed Chair of the Pro Women in Science, Technology, and Innovation Committee at CONCYTEC (2021).
- Vice president of the Diversity Committee at AMCHAM.

== See also ==
- Pontifical Catholic University of Peru
