= FUNDESEM Business School =

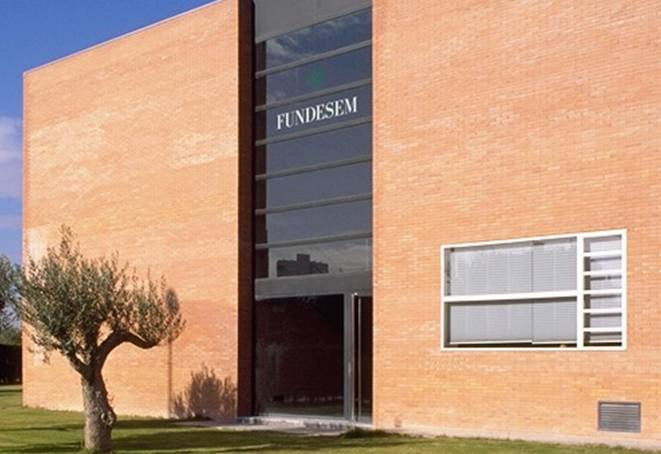
- Established: 1965; 61 years ago
- Parent institution: Fundación para el Desarrollo Empresarial (FUNDESEM)
- Chairman: Luis Gámir Casares (2012-2017), Executive Vice President: Miguel Rosique González
- Location: Alicante, Spain
- Website: www.fundesem.es

FUNDESEM Business School is a Spanish international business school located in Alicante. The school is owned and operated by the Fundación para el Desarrollo Empresarial (FUNDESEM) or FUNDESEM Foundation, which comprises more than 200 companies and institutions.

== History ==
The business school was founded in 1965.

Early in 2011 it was reported that the School would launch its own publishing house under its commercial name. As of today two titles have been published in Spanish.

In 2012, Luis Gámir was appointed as chairman of FUNDESEM and a new management team started to lead the business school.

== Programs ==
FUNDESEM Business School offers several graduate master's degree programs, including:

- Master in Business Administration (MBA)
- Executive MBA
- International MBA (IMBA)
- Master in Human Resources Management
- Master in International Business
- Master in Financial Management
- Master in Commercial Management and Marketing

The Business School offers an international MBA Double Degree Program in collaboration with a number of European and non-European business schools, taught entirely in English. It also offers a number of non-graduate management training and in-company programs.

In 2010, the school was one of Spain's top 20 according to the Eduniversal World Ranking. Several of its programs ranked among the five best in the country in 2010, according to Spanish daily El Mundo (Spain). In 2011, the school partnered with several businesses and institutions to provide grants to students taking business courses at FUNDESEM.

== Affiliations ==
The School has signed a number of student exchange programs with international educational institutions such as the University of Birmingham in the UK and the Georgia Institute of Technology College of Management in the USA.

It is a member of the 'Latin American Council of Business Schools' CLADEA and the 'European Foundation for Management Development' EFMD.

== See also ==
- List of business schools in Europe
