= ESDEN Business School =

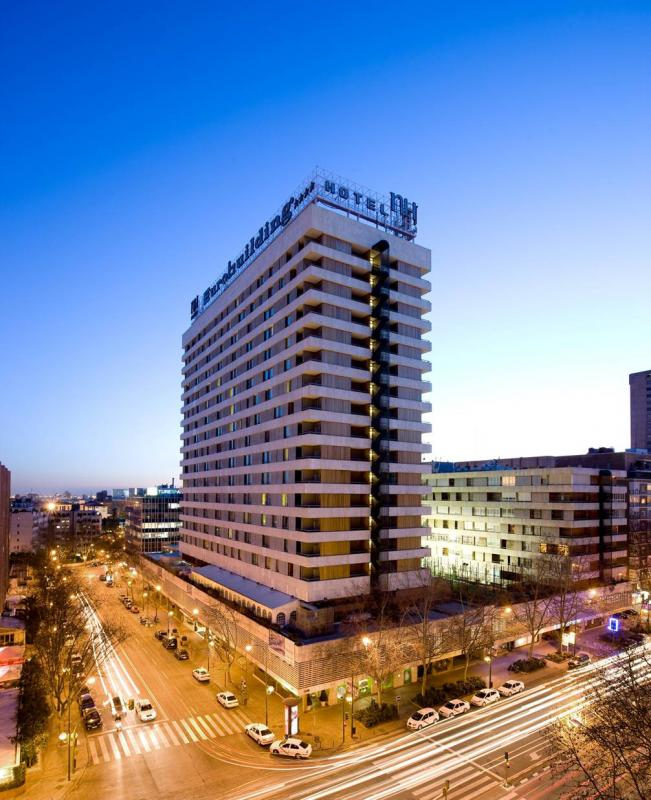
- Type: Private business school
- Established: 1996
- President: Alberto Isusi
- Location: Calle Ponzano, 87, Madrid, Spain; 40.431355°N 3.680015°W
- Campus: 7 (urban)
- Website: www.esden.es

ESDEN Business School is an international business school located in Madrid, Spain. Founded in 1996, it works in collaboration with the Madrid chapter of the Project Management Institute and the London School of Economics.

ESDEN holds an Association of Spanish Business Schools (AEEN), a Latin American Council of Business Schools (CLADEA) and a Qfor quality accreditations.

== Campuses ==
Esden Business School has campuses in Madrid, Bilbao and Barcelona. In Madrid, the campus has two locations in the financial district and it offers 15 programmes. In Bilbao, the campus is located in the Colegio de los Padres Escolapios. International campuses are located in Bogotá, Mexico City and Lima.

== Programmes ==
Esden Business School offers various MBA degree options and other master courses. Degree options are in combination of specializations, intakes and delivery formats. Admissions criteria for MBA candidates include holding a university degree, a relevant work experience and a required interview with programme directors. In addition, the school runs management and development courses.

== Main Masters Programs ==
- Global MBA
- MBA in General Management (60 ECTs) Formats - online, blended, and classroom-based
- MBA in Professional Degree
- MBA in Fashion Business Management
- Master in Project Management (PMP)
- Master in Digital Marketing and Internet Corporate Communication Management (Web 2.0)
- Master in Marketing and Commercial Management
- Master in International Trade Management
- Master in Protocol and Organisation of Events
- Master in Renewable Energy
- Master in Hospitality Business Management
- Master in Human Resources Management and Labour Relations
- Master in Quality & Safety Management
- Executive MBA

== See also ==
- List of business schools in Europe
- Business School
- Master of Business Administration
