= Sri Sri University =

Private university in Cuttack, India

- Motto: Sathyam Gyanam Anantham Brahma (Sanskrit)
- Type: Private
- Established: 26 December 2009; 16 years ago
- Founder: Sri Sri Ravi Shankar
- Affiliations: UGC
- President: Prof. (Mrs.) Rajita Kulkarni
- Vice-Chancellor: Prof. (Dr.) B.R. Sharma
- Location: Godi Sahi, Cuttack, Odisha, India; 20.4533°N 85.7974°E
- Campus: Urban, 188 acres (76 ha)
- Website: www.srisriuniversity.edu.in

Sri Sri University is an Indian private university, based in Kataka, Odisha, established on 26 December 2009. The university came into operation in the year 2012. At present, the university is offering different courses in areas of management, architecture, humanities, agriculture, health and wellness, science, literature, osteopathy and performing & fine arts.

== Founder ==
Sri Sri Ravi Shankar is the founder of Sri Sri University. Popularly known as Sri Sri, he has been an advocate of India's ancient traditions, scientific knowledge and spiritual heritage.

== History ==
On 22 February 2012, Sri Sri University was notified by the Higher Education Department of the Government of Odisha as a legal entity after clearing a High Power Committee (HPC) scrutiny of its infrastructure, academic, regulatory, financial and manpower preparedness. The notification has featured in an extraordinary issue of Government of Odisha Gazette.

=== Statutory approvals ===
The university has received approval from the Government of Odisha, the national University Grants Commission, All India Council for Technical Education, Indian Council of Agricultural Research and Council of Architecture to offer its degree programmes. As an independent university, Sri Sri University is also authorised to offer new courses, as per the Sri Sri University Act 2009.

== Awards ==
Sri Sri University's focus on sustainable living, emphasis on synthesis of ancient and modern along with innovation in teaching learning process have been appreciated and received recognition.,

- Environment Friendly Green Campus Award by District Administration, Cuttack, 2016
- 'Prakruti Mitra Award 2016' by Minister – Forest & Environment
- 'Sri Sri University as the Trend setting synthesizer of traditional and global outlook' by ASSOCHAM, 2017
- Best Innovative University Award-Second National Education Summit and Educational Excellence Awards 2017
- Nominated for Non-Violence Award by Non-Violence Project India Foundation, 2018
- ‘Green U Award 2019’ and ‘Inspiring Climate Educator Award 2019’ for bringing Nature into Higher Education at the National Green Mentors Conference, Ahmedabad.

== Campus ==
The campus houses the admin block, academic block, computer lab, library, seminar halls, practise halls, amphitheatre, hostels, Vidya (skill training centre), dining hall and cafeteria. The academic block houses classrooms, tutorial centres and a student activity centre. The university offers sports facilities including a gym, basketball court, lawn tennis court, volleyball court and a cricket ground.

=== Student clubs ===
There are currently 16 clubs dedicated to different activities.

== Vocational training ==
The university has started a vocational program in collaboration with Larsen & Toubro under its Corporate Social Responsibility commitments. All students of this vocational program are employed by L&T in their domestic and international projects. To begin with the university had started only bar bending and masonry skill programs. But presently new programs like driving, tailoring and other vocations have been included.

== Notable alumni ==
- Raghavan Seetharaman achieved a doctorate by submitting a Research Thesis on 'Green Banking and Sustainability' at Sri Sri University. He has also received Pravasi Bharatiya Samman Awards-2017, the highest honour conferred on overseas Indians, from the President of India.

== NIRF Rankings ==
Sri Sri University Overall ranking by National Institutional Ranking Framework Innovation is 51 out of 312 colleges in India in 2023 (2nd in Odisha).

== IIRF Rankings ==
Sri Sri University Overall ranking by IIRF is 11 out of 171 colleges in India in 2023 and it was 8 out of 161 colleges in India in 2022. Sri Sri University Architecture ranking by IIRF is 37 out of 45 colleges in India in 2024 and it was 36 out of 44 colleges in India in 2023.
