= Raghavan Seetharaman =

Former CEO of Doha Bank

- Occupations: Former CEO, Doha Bank
- Website: https://www.seetharaman.com

Raghavan Seetharaman is a former CEO of Doha Bank (DSM:DHBK). He resigned in March 2022 after 15 years as CEO. Set up in 1978, Doha Bank is one of the largest commercial banks in Qatar. In 2015, business magazine Forbes ranked Seetharaman 6th in the Forbes' Top Indian Leaders in the Arab World.

== Biography ==
Seetharaman was born and raised in Mayiladuthurai, Tamil Nadu, India. He received his Bachelor of Commerce from University of Madras and also is a Chartered Accountant and IT systems and Corporate Management specialist.

Seetharaman started his career at PricewaterhouseCoopers. After joining Doha Bank as Head of Technology & Operations, he became deputy CEO for Doha Bank 2002. Seetharaman was named CEO in September 2007. Since then, he has overseen the bank's expansion from its base in Qatar to the UAE, India, Singapore and China, among others.

In 2017, he received the Pravasi Bharatiya Samman Award.

In February 2022, Seetharaman founded the Seetharaman School of Sustainable Development, a Non-Governmental Organization (NGO) with a mission to advance the United Nations Sustainable Development Goals.

In 2023, Seetharaman was appointed as a member of the Board of Governors at Sri Sharada Institute of Indian Management (SRISIIM).

== Honours ==
Seetharaman has received PHDs and honours from:

- European University
- Sri Sri University
- Washington College
- European University Foundation - Campus Europae
- Arts, Sciences and Technology University in Lebanon
- Sri Sharada Institute of Indian Management (SRISIIM)
- Honoured with ‘Best CEO of the Century for Peace and Humanity’ award by World Humanitarian Drive WHD London
- Pravasi Bharatiya Samman Award
