= ISTAO =

- Istituto Adriano Olivetti di studi per la gestione dell'economia e delle aziende
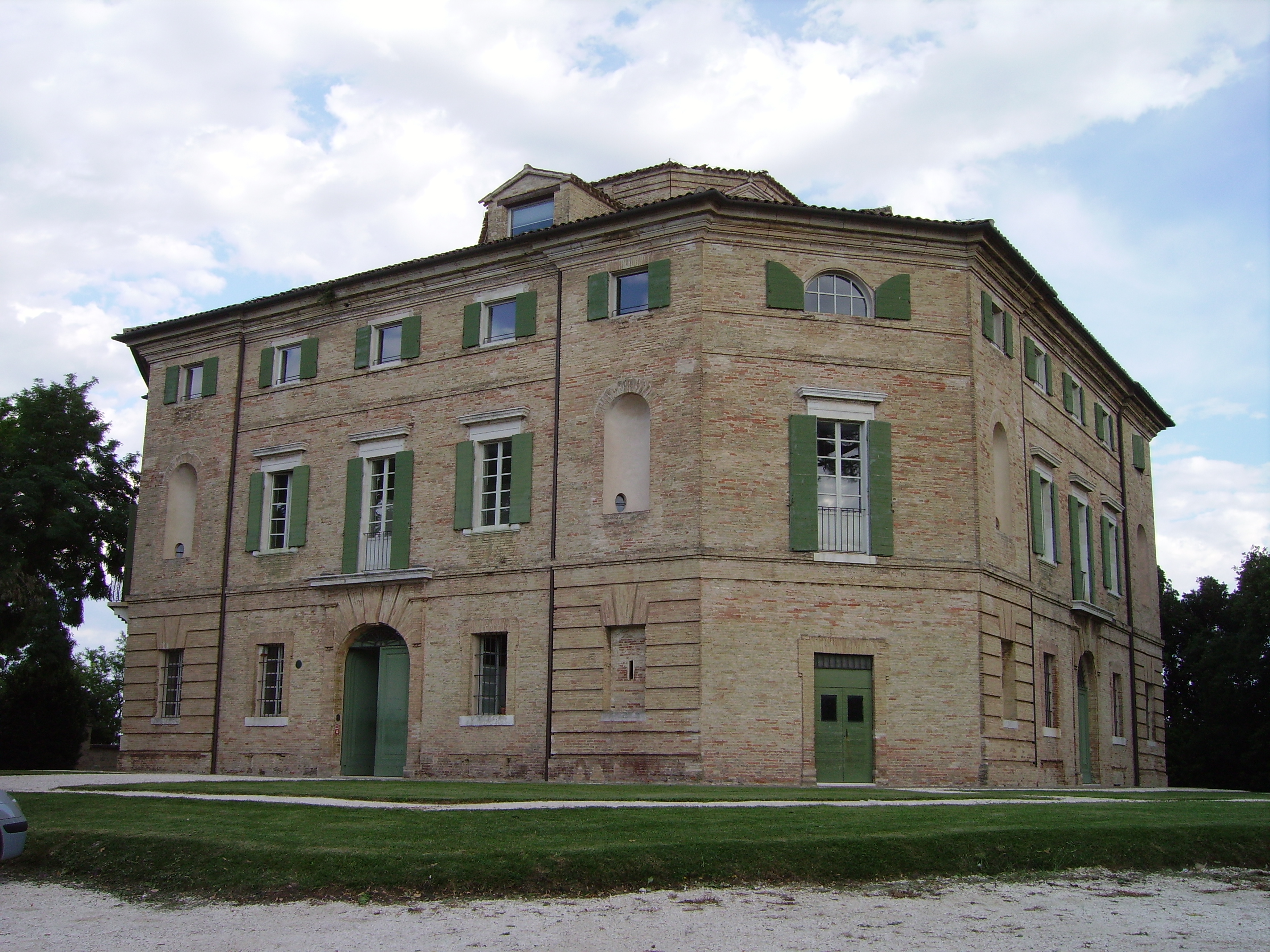
- Villa Favorita, seat of ISTAO
- Type: Business school
- Established: 1967
- Founders: Giorgio Fuà
- Location: Ancona, Italy

The Istituto Adriano Olivetti di studi per la gestione dell'economia e delle aziende, known as ISTAO is a business school in Ancona, established in 1967 by the Italian economist Giorgio Fuà. ISTAO organizes post-graduate and executive courses as well as it gives its contribution in the field of Economy and Finance. ISTAO is named upon the name of Adriano Olivetti, the well-known entrepreneur who created and managed the Olivetti company and worked with Fuà during the '40s. ISTAO has been established in 1967 within the new Faculty of Economics of Ancona whereas a group of people, led by Giorgio Fuà, started to gain interest in finding new methodologies and techniques in teaching and research fields. According to this proposition, ISTAO developed during the years a methodology that makes it completely different from the Italian academic system and nowadays the business school is characterized by its tight link with the regional economic network (The "productive model") and by the managerial style of its teaching.

== History ==
Since the very first period of activity of the school, Fuà and his colleagues underlined the need of a professional preparation over the academic one. During the '70s the base of the society is widened through the opening to the '’ founder members'’, the institutions and companies willing to contribute to the financial funding of the Institute, aside of the '’ordinary members'’ category, responsible of ensuring the scientific validity of School's initiatives. This structure is still on nowadays and it allowed ISTAO to host precious contributions in research and teaching activities by Italian and international professionals and experts. In 1997 Fuà ceases the role of President (remaining as Honorary President until the death in 2000). First President after Fuà is Sabino Cassese, then Paolo Pettenati from 2000 to 2008, supported by vice-President Valeriano Balloni since 2004. The three-year period from 2008 to 2011 is represented by Adolfo Guzzini, one of the outstanding figure of Marche industry network, supported once more by Valeriano Balloni. Starting from the academic year 2011–2012, the President is Andrea Merloni, President of Indesit, supported by Professor Gianluca Gregori, dean of the Faculty of Economics at Polytechnic University of the Marches.

== Main courses ==
Main post-graduate course taught at ISTAO is focused on strategy and management and it has been delivered every year for more than 40 years. Alongside it, other postgraduate courses are organized, including International management and Finance for business. ISTAO is in partnership with several foreign universities such as Ohio University and Masaryk University. The admission procedure involves different tests and interviews with a pool of ISTAO's professionals and representatives of companies and universities.

== Premises ==
- From 1967 to 1969: palazzo Arcivescovado, Ancona
- From 1969 to 1970: via Oddo Di Biagio 2, Ancona
- From 1970 to 1972: Corso Garibaldi 78, Ancona
- From 1972 to 1998: Villa Beer, via dell Grazie 7, Ancona
- From 1999: Villa Favorita, via Zuccarini 15, Ancona.

=== Presidents ===
- From 1967 to 1997: Giorgio Fuà, Economist
- From 1997 to 2000: Sabino Cassese, jurist and judge of Italian Constitutional Court
- From 2000 to 2008: Paolo Pettenati, economist.
- From 2008 to 2011: Adolfo Guzzini, Entrepreneur and President of iGuzzini Illuminazione.
- From 2011: Andrea Merloni, Entrepreneur and President of Indesit

=== Opening classes ===
- 1974–75: Giorgio Ruffolo
- 1977–78: Franco Modigliani
- 1978–79: Filippo Maria Pandolfi
- 1979–80: Antonio Giolitti
- 1980–81: Giorgio La Malfa
- 1981–82: Franco Reviglio
- 1982–83: Giuseppe De Rita
- 1983–84: Romano Prodi
- 1984–85: Carlo De Benedetti
- 1985–86: Carlo Azeglio Ciampi
- 1986–87: Mario Schimberni
- 1987–88: Cesare Romiti
- 1988–89: Antonio Maccanico
- 1989–90: Sergio Pininfarina
- 1990–91: G. Dioguardi, G. Marongiu, S. Zoppi
- 1991–92: Filippo Maria Pandolfi
- 1993–94: Luigi Abete
- 1994–95: Sabino Cassese
- 1995–96: Attilio Zuliani
- 1996–97: Giacomo Vaciago
- 1997–98: Enrico Bondi
- 1998–99: Sabino Cassese
- 1999–00: Maurizio Sella, president ABI and CEO Banca Sella
- 2000–01: Tommaso Padoa Schioppa, BCE
- 2001–02: Angelo Tantazzi, president Prometeia srl and president Borsa Italiana spa
- 2002–03: Luigi Spaventa, president Consob
- 2003–04: Rainer Stefano Masera, president Sanpaolo IMI
- 2004–05: Pietro Modiano, CEO Sanpaolo IMI
- 2005–06: Francesco Caio, CEO Cable&Wireless
- 2006–07: Andrea Guerra, CEO Luxottica
- 2007–08: Vittorio Merloni, president Indesit
- 2008–09: Roberto Poli, president ENI
- 2009–10: Brunello Cucinelli, president Brunello Cucinelli Spa
- 2010–11: Diego Della Valle, president Tod's
- 2011–12: Innocenzo Cipolletta, president UBS Italia SIM Spa
- 2012–13: Dominick Salvatore, economist and professor at Fordham University
