= OMNES Education =

French for-profit higher education provider in Paris

Omnes Education
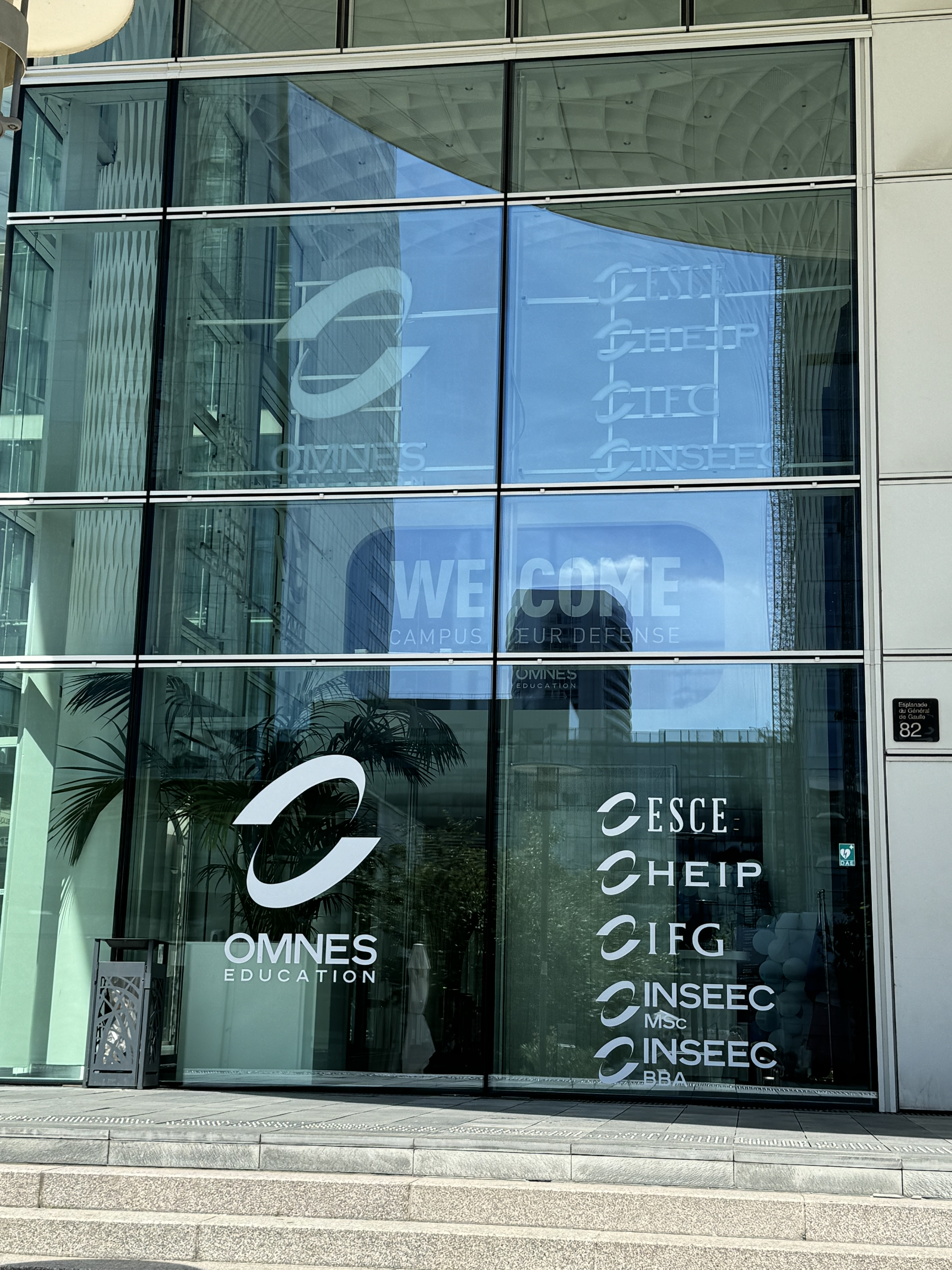
- Former names: INSEEC U., INSEEC Group
- Type: Private
- Established: 1899 Hautes Études Internationales et Politiques (HEIP); 1975 INSEEC Business School; 2010 INSEEC Group; 2017 INSEEC U.
- President: Françoise Gri
- Faculty: 1,145
- Students: 28,000
- Location: Paris, Bordeaux, Lyon, Chambéry, Monaco, London, Geneva, San Francisco, Île-de-France, France; 48.7117343°N 2.1712888°E
- Campus: Urban
- Website: www.omneseducation.com

Omnes Education, formerly INSEEC U. (French: INSEEC U.) is a for-profit higher education provider based in France, with French, European and international campuses in Paris, Bordeaux, Lyon, Chambéry, London, Monaco, Geneva, Abidjan and Shanghai as well as San Francisco. It encompasses 16 Schools, 10 campuses worldwide, 28,000 students (30 percent foreign students), over 100,000 alumni, 345 faculty members, 800 lecturers, 115 majors, 515 partner universities, 1,500 partner companies, 5000 executive education participants (known in French as intervenants) who teach alongside their career.

OMNES Education provides bachelor's degree, Grande École and non-Grande École Master's degrees, MBAs, PhDs and Diploma. It is a member of the Union of Independent Grandes Écoles and of the Conférence des grandes écoles (CGE) since 2009. INSEEC Business School, part of OMNES Education is AMBA-accredited since 2017. European Business School Paris, part of OMNES Education is a member of the Association to Advance Collegiate Schools of Business (AACSB). Omnes is a for-profit organisation owned by private equity firm Cinven.

== History ==
In 2010, the INSEEC Group purchases the International University of Monaco. INSEEC starts a partnership with Arts et Métiers ParisTech (ENSAM Engineering School). In 2011, INSEEC starts a tripartite agreement with Tsinghua University, Versailles Saint-Quentin-en-Yvelines University.

In 2012, the INSEEC Group buys the Consular Business School of Chambéry (ESC Chambéry) to create INSEEC Alpes Savoie Business School, an additional campus in the Alps. The incubant on-campus students' consulting association: INSEEC Conseil becomes officially Junior Enterprise-accredited, after being bestowed this prestigious label upon by the French National Confederation of Junior Enterprises.

In 2013, Career Education Corporation cedes its shares of the INSEEC Group. Apax Partners France, today known as Seven2, and BPI France acquires the INSEEC Group, making INSEEC's shareholders fully French again. In 2014, CREA Geneva was integrated into the INSEEC group. That year also saw the opening of the Luxury Business Institute (LBI) in Shanghai. In 2015, the ECE (École de Commerce Européenne): the European School of Business becomes the BBA INSEEC – BBA as for Business Bachelor, a 4-year American Bachelor curriculum. Establishment the same year of a Strategy Cluster in Lyon, specialised in Strategic management.

In 2016, INSEEC was established in San Francisco and acquired the French schools of the Lauréate International Group, (EBS, ESCE, ECE, IFG and the HEIP). In 2017, the INSEEC Group is renamed INSEEC U. The Grande École INSEEC Business School becomes INSEEC School of Business and Economics. INSEEC acquires HEIP (Hautes Etudes Internationales et Politiques – part of INSEEC U.), a Higher Education Institute specialised in Political Sciences, Diplomacy and International Relations established since 1899, with campuses in Paris, London and Lyon.

In 2018, HEIP, Hautes Études Internationales et Politiques and part of INSEEC U. signs an agreement with McQuarie University in Sydney. In January 2019, the INSEEC U. was valued at nearly one billion euros. In March 2019, the INSEEC group, was purchased by British investment fund Cinven, for a valuation of around 800 million euros. On 2 December 2019, INSEEC U. opened a campus of IFG, one of the group's schools, in Ivory Coast.

In 2020, INSEEC U. (INSEEC BS, EBS, ESCE) becomes financially the strongest Business School in France. In 2021, INSEEC U. rebranded to OMNES Education as part of a €100 million investment into the company over a 5-year period.

== Organisation and administration ==
INSEEC U. welcomed 22,000 students in 2017 (they were 10,000 in 2010); 8,000 managers and employees in continuing education; more than 80,000 alumni; 370 permanent professors and 150 researchers/professors. There are 4 campuses in France (Paris, Bordeaux, Lyon, Chambéry), 5 campuses abroad (Geneva, Monaco, London, San Francisco, Shanghai) and more than 340 international academic partners, with a global annual budget of €220M in 2017.

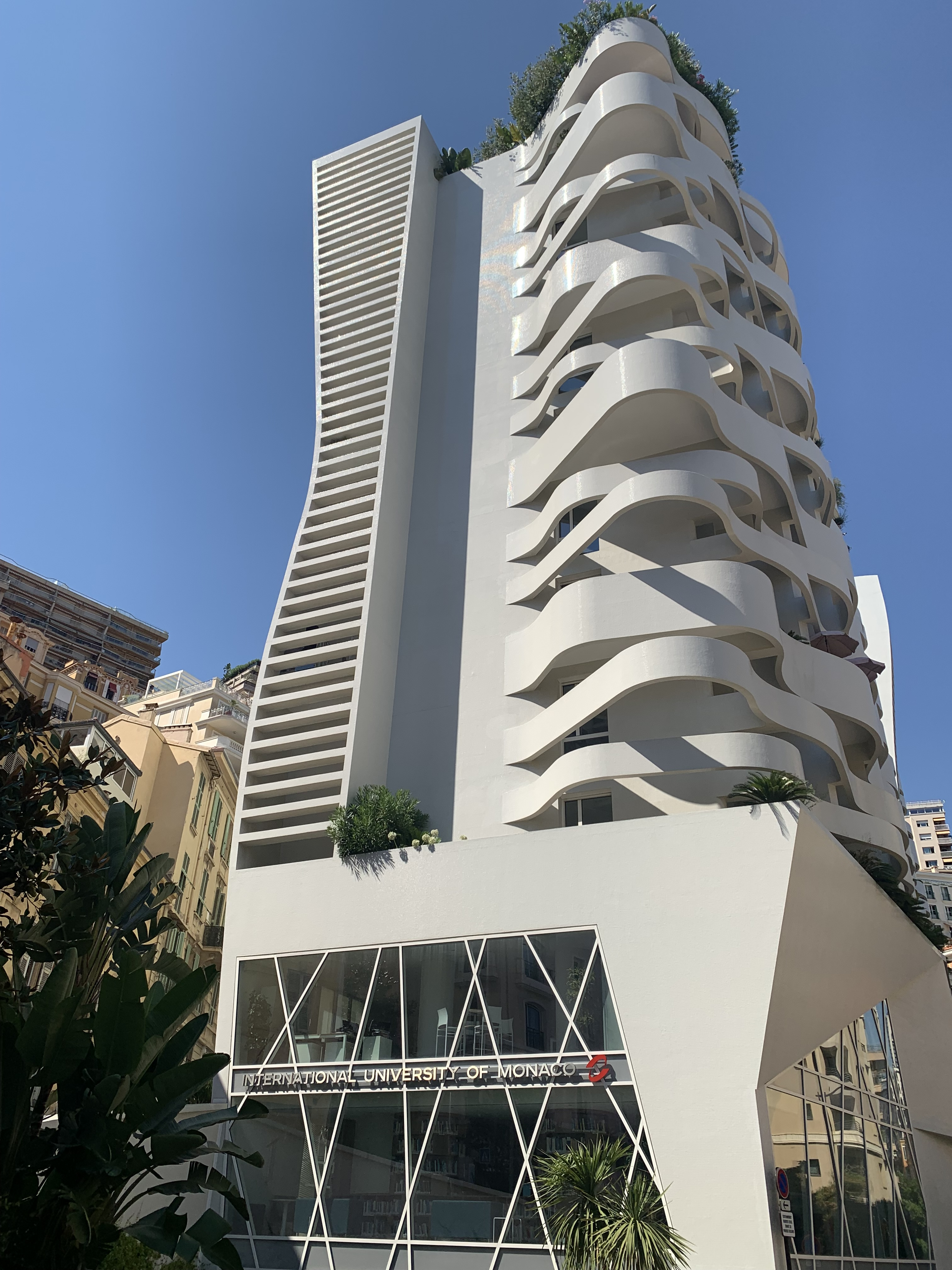
International University of Monaco (INSEEC / OMNES Education)

OMNES Education proposes a Grande École curriculum in General Management with elective classes available as part of the Grande École Programme and starting from the first year of the Grande École Master's Degree. For more specialised and non-Grande École curricula, INSEEC U. provides master's degrees and MBAs in Wine and Spirits, Digital Media, Real Estate, Health Management, Luxury Management, Sports, Engineering, Journalism and Political Sciences. This incremental strategy has been possible via the numerous acquisitions of the group since its establishment in 1975.

=== Grandes Écoles and engineering schools ===
Name	Foundation	Field	Students	Campus
INSEEC Business School, called INSEEC School of Business and Economics since 2018	1975	Business and economics	1,145	Paris, Bordeaux, Lyon, London and San Francisco.
École supérieure de commerce de Chambéry Savoie (ESC Chambéry)	1992	Business and economics	1,000	Chambéry
International University of Monaco	1986	Business and economics	620	Monaco
ESCE International Business School	1968	Business and economics	2,500	Paris, Lyon, London and San Francisco.
European Business School Paris (EBS)	1967	Business and economics	1,600	Paris
European Business School Genève (EBS Geneva)		Business and economics		Geneva
École centrale d'électronique de Paris (ECE)	1919	Engineering	2,500	Paris
ECE Tech	2013	Technology		Paris

=== Other higher education institutes and schools ===
Name	Foundation	Field	Students	Campus
Hautes Études Internationales et Politiques (HEIP)	1899	Politics and sociology		Paris
Centre d’Études Diplomatiques et Stratégiques (CEDS)	1986	Science and engineering		
Prépa Saint Germain		Politics		
Sup de Pub		Advertising and communication		
Sup de Création		Art and design		
CRÉA Geneva		Marketing, communication and art		
Sup Digital		Digital marketing, e-commerce		
EU BUSINESS SCHOOL	1973	Business School	3000	Geneva, Barcelona, Munich, Online
INSEEC Bachelor (former Paris Business College)	1899	Politics and sociology		Paris
INSEEC MSc & MBA		Business and marketing		
BBA INSEEC (former École de commerce européenne)	1986	Science and engineering		Lyon, Bordeaux
IFG Executive Education (former Institut Français de Gestion)		Business and economics		Paris

== University rankings ==
Eduniversal, is a university ranking business by the French consulting company and rating agency SMBG specialized in Higher Education. In terms of Dean's recommendation, INSEEC scores from 51 to 84‰ and cumulates "three Eduniversal palms". INSEEC has been thus bestowed the title "Excellent Business School" by Eduniversal. Deans' recommendation of the INSEEC School of Business and Economics from 2011 until 2019, as part of the Eduniversal ranking done yearly by SMBG, a French consultancy.

INSEEC ranked 7th out of 60 universities in a ranking from Canévet & Associates, a French consultancy. The main criterion of the ranking was the employability of alumni in the top 25 most attractive companies in France. The Grande École INSEEC School of Business & Economics ranked 7th out of 60 in the ranking: "Best Universities to work in one of the 25 most attractive companies in France."

The Professional ranking of world universities measures the capacity of a university to generate Forbes Fortune 500 CEOs. It is yearly done by the French Grande École Engineering School: École des Mines de Paris – MINES ParisTech. In 2011, EBS : European Business School – INSEEC U ranked 92nd worldwide.

== Notable alumni ==
- Michel Landel, CEO of Sodexo until January 2018
- Jacques-Antoine Granjon, French entrepreneur and CEO
- Arthur Sadoun, French businessman, Chairman & CEO Publicis Group since June 2017
- Christophe Blanchet, Politician and Deputy at the French National Assembly
- Taha Essou, Famous blogger

== See also ==
- List of private universities in France
