= RWTH Aachen Faculty of Business and Economics =

Branch of Aachen University

RWTH international logo

The Faculty of Business and Economics (new name: School of Business and Economics) is one of nine faculties at the RWTH Aachen University. It was founded in 1986. Approximately 1,500 students are enrolled in the faculty. It was renamed in RWTH Aachen University School of Business and Economics in 2011.

The RWTH Aachen University's School of Business and Economics is accredited by AACSB since 2011.-

== Degrees awarded ==
The following Degrees are awarded in business administration or macroeconomics:

- Bachelor of Science
- Master of Science
- Master of Education
- Doctor

== Reputation ==
University rankings

By subject – Global & National
| QS Business & Management Studies 2020 | 151–200 | 5–6 |
| QS Economics & Econometrics 2020 | 251–300 | 12–13 |

CHE Ranking 2020 – National
Business Administration (B. / M.)
| Overall study situation | ● 2.1 | ● 1.6 |
| Research orientation | ● 2.1 | ● 1.6 |
| Support in the study entry phase | ● 12/14 pts. |
| Coursed offered | ● 2.3 | ● 1.7 |
| Teacher support | ● 2.3 | ● 1.8 |
| Doctorates per professor | ● 1.5 |
| Publications per professor | ● top group |

According to the 2020 CHE University Ranking, the Faculty of Economics one of the 15 strongest research departments of business administration in Germany. The School of Business and Economics is in the 2012 Handelsblatt BWL ranking among the top ten of the German faculties, and in the top 15 German speaking faculties.
