= Sarajevo Graduate School of Business =

- Type: Private
- Established: February, 2004
- President: Daniel Gies
- Location: Sarajevo, Bosnia and Herzegovina
- Campus: Urban
- Colors: Red and White
- Website: www.sgsb.ba

Sarajevo Graduate School of Business (SGSB) is a private university located in Sarajevo, Bosnia and Herzegovina. It was created as a collaboration with the American University of Delaware and the Bosnian University of Sarajevo. It is mainly focused on teaching for MBA business degrees. The school has been in partnership with a number of American based universities throughout its existence.

== History ==
The Sarajevo Graduate School of Business was founded in 2004 as a result of a partnership between the American University of Delaware and the Bosnian University of Sarajevo. The University of Delaware wanted to build upon its links in the area that it established in 1992 during the partial breakup of Socialist Federal Republic of Yugoslavia. The establishment of the school was supplemented by a four-year $10 million contract from the United States Agency for International Development. Originally the students would study for degrees from Delaware and Sarajevo. In 2008, the Sarajevo Graduate School of Business partnered with the American Henderson State University to offer business degrees to American students that would study in Bosnia and Herzegovina.

In 2009, the school started to offer MBAs issued by Texas A&M University. However, Texas A&M's Commerce department failed to gain approval from the Board of Regents of the Texas A&M University System. As a result, Texas A&M announced in 2012 that their educational programme in Sarajevo would be closed after all the students had received their diplomas.
