= EADA Business School =

Business school in Barcelona, Catalonia, Spain

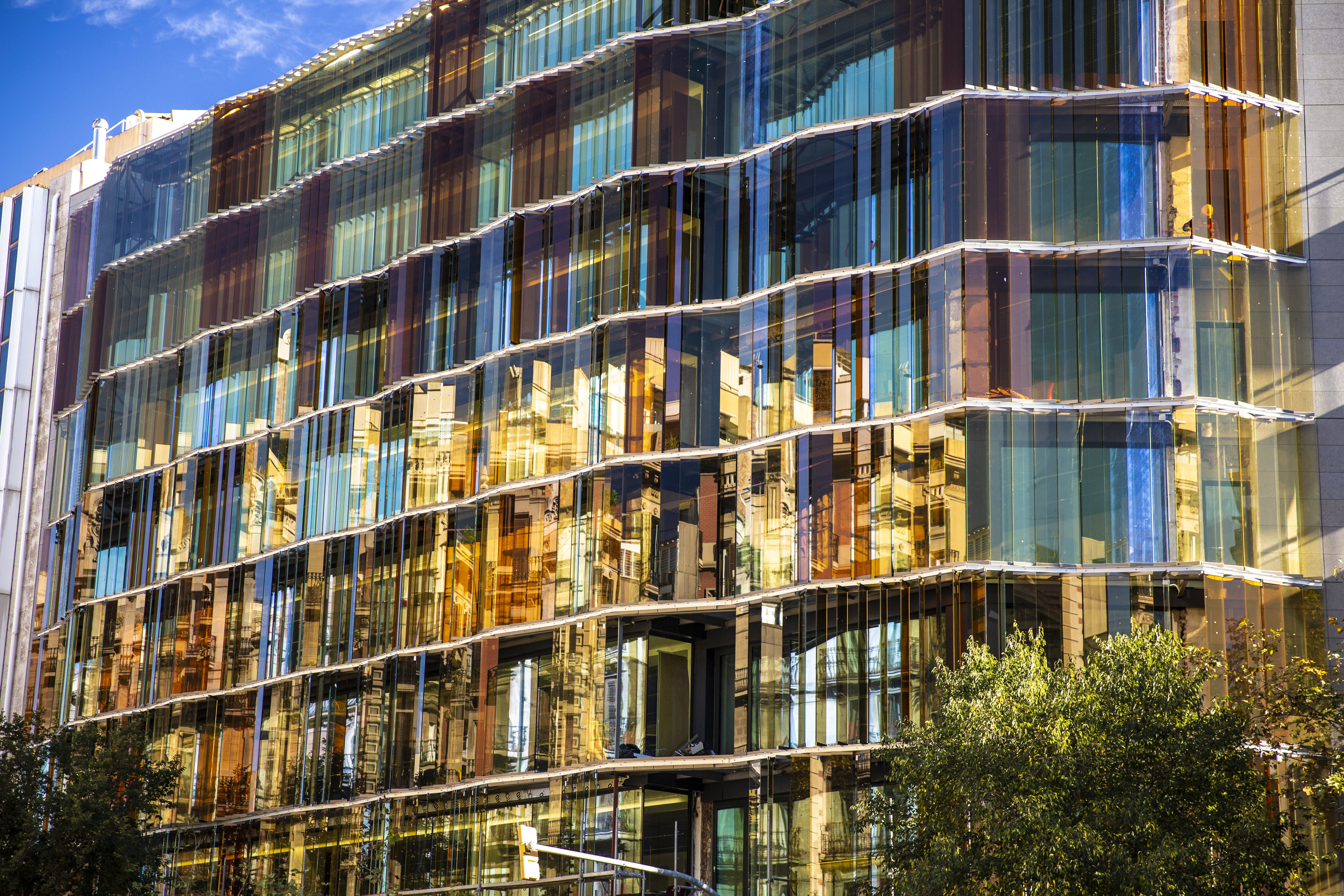
- Barcelona City Centre Campus 2019
- Other names: Fundación Privada Universitaria EADA
- Former names: Escuela de Alta Dirección y Administración
- Motto: Where Business People Grow
- Type: Business School
- Established: 1957
- President: Jordi Pursals
- Dean: Jordi Díaz
- Director: Isabel Jiménez Calaf
- Location: Barcelona, Catalonia, Spain; 41.3879°N 2.1593°E
- Campus: Urban and Mountain
- Website: www.eada.edu/en
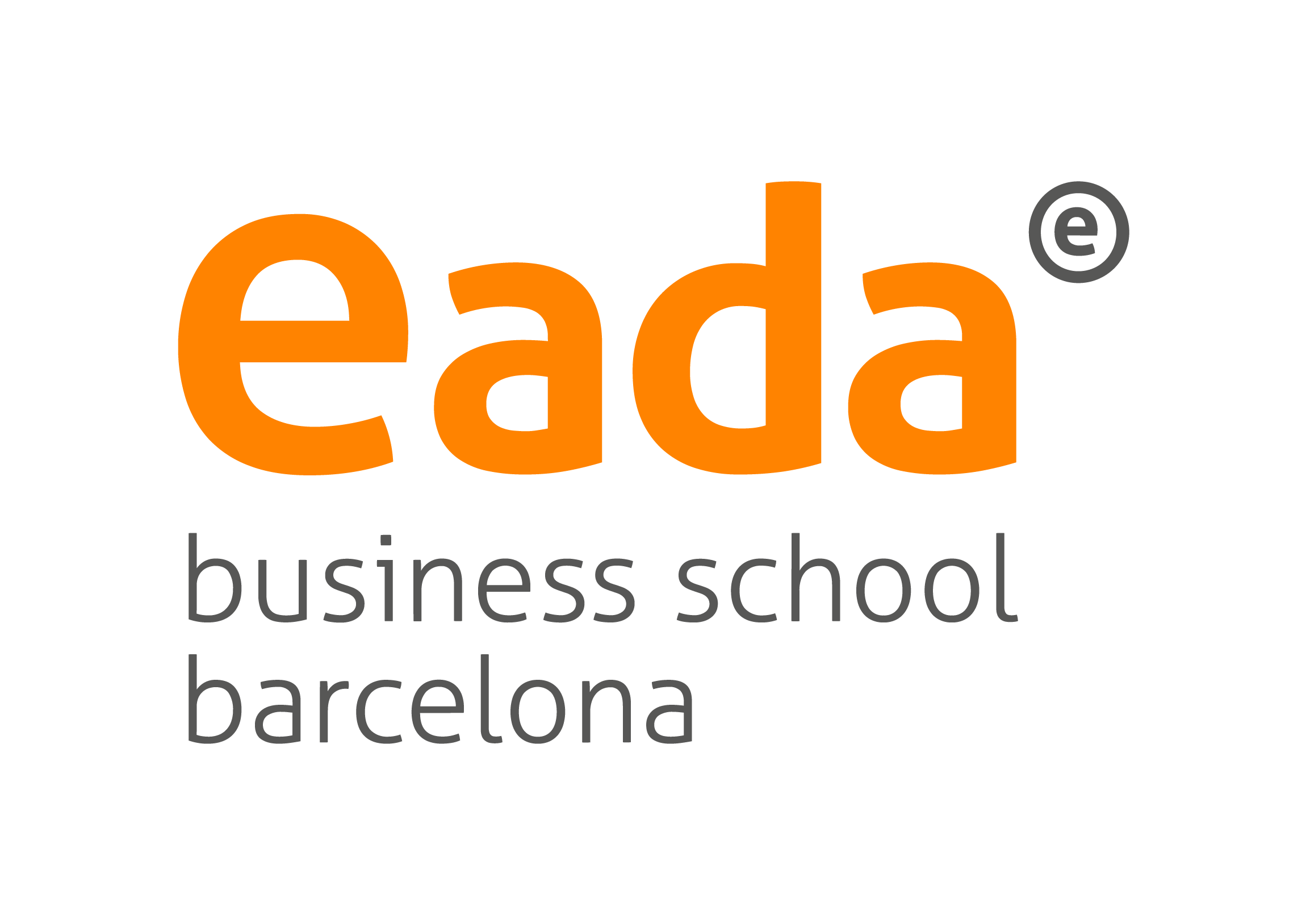

EADA Business School (Spanish: Escuela de Alta Dirección y Administración) is an international business school located in Barcelona. It was founded in 1957, and became one of the first Spanish institutions to run manager training programs for the business community. EADA Business School is one of the few business schools in Spain which has Financial Times ranking and is a member of CFA Institute partner program. Its degrees are granted by the University of Vic - Central University of Catalonia.

== Background ==
In its first two years, EADA was set up as a consultancy in business management and administration. It was founded by Arturo Alsina and Irene Vázquez in 1957. Two years later, it extended its activities to continuous specialist training in the field of business management and administration. In 1967, it became a public limited company, the shareholders were its founders, faculty and non-faculty personnel were working for the institution. After 1990, EADA moved to the Aragó Street building and also acquired the Collbató Residential Center. Since 1999, the school has reinforced its presence in the Latin American market and has set up various branches in different countries.

EADA is a private university foundation.

== Academic units ==
EADA runs Full-time and part-time master's courses in different management areas, including marketing, human resources, finance, and operations. EADA also runs high level training courses for executives: a general management program (set up in 1967) for senior managers and a management and administration program for junior and middle managers. EADA also runs manager development programs.

== MBA Programme ==
EADA business school runs various MBA programs.

- LeadTech Global Executive MBA offered jointly with the Ecole du Ponts in Paris (English)
- Global executive MBA (English)
- Executive MBA (Spanish)
- MBA international (Spanish & English)
- MBA part-time (Spanish)

== See also ==
- List of business schools in Europe
- Business School
- Master of Business Administration
