= Open School of Management =

Information
- Type: Business education, Distance education
- Enrollment: ~1,200 (2015)
- Website: http://www.openschoolofmanagement.com

The Open School of Management is a post-secondary, non-tertiary business education institution with branches in Berlin and New York City.

== Certificate in Management ==
The school offers a distance and online program in management with a recommended duration of one year which can be extended to two years. The course leads to a Certificate in Management according to ISCED Level 4.

The course is authorized by the ZFU, the German state central agency for distance education.

== Curriculum ==
The curriculum is customizable and can be personalized by selecting course modules based on the student's prior knowledge and professional objectives.

The course offers modules in the following areas: general management, organization, human resource management, marketing, special areas of management, management theories, and case studies in different industries.

== Notable Module Autors ==
Many professors and lecturers teach at internationally recognized schools that rank among the best universities in the world. This includes for example (alphabetically): ESCP Europe, Harvard Business School, HEC Paris, Cambridge Judge Business School, MIT Sloan, NUS Business School, Rotterdam School of Management, Saïd Business School, Wharton School, etc.

- Joshua Ackerman, MIT Sloan, Consumer Behavior
- Roberto Garcia-Castro, IESE Business School, Business Ethics
- Mauro Guillén, Wharton School, International Management
- Francesca Gino, Harvard Business School, Human Relations and Behavioral Theory
- Bertrand Moingeon, HEC Paris, Organizational Learning
- Jochen Menges, WHU, Leadership
- Jeffrey Pfeffer, Stanford University, Path Dependence Theory
