= New European College =

Coordinates: 48.0933°N 11.5398°E

- Motto: The Genuine Business School
- Type: Private Business school
- Established: 2014
- Chancellor: Sascha Liebhardt
- Students: ~200
- Location: Munich, Bavaria, Germany
- Campus: Urban
- Language: English
- Colors: Orange
- Website: new-european-college.com
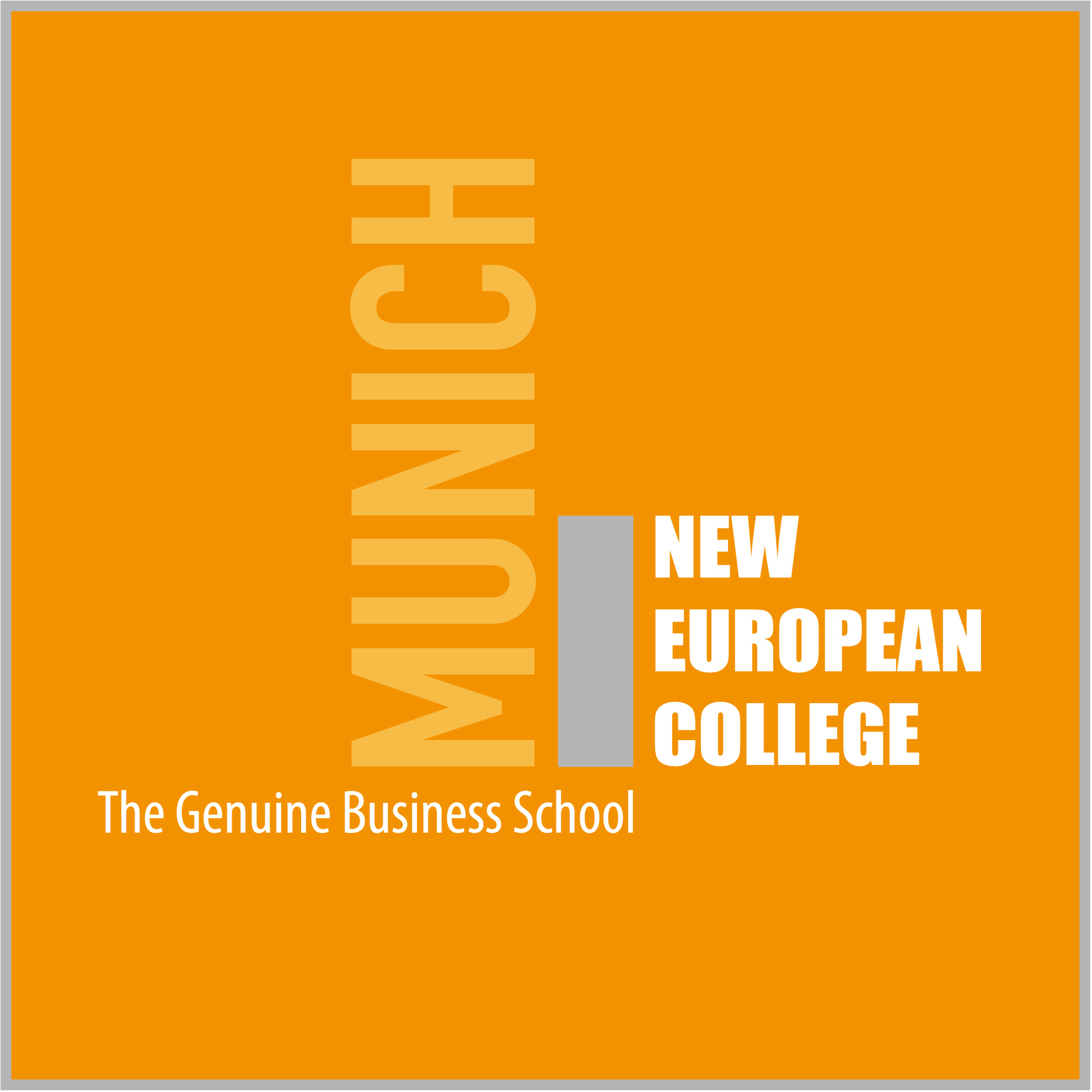

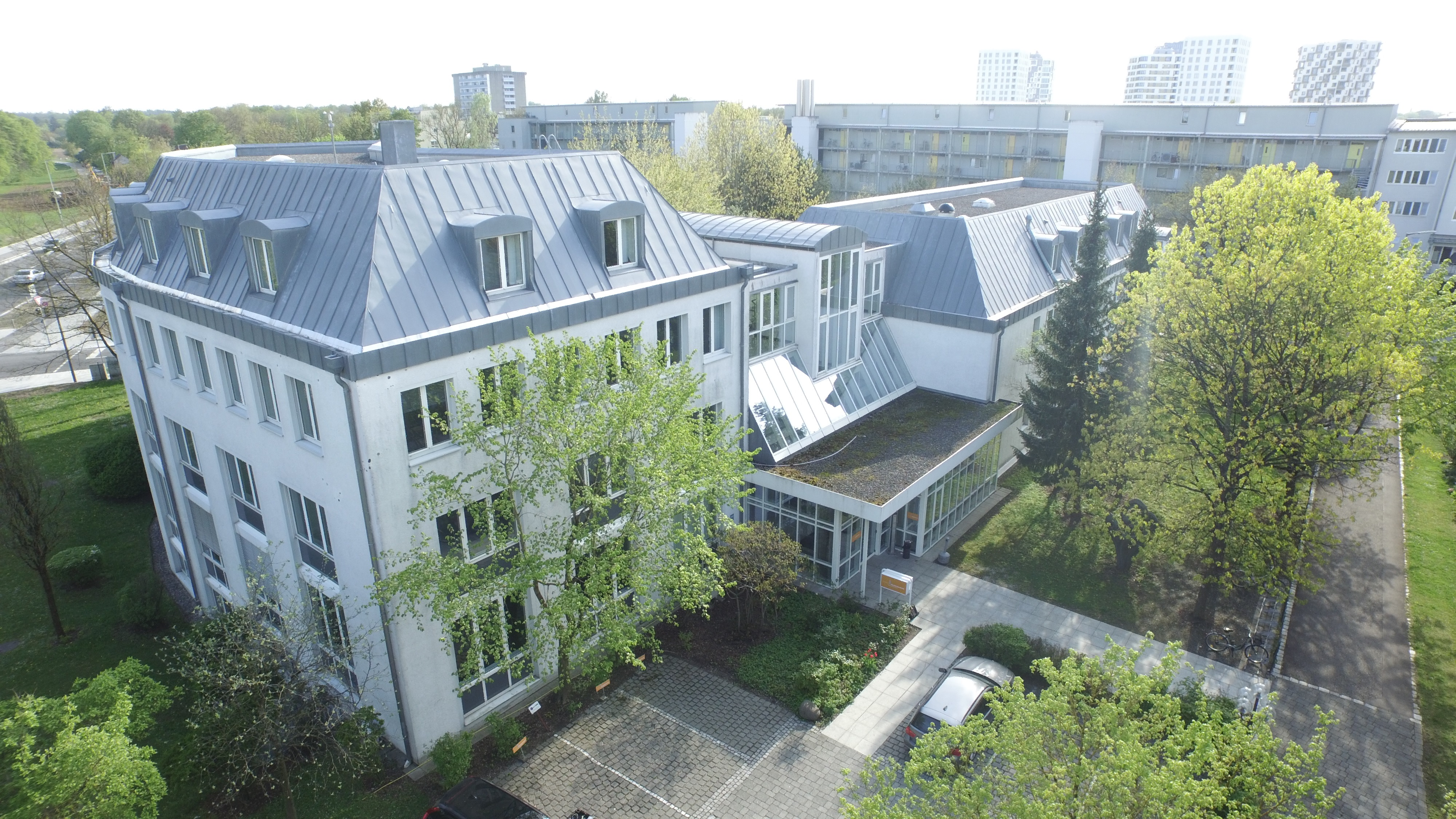
Campus New European College Munich

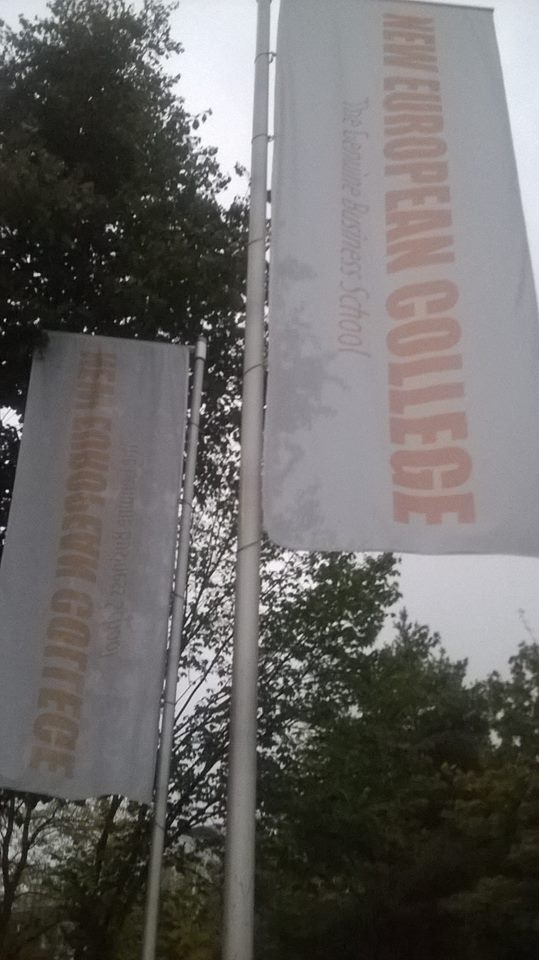
New European College's flags

New European College is a private international business school in Munich, Germany, that offers state-accredited university programs in business administration and international management in English.

== History ==
Established in 2014, New European College was authorized in 2015 by the Bavarian Ministry of Education, based on the academic agreement (approved by the North Rhine-Westphalian Ministry of Sciences) with the International University Bad Honnef, to hold university courses and examinations. Since 2020, the New European College has the also the authorization by the Bavarian Ministry of Education to host the campus of Wittenborg University of Applied Sciences from the Netherlands in Munich.

== Accreditation ==
The academic degrees offered by New European College are awarded by the International University of Applied Sciences Bad Honnef (IU) and have full German state accreditation. IU formerly known as International University of Applied Sciences Bad Honnef is officially recognized in Germany as higher education institution and has the privilege to award academic degrees - undergraduate and graduate. Furthermore IUBH is accredited with the Foundation of International Business Administration Accreditation (FIBAA) and the German Council of Science and Humanities (Wissenschaftsrat). The academic degrees of Wittenborg University of Applied Sciences are accredited by NVAO and FIBAA. Wittenborg University of Applied Sciences fulfills all requirements of the Dutch government and is recognized as university of applied sciences in the Netherlands.

== Academic programs ==
=== Undergraduate Degrees ===
- Bachelor of Business Administration (BBA) - 6 to 8 semester program, 180 ECTS
  - Pathways:
    - International Business Administration
      - Specialisations:
        - Economics & Management
        - Financial Services Management
    - Marketing, Communication and Information
      - Specialisations:
        - Marketing & Communication

=== Graduate Degrees ===
- Master of Business Management (MBM) - 3 semester program, 90 ECTS
  - Specializations:
    - Entrepreneurship & Innovation
    - Digital Marketing & Communication
- Master of Business Administration (MBA) - 3 semester program, 90 ECTS
  - Specializations:
    - International Management
    - Finance
    - Entrepreneurship & Innovation

=== Undergraduate degrees ===
- Bachelor of Arts (B.A.) in International Management - 6 semester program, 180 ECTS
  - Specializations:
    - Accounting & Finance
    - International Marketing
    - Human Resource Management

=== Graduate degrees ===
- Master of Arts (M.A.) in International Management - 4 semester program, 120 ECTS
  - Specializations:
    - International Marketing
    - Accounting & Finance
    - International Human Resource Management
    - Hospitality Management
    - IT Management
- Master of Arts for Non-Business Graduates (M.A) in International Management - 5 semester program, 120 ECTS
  - Specializations:
    - International Marketing
    - Accounting & Finance
    - International Human Resource Management
    - Hospitality Management
    - IT Management
- Master of Business Administration (MBA) in International Business - 3 semester program, 90 ECTS
  - Specializations:
    - International Marketing
    - Accounting & Finance
    - Hospitality Management
    - IT Management
- Accelerated Master of Business Administration (MBA) in International Business - 2 semester program, 60 ECTS

== Campus ==
The NEC Campus is located on the western upper bank of the river Isar in the southern part of Munich. It is 15 minutes away from the city centre of Munich by public transport. Private student dormitories are located in 10 minutes walking distance from the campus.

== Job seeker's visa ==
Since August 2012, foreign students (non-EU citizenship) can, upon successful completion of their studies at an accredited German university, extend their residence permit for 18 months to seek employment in Germany.
