= Leonardo Da Vinci University =

Coordinates: 8.1150°S 79.0341°W

- Universidad Leonardo Da Vinci
- Type: Private
- Established: April 8, 2010
- Rector: Dr. Guillermo Gil Malca
- Address: España Avenue N° 163 Trujillo - Perú, Trujillo, Peru
- Affiliations: website=

The Leonardo Da Vinci University is a Peruvian private university founded on April 1, 2010, in the city of Trujillo, La Libertad Region. This institution of higher learning has its headquarters in the city of Trujillo.

== History ==
The Leonardo Da Vinci University was authorized to develop its academic activities in the city of Trujillo on April 8, 2010, the operation was authorized by Resolution No. 202-2010-CONAFU. In December 2019, the university was denied institutional license due to the fact it did not comply to 28 of the 42 indicators to be able to uphold to the educational quality standards (El Peruano,2019).

== Careers ==
- Business Management and Services
- Accounting and Corporate Finance
- Law and Business
- Systems Engineering and Information Technology
- Marketing and International Business.

== See also ==
- National University of Trujillo
- Cesar Vallejo University
- Private University of the North
