= Dominick Salvatore =

American economist (1940–2026)

- Born: May 23, 1940
- Died: January 27, 2026 (aged 85)

Academic background
- Education: City College of New York (BA); City University of New York (MA) (PhD)
- Doctoral advisor: Edwin P. Reubens

Academic work
- Discipline: International Economics
- Institutions: Fordham University
- Website: Information at IDEAS / RePEc

Dominick Salvatore (May 23, 1940 – January 28, 2026) was an American economist who was a distinguished professor at Fordham University, an honorary professor at Shanghai Finance University, Hunan University, and University of Pretoria, Director of the Global Economic Policy Center and a Fellow of the American Association for the Advancement of Science and New York Academy of Sciences. He authored "International Economics". He died on January 28, 2026, at the age of 85.
