= Magna Carta College =

- Established: 2008
- Dean: Prof. David O Faulkner
- Location: Whichford House, John Smith Drive, Oxford, England; 51.7308°N 1.20566°W
- Website: www.magnacartacollege.ac.uk
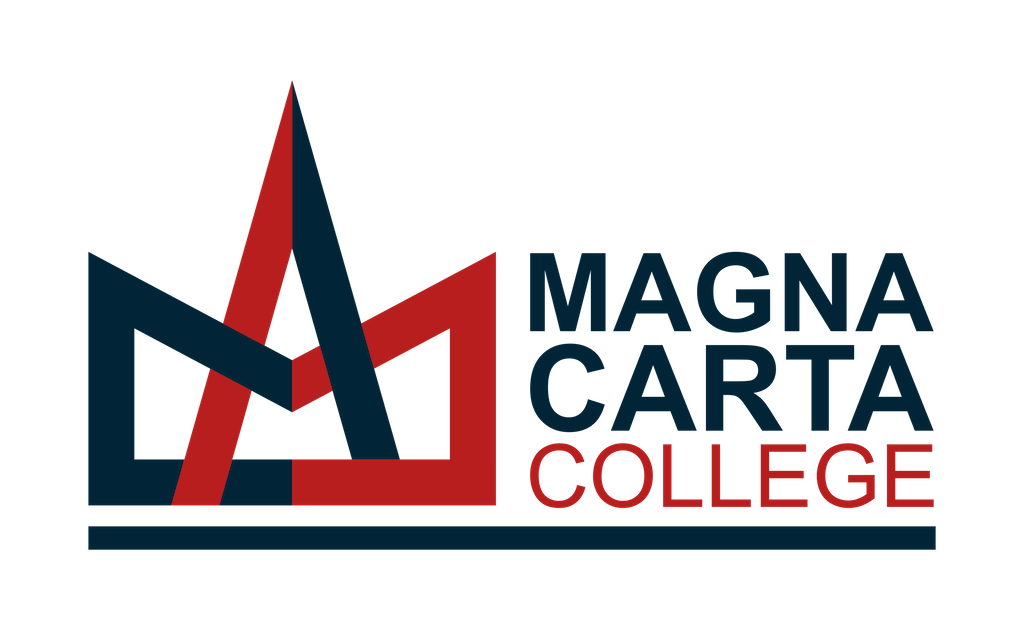

Magna Carta College (also known as Magna Carta College, Oxford and formerly as GBSO) is an independent business school in Oxford, United Kingdom.

== Accreditation ==
Magna Carta College programmes were, until April 2015, accredited through the University of Buckingham and were previously accredited through the University of Wales until 2011, when the University of Wales announced that it would cease to act as an accrediting body for other universities. Students who had registered for accredited courses at the time of the announcement could remain on their University of Wales course until graduation.

Between 2013 and 2016 the college was acquired and run by a team of investors, ceasing all involvement or association with Magna Carta College in Nov 2016.

In 2017 the founder and the original academic faculty reacquired the name, and relaunched the school, to coincide with the partnership with London Metropolitan University to deliver an online (blended learning) MBA programme, leading to a degree award by London Met.

== Associated organisations ==
Magna Carta College has affiliations or partnerships with the following organisations

- Buckinghamshire New University
- London Metropolitan University
- Pearson
