= European College of Business and Management =

Coordinates: 51.52517°N 0.08217°W

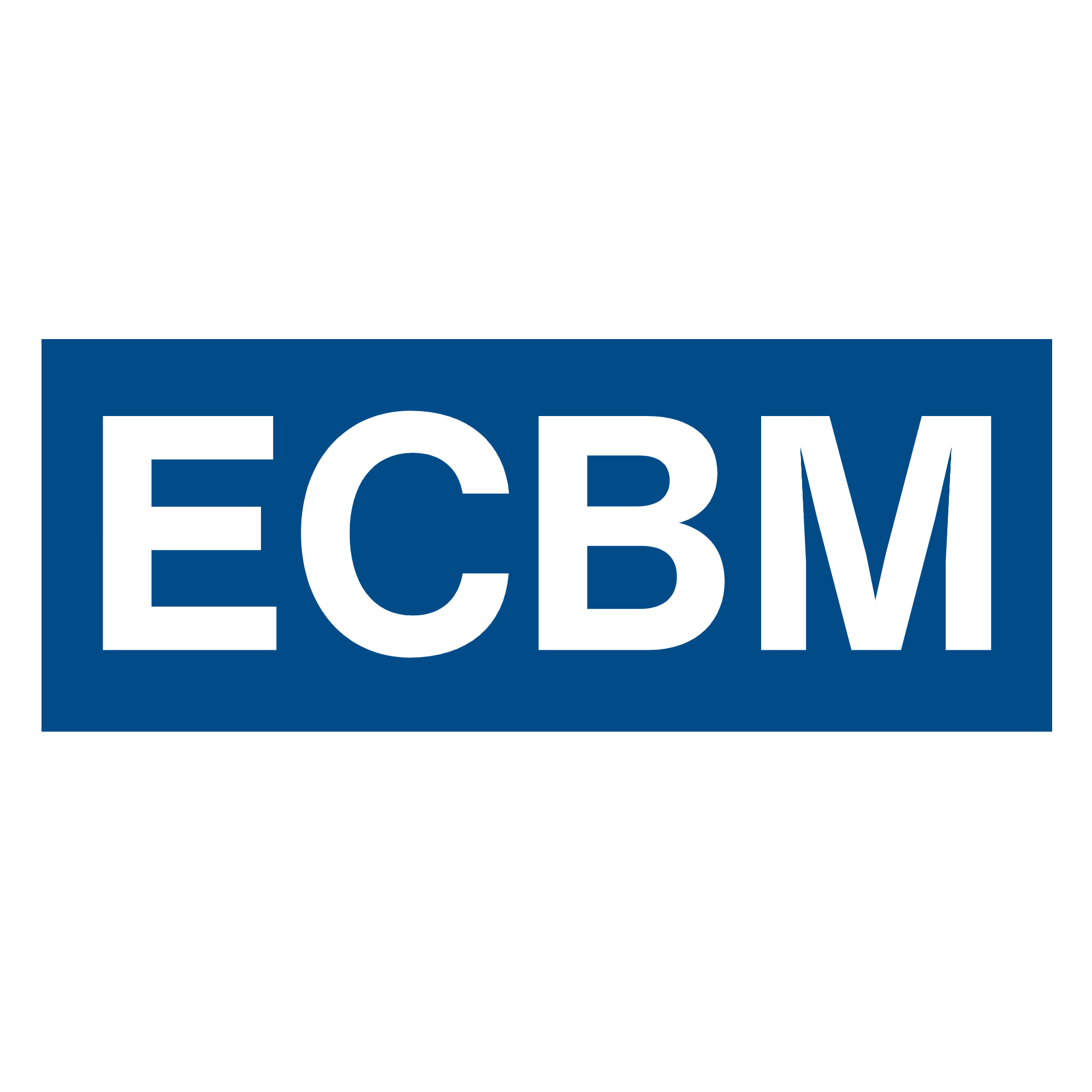
- Logo of the European College of Business and Management
- Other names: ECBM
- Former names: European Vocational College
- Established: 1988
- Parent institution: German-British Chamber of Industry and Commerce
- Director: Catherine Heming
- Location: 69-71 Great Eastern Street, London, United Kingdom
- Language: English
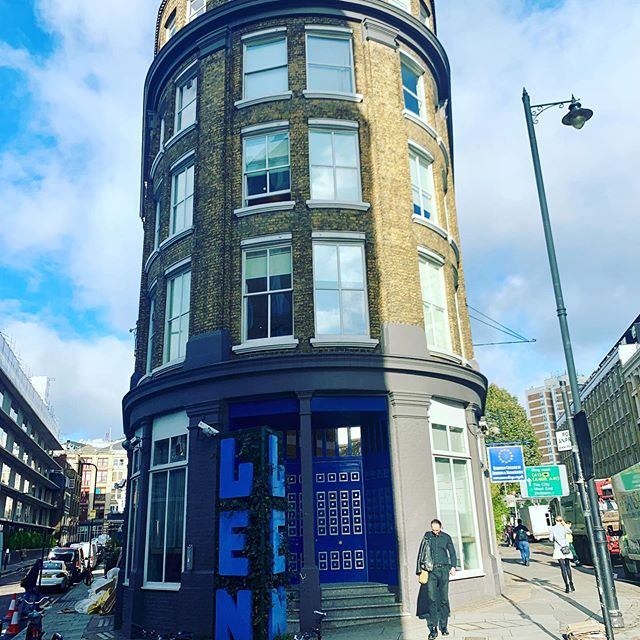

The European College of Business and Management was established in 1988 and is the training arm of the German-British Chamber of Industry and Commerce in London. It is located in the heart of London.

The college provides international accredited business and management programmes. It has developed various partnerships with Chambers of Commerce within Europe and is supported by globally recognised companies.

It specialises in providing opportunities for the German market, based on programmes offered by its partner universities in the UK.

== Programmes ==
Programmes offered by the ECBM include:

=== Professional development ===
- Professional Development Programmes
  - This can lead to a Kaufmann/-frau International Certificate, awarded by the German-British Chamber of Industry & Commerce.
- German-British Chamber of Industry and Commerce language certificate, awarded by the German-British Chamber of Industry & Commerce.
- Recognition of IHK Certificates

=== Undergraduate programmes ===
- BA (Hons) Business Management (Top-up), part-time programme, accredited by University of South Wales.
- BSc (Hons) International Business and Management, part-time programme, accredited by Liverpool John Moores University.
- Higher National Diploma

=== Postgraduate programmes ===
- MSc International Business and Management, accredited by Liverpool John Moores University.
- Master of Business Administration (MBA), accredited by Liverpool John Moores University.

The undergraduate and postgraduate programmes are delivered in English via "Blended Learning", a combination of virtual distance learning and physical resources. The teaching sessions mainly take place on weekend seminars in Germany and London
