= Leeds Business School =

- Type: Business School
- Dean: Dr George Lodorfos
- Administrative staff: 300
- Students: 5,500
- Location: Leeds, England; 53.8029°N 1.548°W
- Website: www.leedsbeckett.ac.uk/leeds-business-school/

Leeds Business School is one of 13 Schools within Leeds Beckett University, located in Leeds, West Yorkshire, England. Leeds Business School is divided into six subject groups, which deliver a range of undergraduate, postgraduate, professional and short courses in Accounting & Finance, Business Strategy Operations & Enterprise, Economics Analytics and International Business, Leadership Governance & People Management, Marketing, and PR & Journalism. Leeds Business School is located in the Rose Bowl in heart of Leeds city centre.

Leeds Business School courses are taught across the world through international partnerships with organisations such as the Academy of Finance in Vietnam, the Sino-British College in Shanghai, the Vocational Training College of Hong Kong and the Polytechnic of Namibia

The Retail Institute within Leeds Business School is the UK's only academic research centre that leads the consumer experiences of the future in retail, food and packaging. The Centre for Governance, Leadership and Global Responsibility which seeks to explore the integration of cognate concepts such as CSR business ethics, integrity, identity, reputation, responsible governance and leadership, and The Leadership Centre are also within Leeds Business School.

== Research Institutes & Centres ==
The research community at Leeds Beckett University is constantly evolving and growing. The following are located within Leeds Business School:

- The Retail Institute
- The Centre for Governance, Leadership and Global Responsibility
- The Leadership Centre

== Location ==
Leeds Business School is based at the Rose Bowl, in Leeds City Centre. Opened in May 2009, the Rose Bowl is home to over 5,500 students, 82 support staff and over 250 academic staff.

== See also ==
- List of business schools in Europe
