= EU Business School =

Pan-european private Business School

- Logo of EU Business School
- Other name: EU
- Motto: A European Identity - A Global Network
- Type: Business school
- Established: 1973
- Chairman: Mireille Messine
- Students: 3,000
- Location: Geneva (Switzerland); Barcelona (Spain); Munich (Germany)
- Campus: Urban
- Website: Euruni.edu

EU Business School is a private for-profit business school with 2 campuses in Geneva (Switzerland), 3 in Barcelona (Spain), 1 in Munich (Germany) as well as a digital campus.

Founded in 1973 as "European University", the institution offers foundation, bachelor's, master's, MBA and doctoral programs taught in English. The school is headquartered in Switzerland and focuses on international business education.

It is a member of OMNES Education Group since 2022.

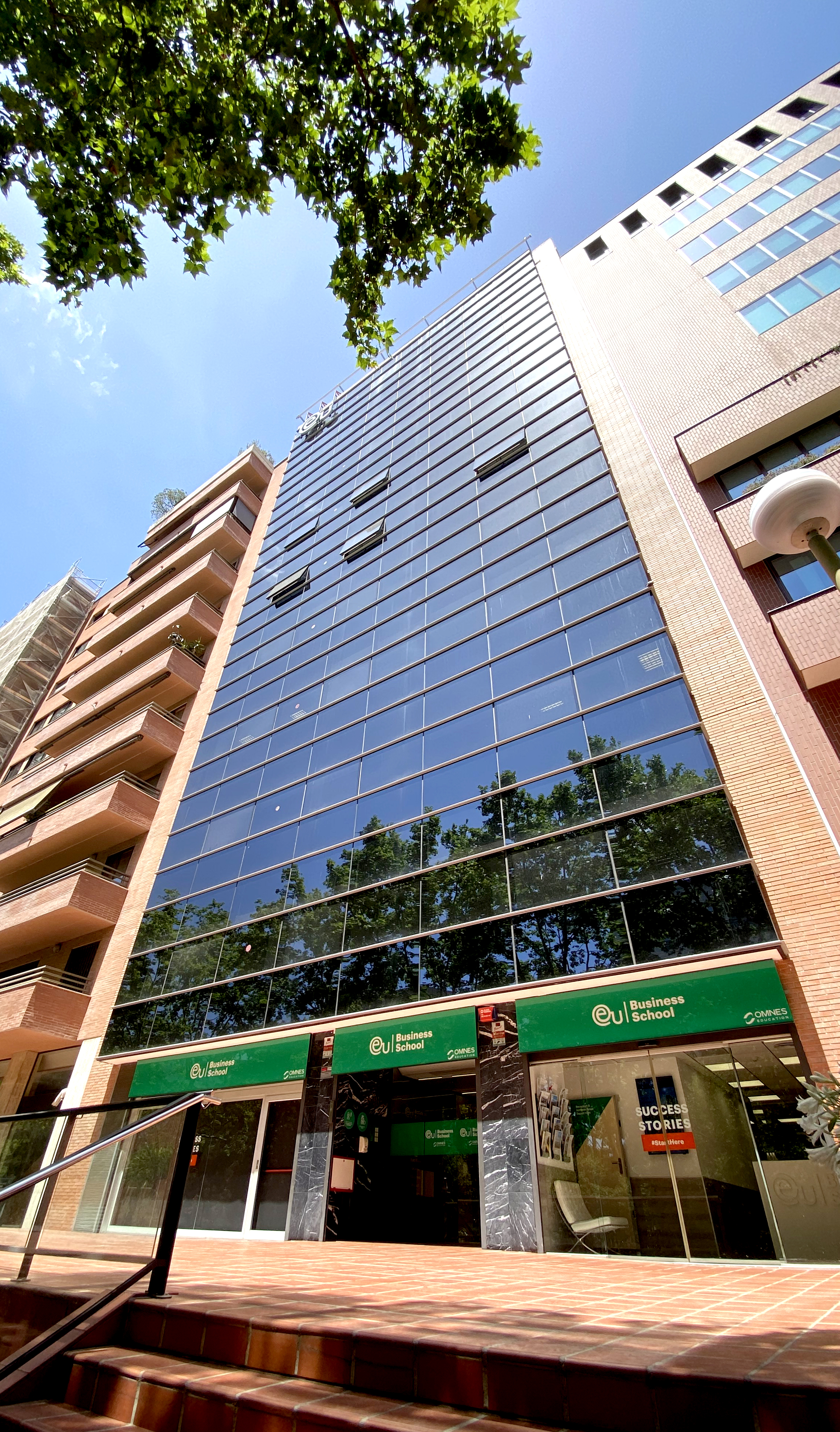
EU Business School Barcelona - Diagonal Building

== History ==
EU Business School was established in 1973, as a private school in Antwerp, Belgium. Set up by Xavier Nieberding, it provided management education. However, as the school was not a Flemish accredited educational establishment, it was not able to award academic degrees. A student revolt, and the associated negative press coverage, led to the closing of the school in 1998.

The school was acquired by Dirk Craen in 1999. In 2014, the institution changed its name from ''European University'' to ''EU Business School''.

In January 2022, EU Business School joined OMNES Education Group. Its current chairman is Mireille Messine.

== Academic programs ==
EU Business School offers bachelor's, master's, MBA and doctorate degrees in Business Administration and business-related disciplines (BBA, MBA, and DBA).

Courses are taught in English and follow a semester-based academic calendar. Programs are offered across the institution’s campuses in Barcelona, Geneva and Munich, as well as through an online learning platform.

Undergraduate programs include bachelor's degrees in fields such as business administration, digital communication, international relations, sports management and digital business. As of 2022, the cost per semester for a bachelor's degree at a Geneva campus was CHF 13,900.

Graduate offerings include master's degrees and MBA programs with specializations including finance, marketing, entrepreneurship, innovation, artificial intelligence for business and international business, MSc programs and MBA programs. In collaboration with UNITAR, it offers a Master in International Relations and Diplomacy.

Students can join joint programs with state accredited universities Pace University, New York, University of California, Riverside or Monterrey Institute of Technology and Higher Education (ITESM).

== Accreditations and certifications ==
Institutional accreditation:

- International Quality Accreditation (IQA) from the Central and East European Management Development Association (CEEMAN),

Institutional certifications:

- eduQua certification, Swiss Quality Label for Adult and Further Education Institutions.
- Association to Advance Collegiate Schools of Business (AACSB) member.
- EU Business School is a signatory of the Principles for Responsible Management Education (PRME).
- EU Business School is approved for American Veteran Affairs Benefits and accepts the GI Bill.

Program accreditations:

- Across all its campuses, EU Business School offers state-recognized university degrees awarded through its academic partnerships, the University of Derby and London Metropolitan University (United Kingdom) as well as Dublin Business School (Ireland). These degrees are state-approved by the German government with a rating H+ on Anabin. EU Business School itself is however not state-approved by the German government with a rating of H- on Anabin.

== Rankings ==
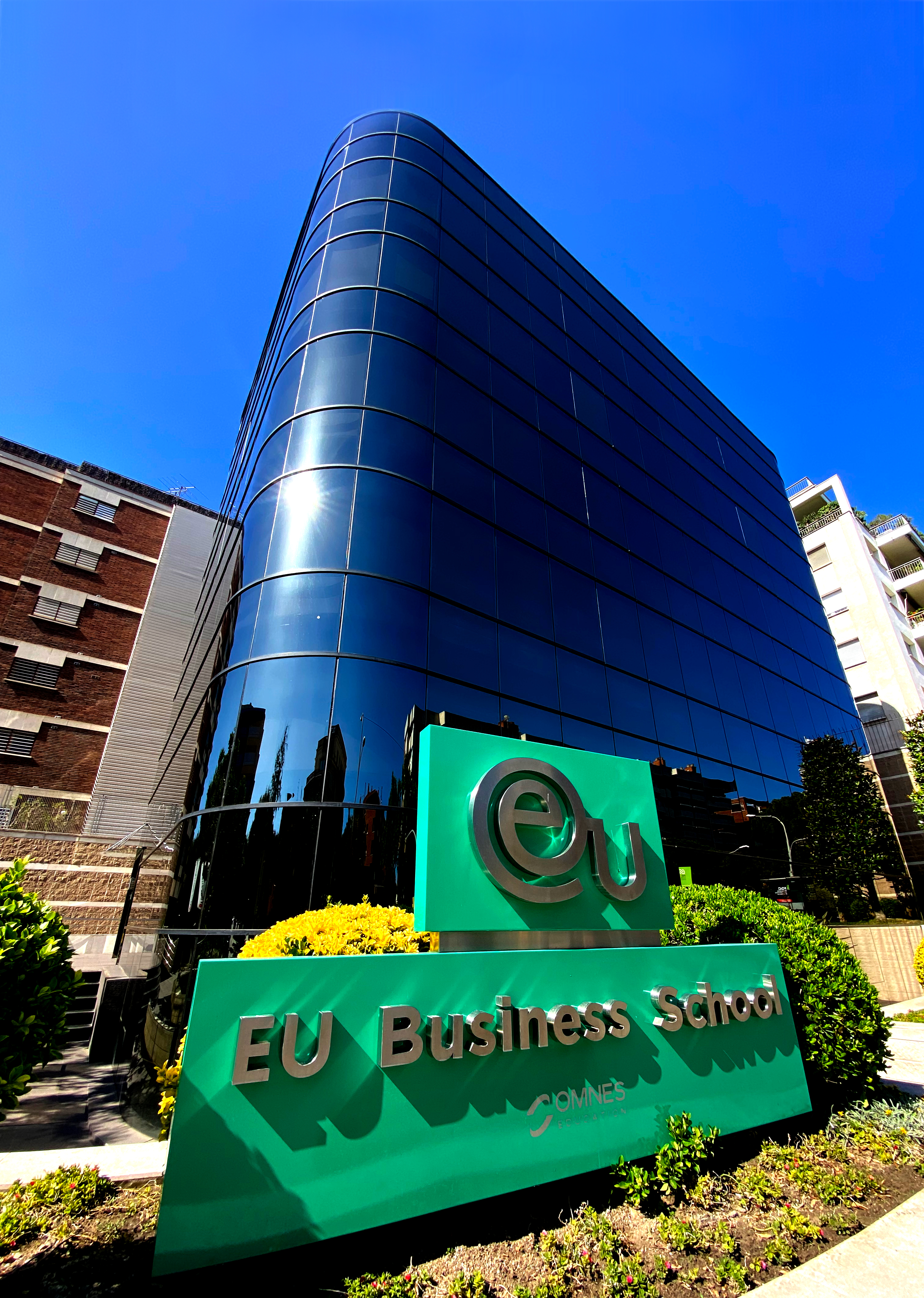
EU Business School Barcelona - Ganduxer Building

QS World University Rankings:

- 2026, The MBA ranks joint #37 in Europe and between 101-110 globally. It was #68 in the QS International Trade Ranking - Masters and MBA, and overall ranked five stars.
- 2024: EU Business School was granted a 5-Star rating (Excellent) from QS Stars; a 5-Star rating for employability; a 5-Star rating for teaching; and a 5-Star rating for Online Learning
- 2022, EU's MBA ranks in the top 40 programs worldwide and #43 in Europe. It achieves #1 place globally in class and faculty diversity and scores 99% in entrepreneurship.
- 2018, EU's online MBA is in the top 20 worldwide of its distance/online MBA ranking, achieving 100/100 for student diversity, 96/100 for class experience, and 91/100 for student quality

Other rankings:

- 2026, Forbes named EU’s MBA #2 in Spain and the institution as a top 10 business school in Spain.
- 2026, La Razón named EU Business School best business school of the year in Spain for the second year running.
- 2022, Second best MBA in Spain on Forbes list.
- 2022, América Economía lists EU's MBA as 20th in its 2022 Global Rankings.

== Industry relations ==
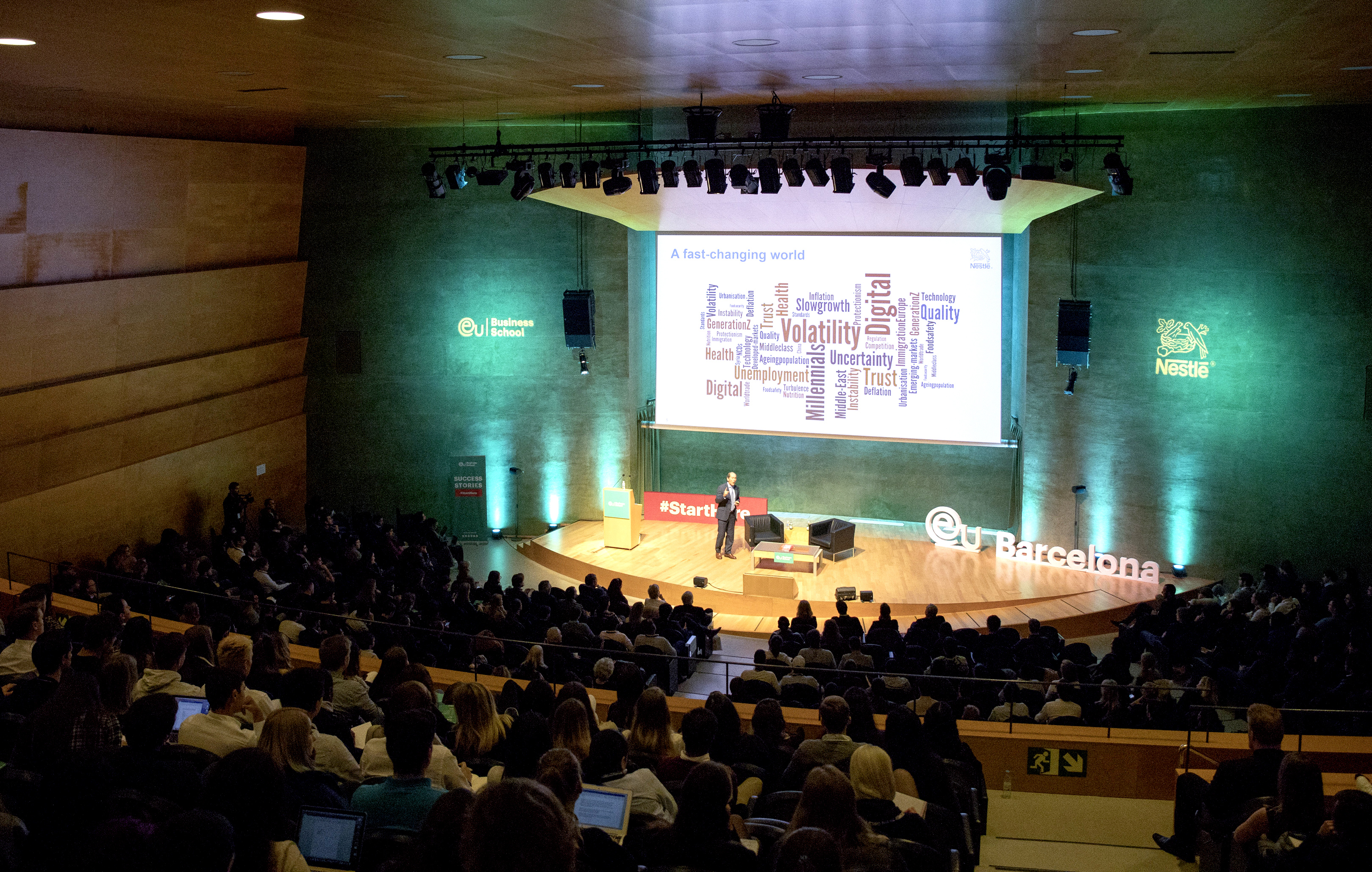
Paul Bulcke - Learning From Leaders series for EU Business School

In 2026, EU had 35,000 alumni of 162 nationalities. In 53 years of existence, EU Business School awarded 24 honorary doctoral degrees. Holders of such a degree include Nick Hayek Jr., Abel Gyozevich Aganbegyan, Alexander Vinokourov and Steve Guerdat among others. Doha Bank's CEO, Dr.Raghavan Seetharaman was awarded a PhD in Global Governance, as was former President of Switzerland Adolf Ogi.

EU Business School hosts the Learning from Leaders series, with speakers such as Jean-Claude Biver, Paul Bulcke, Guy Verhofstadt, André Hoffmann, Ronnie Leten, Alain Dehaze or Peter Brabeck-Letmathe.

== Educational affiliations ==
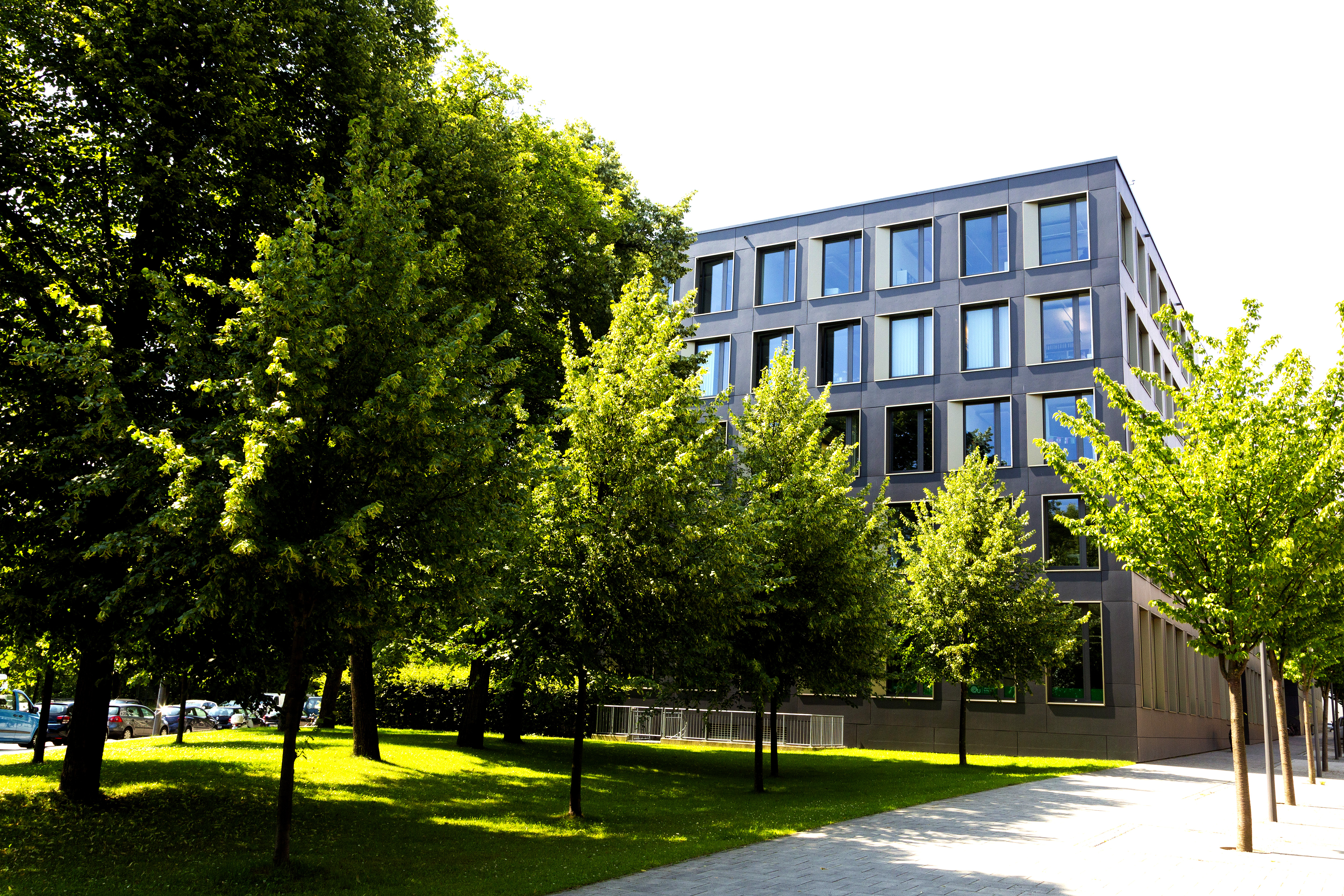
EU Business School - Munich Campus

Switzerland: Swiss Federation of Private Schools, the Geneva Association of Private Schools, the Lake Geneva Region Swiss Private Schools Association, the Geneva Chamber of Commerce sponsor (since 2013), the Swiss Private School Register (SPSR), the AVDEP (Association Vaudoise de Ecoles Privées), the Swiss Association of Private Institutions of Higher Education (ASIPES/SAPIHE), and Global Education in Switzerland (GES).

International: The Academy of Business in Society (ABIS), the European Council for Business Education, and the European Foundation for Management Development, the Hispanic Association of Colleges & Universities, el Consejo latinoamericano de Escuelas de Administración, the Society for Advancement of Management (SAM), the Educational Collaborative for International Schools (ECIS), the Mediterranean Association of International Schools (MAIS), the International Association for College Admission Counseling (IACAC), the Peter Drucker Society Europe, the Russian Association of Business Education (RABE), the International Association of University Presidents (IAUP), and Barcelona Global.

== See also ==
- List of Hospitality Management Schools in Switzerland
