= ESCE International Business School =

Business school in Paris

Coordinates: 48.891°N 2.244°E

- École Supérieure du Commerce Extérieur
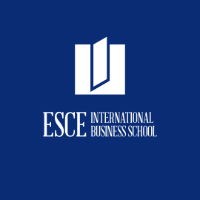
- Motto: International in any language
- Type: Grande école
- Established: 1968
- Founder: Business France
- Academic affiliations: EPAS, Conférence des Grandes Ecoles
- President: Christophe Boisseau
- Academic staff: 62 Full-Time and 220 associated
- Students: 2,500
- Location: La Défense, Lyon
- Campus: Urban
- Language: English, French
- Colors: Blue and White
- Website: www.esce.fr

ESCE International Business School (ESCE - Ecole Supérieure du Commerce Extérieur) is a business school founded in 1968 by Business France (French Office for International Trade) and located in La Défense, Paris. It has been a member of France's Conférence des Grandes Ecoles since 2012. The school has approximately 2,500 students and 9,300 Alumni.

The school offers bachelor's degrees, internationally accredited Masters in Management and Summer Programs.

Among famous speakers, former Prime Ministers Tony Blair, Jean-Pierre Raffarin, Michel Rocard and Alain Juppé contributed to conferences at ESCE.

The Paris-based business school is renowned in France and Europe for its network of entrepreneurs, who founded some notable French start-ups (Zenly, Simplified, Sixth June, Interactive Mobility...).

== Degree and Accreditation ==
The school delivers a Master in Management with EFMD EPAS accreditation as well as French Ministry of Higher Education and Research accreditation. It also cofounded the Consortium of International Double Degrees (CIDD).

ESCE specializes in International Affairs. For long it has been the most demanded school within SÉSAME Examination (famous Business School examination in France), of which it was a founding member in 1992.

It is renowned for its dual degree with Berlin School of Economics & Law as well as its dual degree with UIBE Beijing.

== Notable teachers ==
Jean-Marie Cambacérès (Associated Professor since 2010) - ENA Graduate (Promotion Voltaire), Former Congressman (député), Business Man, President of European & Global Affairs at CESE (Conseil Economique, Social et Environnemental), founder of ESCE Centre Asie.

== List of Dual Degree Programs ==
- BITS – Business And Information Technology School - (Campus Berlin & Iserlohn) (Germany)
- Berlin School of Economics and Law (Germany)
- Universidad Cardenal Herrera Ceu (Spain)
- Coastal Carolina University (USA)
- Dublin Business School - Griffith College Dublin (Ireland)
- Hochschule Augsburg – University Of Applied Sciences (Germany)
- Hochschule Mainz- University Of Applied Sciences (Germany)
- University of Karlstad (Sweden)
- Kendall College (USA)
- Linnaeus University (Sweden)
- London South Bank University (United Kingdom)
- Nicholls State University (USA)
- Nottingham Trent University (United Kingdom)
- Robert Gordon University (United Kingdom)
- Universidad Europea de Madrid (Spain)
- University of Brighton (United Kingdom)
- UIBE – University of International Business and Economics (China)
- University of Maribor (Slovenia)
- South Wales University (United Kingdom)
- University of Westminster (United Kingdom)

== Notable alumni ==
Alexandre de Rothschild, Chairman of Rothschild & Co bank.
