= Private university =

Higher education institution not operated by a government

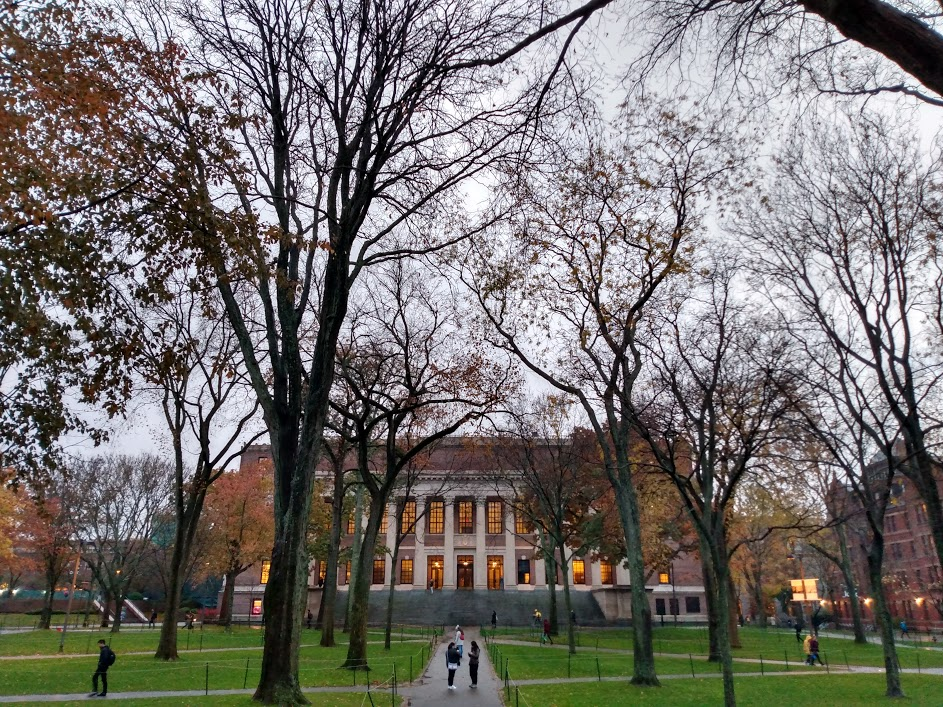
Harvard University, a private Ivy League university in Cambridge, Massachusetts, and the first university established in what became the United States

Private universities and private colleges are higher education institutions not operated, owned, or institutionally funded by governments. However, they often receive tax breaks, public student loans, and government grants. Depending on the country, private universities may be subject to government regulations. Private universities may be contrasted with public universities and national universities which are either operated, owned or institutionally funded by governments. Additionally, many private universities operate as nonprofit organizations.

Across the world, different countries have different regulations regarding accreditation for private universities and as such, private universities are more common in some countries than in others. Some countries do not have any private universities at all.

== Africa ==
=== Egypt ===
Egypt currently has 21 public universities with about two million students and 23 private universities with 60,000 students.

Egypt has many private universities including the American University in Cairo, the German University in Cairo, The British University in Egypt, the Arab Academy for Science, Technology and Maritime Transport, Misr University for Science and Technology, Misr International University, Future University in Egypt and the Modern Sciences and Arts University.

In addition to the state-funded national and private universities in Egypt, international university institutions were founded in the New Administrative Capital and are hosting branches of Universities from abroad. The Knowledge Hub (TKH) and European Universities in Egypt (EUE) are among these institutions.

=== Ethiopia ===
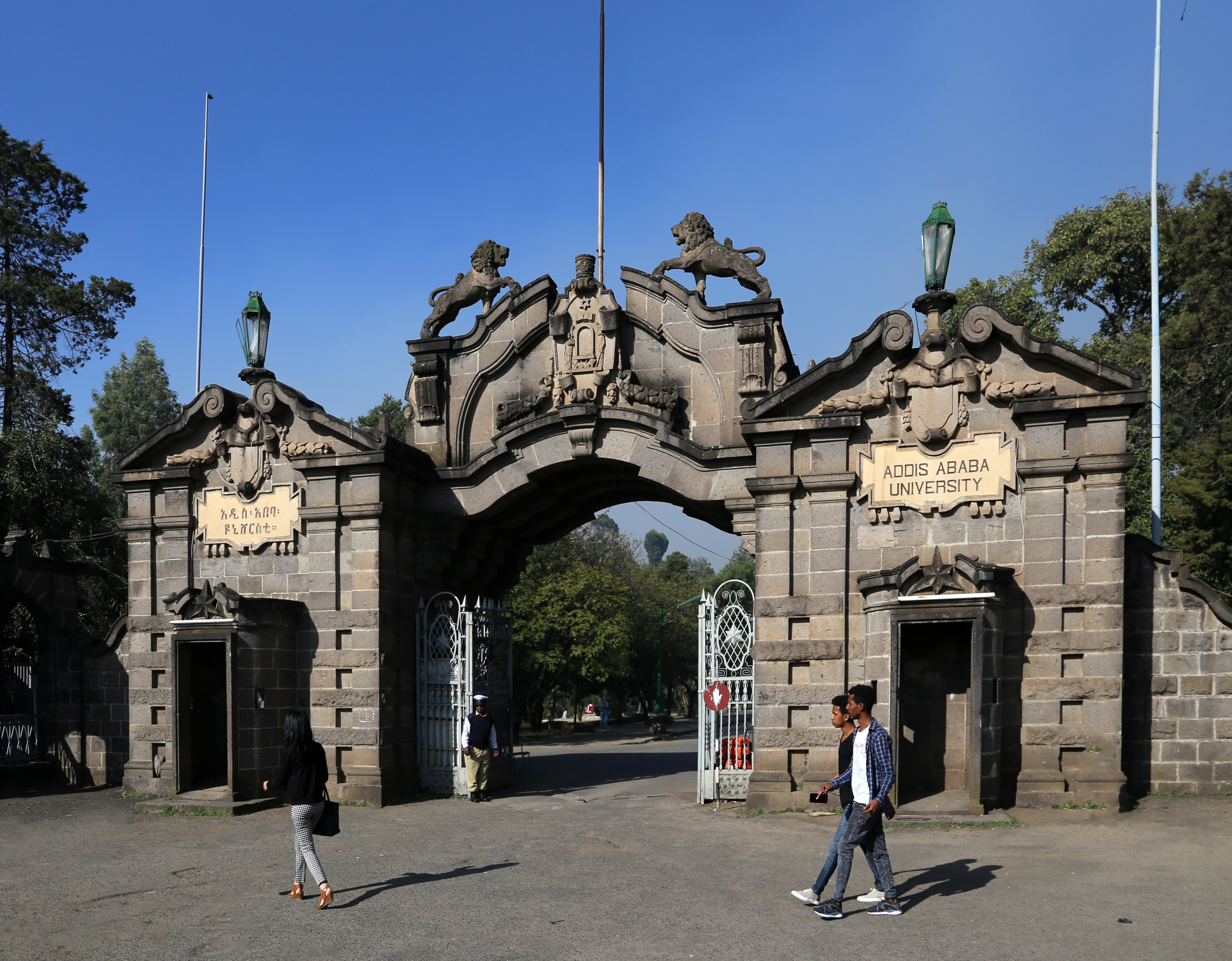
The entrance to Addis Ababa University in Addis Ababa, Ethiopia

The Ethiopian Orthodox Tewahedo Church doctrine embraces traditional higher institutions in Ethiopia. Modern higher education could be traced back to the regime of Emperor Haile Selassie, with the first university, the University College of Addis Ababa (now called the Addis Ababa University or AAU), formed in 1950. In 1954, the Haramaya University opened.

As of 2022, there are 83 private universities, 42 public universities, and more than 35 institutions of higher learning.

=== Ghana ===
There were a few private universities in Ghana before the beginning of the 21st century. However, since then, Ghana has seen a surge in the establishment of private universities and colleges – a reflection of the country's stable governance and the pace of economic growth. Most of these universities are not known to be sponsored by foreign corporate organizations or government universities, and the aim is to avoid the Ghanaian government's excessive payment of bonds, which is a requirement for all foreign institutions endeavoring to operate businesses in the country. Almost all the private universities in Ghana focus on similar areas of academic study, including business administration, human resources, accounting, information technology, and related fields, which are offered by universities like Ashesi, Regent, Valley View, Ghana Telecom, and others. In addition, the recent discovery of oil and gas in commercial quantities has influenced the development of oil and gas management courses within the private universities' curricula.

=== Kenya ===
The Commission for Higher Education in Kenya is the institution responsible for acknowledging universities as private. There are currently 33 private universities in Kenya.

=== Libya ===
Libya has several recognized private education institutions and universities that the Ministry of Higher Education has approved. They are ranked and qualified to specialize in academic programs in Business Administration, Computer Science, Law, Medicine, and Humanitarianism.

=== Nigeria ===
The National Universities Commission of Nigeria holds the responsibility to approve private universities and accredit their courses. This ensures a minimum standard in curriculum and teaching. There are currently 60 approved private universities in Nigeria, and many applications are being processed.

=== South Africa ===
In South Africa, only public institutions can be classified as a 'university'; and there are many distinctions between public schools and what are officially termed private higher education institutions. Recognised private higher education institutions include Akademia (af), Regent Business School, Eduvos, Varsity College, Vega School, Milpark Education, Midrand Graduate Institute, and Regenesys Business School.

== Asia and Middle East ==
=== Bangladesh ===
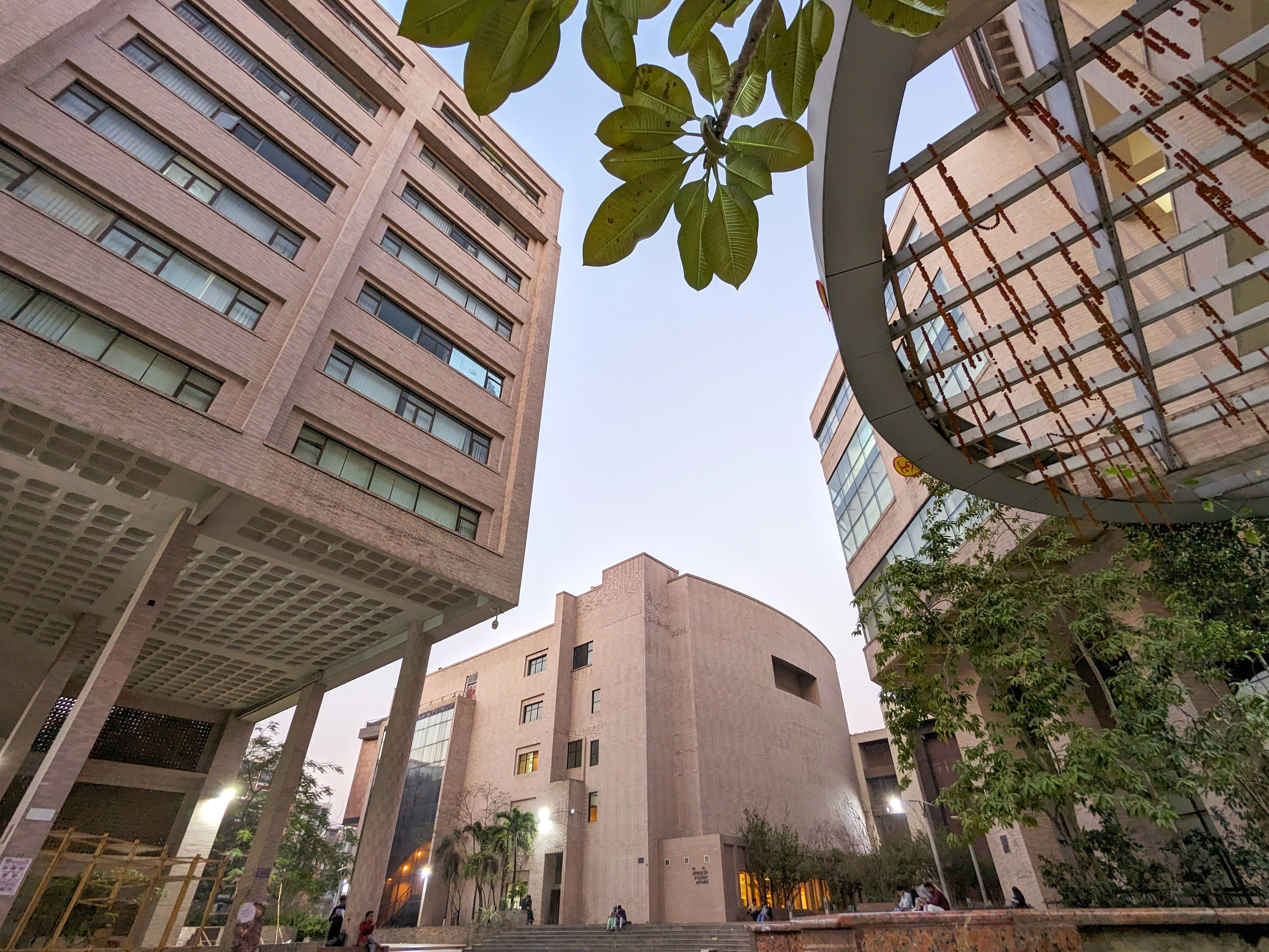
North South University in Dhaka, Bangladesh

Numerous private universities have been established in Bangladesh since the enactment of the Private University Act, 1992, which was later repealed and replaced by the Private University Act, 2010. The 2010 Act introduced a structured regulatory framework for private higher education, requiring each institution to establish a board of trustees, syndicate, and academic co5uncil. It also mandates that a university may receive provisional approval for up to seven years, after which permanent certification is granted if the university meets the prescribed academic and infrastructural standards.

All private universities must obtain approval from the University Grants Commission (UGC) before commencing operations, and their programmes and curricula are subject to UGC oversight. As of April 2025, there are 109 approved private universities operating across Bangladesh.

=== Brunei ===
Private institutions must confer the students with external programs such as BDTVEC, the largest awarding body in the country, BTEC, and Cambridge International Examinations pathways. Accreditation by the Brunei Darussalam National Accreditation Council (BDNAC) is crucial to establish a private institution.

=== Cambodia ===
Private universities have been established in Cambodia since 1997.

=== China ===
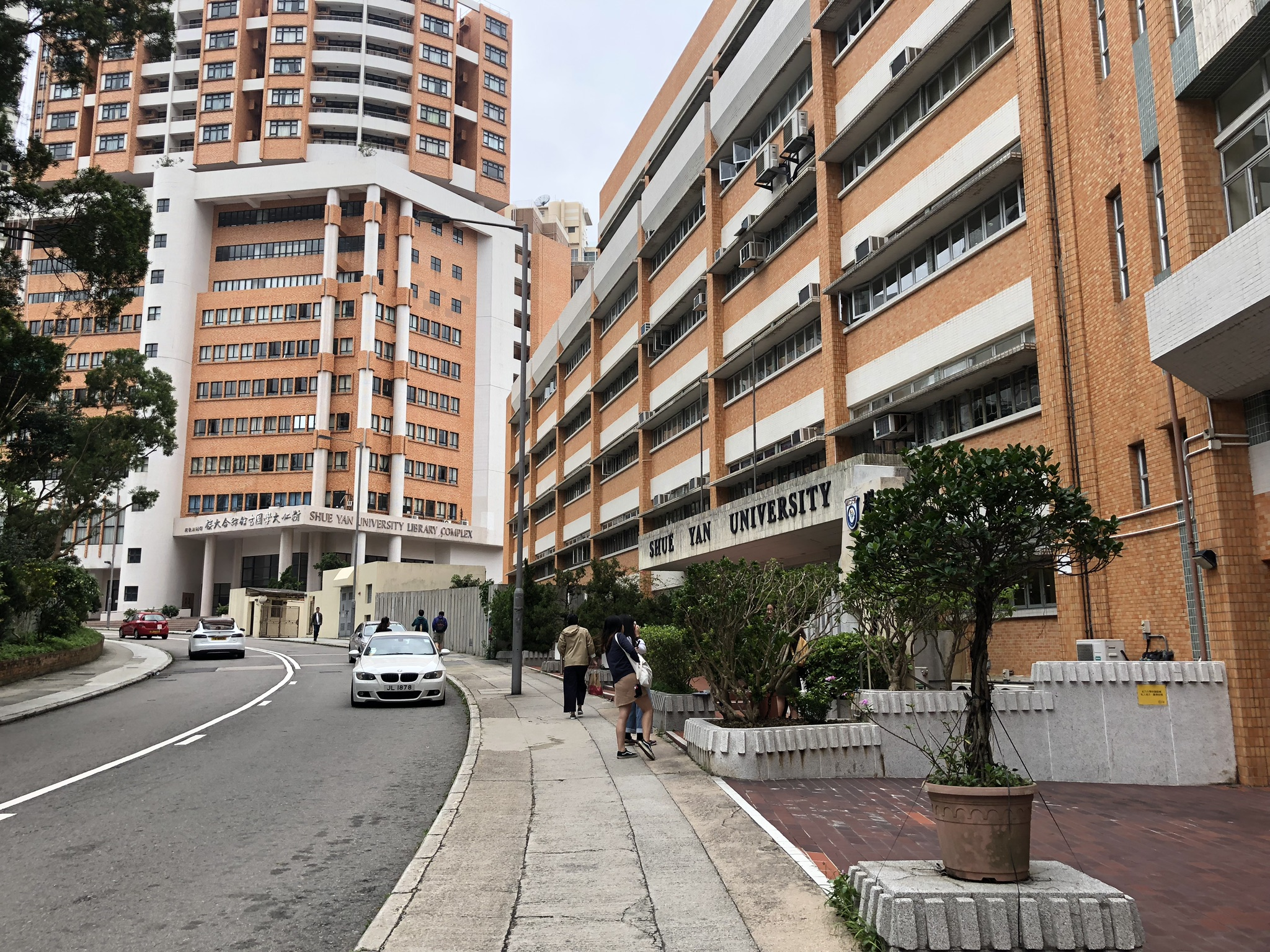
Hong Kong Shue Yan University in Hong Kong

Since 2003, joint-partnership private universities have been established in the People's Republic of China (PRC). Typically, the partners may include a Chinese university and a non-Chinese institution. English is often the only language of instruction at such universities and many focus on providing a comprehensive liberal arts education modeled after research universities in the United States and Europe.

=== India ===
Universities in India are recognized by the University Grants Commission (UGC), which draws its power from the University Grants Commission Act, 1956. Private universities in India are regulated under the UGC (Establishment and Maintenance of Standards in Private Universities) Regulations, 2003. Per the UGC act and these regulations, private (state) universities are established by acts of state legislative assemblies and listed by the UGC in the Gazette upon receiving the relevant act. As confirmed by the ruling of the Supreme Court of India, recognition by the UGC is required for the university to operate. Also, per the 2003 regulations, the UGC sends committees to inspect the state private universities and publishes their inspection report.

The UGC publishes and regularly updates the lists of state private universities. As of 17 January 2024, the UGC lists 471 state private universities.

=== Japan ===
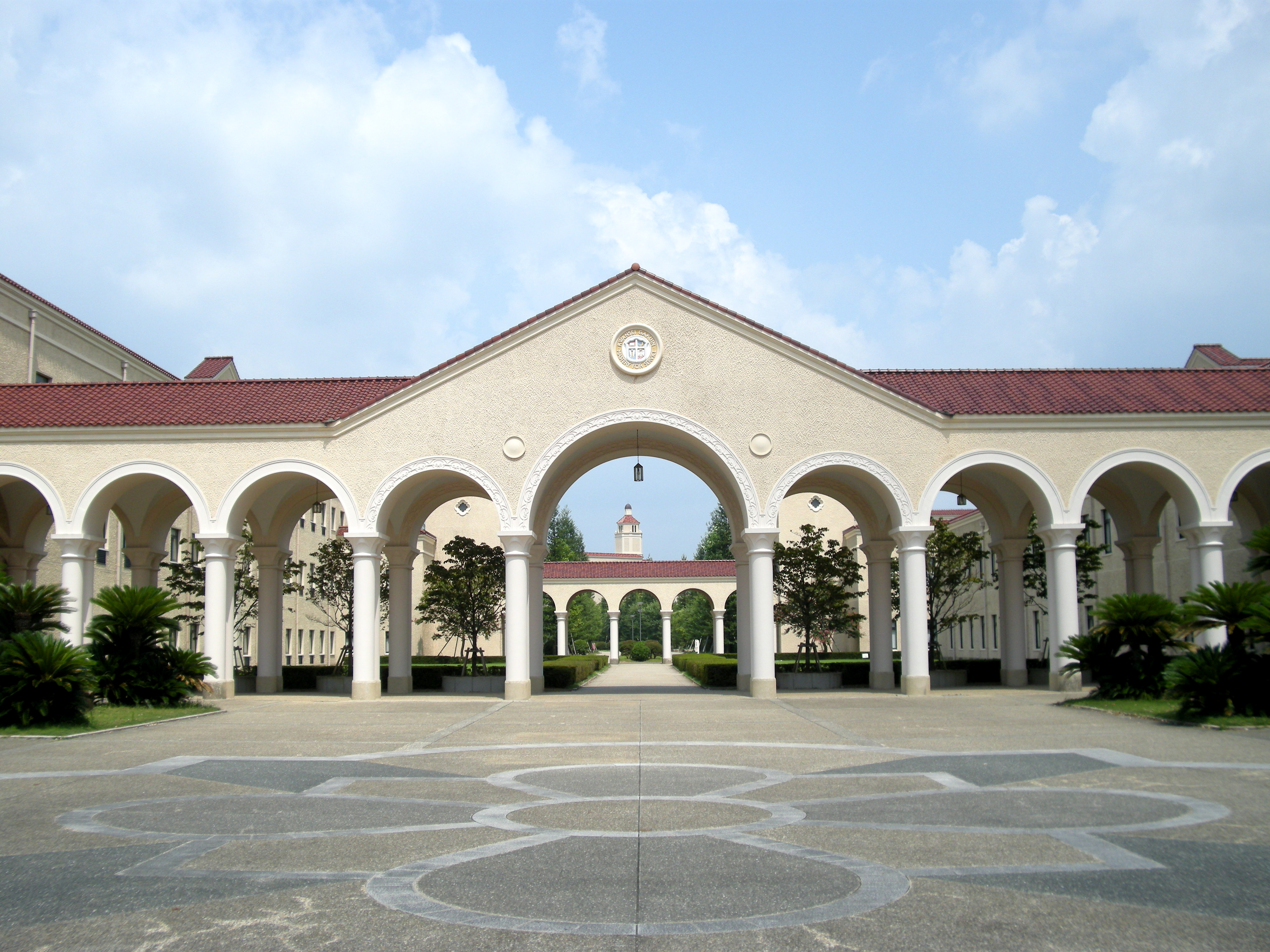
Kwansei Gakuin University in Nishinomiya, Japan

As of 2010, Japan had 597 private universities, 86 national universities, and 95 public universities. Private universities thus account for over 75% of all universities in Japan. A large number of junior colleges in Japan are private and like public and national universities, many private universities use National Center Test for University Admissions as an entrance exam.

=== Jordan ===
There is one private university in Madaba city, the American University of Madaba (AUM).

=== Kuwait ===
There are 11 private universities and colleges in Kuwait.

=== Lebanon ===
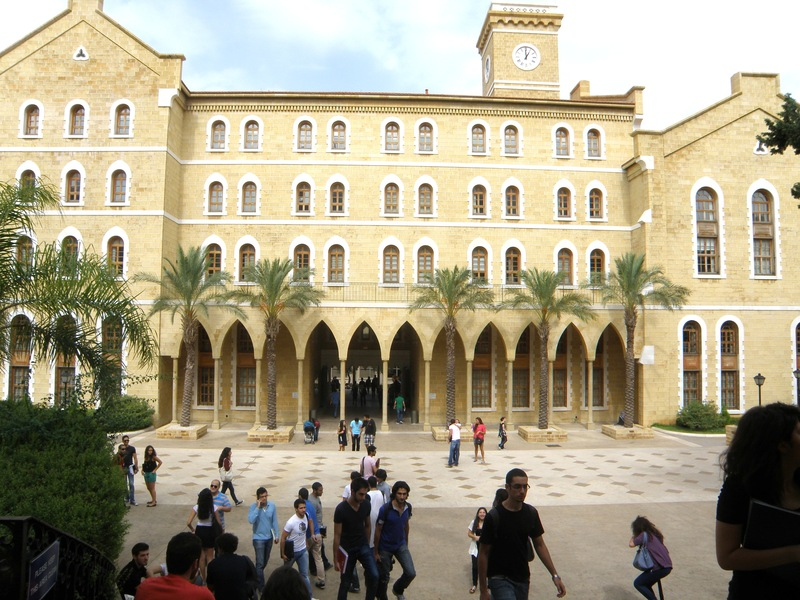
American University of Beirut in Beirut, Lebanon

There are 19 private universities in Lebanon. Among these, the American University of Beirut and the Lebanese American University are internationally acknowledged.

The languages used for teaching in private universities are mainly French and English; Arabic is widely used in religious universities and Armenian is used in the Armenian university.

The first university opened in Lebanon was the Syrian Protestant College in 1866 (which became the American University of Beirut in 1921). It was founded by Daniel Bliss, a Protestant missionary. The second university opened in Lebanon was the Université Saint-Joseph, founded by the Jesuits in 1875.

=== Oman ===
Oman is home to several private universities, including Sohar University, the University of Nizwa, Middle East College, and the German University of Technology in Oman. These universities offer a range of undergraduate, graduate, and professional programs in fields such as business, engineering, and information technology. Private universities in Oman offer a more personalized and interactive learning experience, as the student-teacher ratio is typically lower and there are more opportunities for hands-on learning. Additionally, private universities in Oman often have more flexible curricula and can respond quickly to changing labor markets and global trends.

All private universities in Oman must be recognized by the Omani Ministry of Higher Education to offer degree programs and receive approval for new degrees. The Ministry has procedures and standards that all universities must meet to receive accreditation and recognition as an institution of higher education.

=== Pakistan ===
The Higher Education Commission (HEC), formerly the University Grant Commission (UGC), is the primary regulator of higher education in Pakistan. It also facilitates the development of the higher educational system in Pakistan. Its main purpose is to upgrade the schools to be world-class centers of education, research, and development. It also plays a leading role in building a knowledge-based economy in Pakistan by giving out hundreds of doctoral scholarships for education abroad every year.

Despite the criticism of the HEC, its creation had a positive impact on higher education in Pakistan. Its two-year report for 2004 to 2006 states that according to the Institute of Scientific Information, the total number of publications appearing in the 8,000 leading journals indexed in the Web of Science arising out of Pakistan in 2005 was 1,259 articles, representing a 41% increase over the past two years and a 60% increase since the establishment of HEC in 2002. The HEC digital library now provides access to over 20,000 leading research journals, covering about 75% of the world's peer-reviewed scientific journals.

Until 1991, there were only two recognized private universities in Pakistan: Aga Khan University, established in 1983, and Lahore University of Management Sciences, established in 1985. By 1997, there were 10 private universities. From 2001 to 2002, this number had doubled to 20. Among the first to gain degree awarding status was Hajvery University, Lahore (HU), established in 1990. From 2003 to 2004, Pakistan had a total of 83 private degree-granting institutions.

=== Saudi Arabia ===
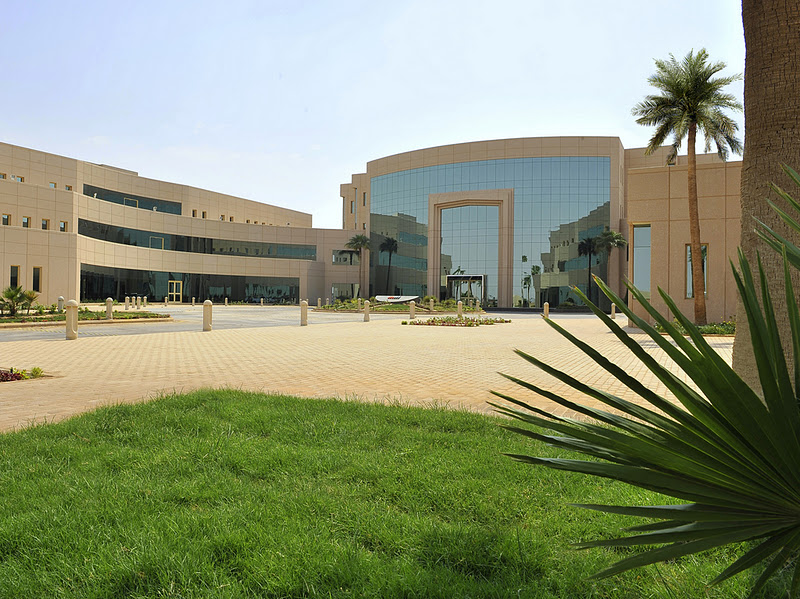
Al Yamamah University in Riyadh, Saudi Arabia

There are nine private universities in Saudi Arabia.

=== Sri Lanka ===
In Sri Lanka, state-recognized private institutes are allowed to award degrees under Section 25A of the Universities Act No. 16 of 1978. The University Grants Commission is responsible for the accreditation of these institutes and degrees. These mostly provide undergraduate degrees with a few providing postgraduate degrees. Informatics Institute of Technology (IIT), NSBM Green University, Horizon Campus, Sri Lanka Institute of Information Technology (SLIIT) and SLTC Research University are examples. Some foreign universities franchise parts of their degree courses in Sri Lanka with local institutes. Students are charged for the study (some of these institutes are state-funded institutions of their home countries) and these charges are often a fraction of the cost of studying in the home countries of these institutions.

Efforts to establish private universities have been blocked due to protests from state universities' undergraduates and leftist political parties.

Many private colleges have sprung up since, including the Auston Institute of Management, Singapore. The Sri Lanka campus was established in 2010 and is a Board of Investment or (BOI) company. It retains a similar focus to the home campus and occupies a prime spot along Colombo's famous Galle Road.

=== Taiwan ===
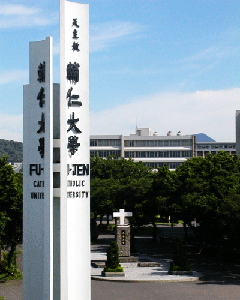
Fu Jen Catholic University in New Taipei City

In Taiwan, private universities are typically not as prestigious as some public (national) universities. They are not ranked as high as public institutions and cost nearly twice as much. This is due to the form of testing in schools in Taiwan, in which students take a national entrance exam to determine their university qualifications. The most well known private university is Fu Jen Catholic University, and the oldest is Tunghai University.

=== Vietnam ===
Since the 1990s, several private universities have opened in Vietnam including Ho Chi Minh City Open University being one of the first. Some characteristics of Vietnamese private universities as of 2010 are high (very high in some cases) tuition fees, poor infrastructure, limited faculty, and human resources.

Private universities are often named after scholars (Fulbright University Vietnam, Vo Truong Toan University, Nguyen Trai University, Luong The Vinh University, Chu Van An University, Yersin University, Phan Chau Trinh University), or heroes/legends (Hung Vuong University, Quang Trung University); although there are exceptions such as FPT University, named after the FPT Corporation and Tan Tao University in Tan Tao Group.

In Vietnam, there are also "semi-private university"; schools in this category which can receive partial financial support from the government. Almost all private universities have to invite professors and lecturers from state universities. Many lecturers from state-owned universities take up positions in private universities after their retirement.

== Europe ==
=== Armenia ===
There are numerous private universities and independent faculties in Armenia, mostly in Yerevan. As of 2022, there are 31 private higher education institutions in the country, most notably the American University of Armenia and the Eurasia International University.

=== Austria ===
In Austria, educational institutions must be authorized by the country to legally grant academic degrees. All state-run universities are governed by the 2002 Austrian Universities' and University Degree Programmes' Organisation Act (Federal Law Gazette No. 120/2002). In 1999, a federal law (Universitäts-Akkreditierungsgesetz) was passed to allow the accreditation of private universities. The Akkreditierungsrat (Accreditation Council) evaluates applicants and issues recommendations to the responsible Austrian accreditation authority (the Austrian Federal Ministry of Science & Research).

Accreditation by the council yields a couple of privileges: degrees issued by accredited private universities have the same legal status as those issued by state-run universities. Private universities can appoint or promote professors. Their students enjoy the same privileges including social security, foreign law, and state scholarships as students at state universities. Educational services of private universities are not subject to value added tax, and donations are tax-deductible.

Accreditations must be renewed regularly and can be withdrawn, e.g., in the case of repeated academic misconduct as happened in 2003 when the accreditation of International University Vienna was withdrawn. In 2006, when the accreditation of Imadec University expired, the Accreditation Council rejected any renewal requests.

Austrian law provides that private universities in Austria must use the term Privatuniversität ("private university") in their German names, although their formal names in other languages are not regulated. Thus, there is the possibility of private institutions employing the term "university" as opposed to "private university" in their advertisements in all languages except German while still complying with Austrian law.

While the legal definition of "private university" prohibits funding by the federal government of Austria, funding by other public bodies is not prohibited. Consequently, some of Austria's private universities are partly or wholly funded by provincial governments, while others are fully privately funded.

Accreditation of private universities began in 2001. As of 2020, Austria has 16 private universities. Most are small (fewer than 1000 students) and specialize in only one or two fields of study. Four former private universities are not accredited anymore: the International University Vienna, whose accreditation was withdrawn in 2003 due to academic misconduct; Imadec University, whose first accreditation period ended in January 2006 and was not renewed; TCM Privatuniversität Li Shi Zhen in Vienna, whose accreditation period ended 2009 without renewal students; and PEF Private University of Management Vienna, which closed for economic reasons in March 2012.

=== Belgium ===
Belgium makes a distinction between free institutions (as in free from the State), which are recognized and funded by the Communities of Belgium (the State until 1990) and follow the same rules and laws as fully public universities, and fully private institutions, which are not recognized nor funded by the authorities, and thus do not issue valid degrees.

Private (free) institutions are predominantly Catholic: UCLouvain, KU Leuven or Saint-Louis University, Brussels. On the contrary, the Free University of Brussels (nowadays split into ULB and VUB) was founded by masonic individuals. All of these institutions began to be recognized by the State from 1891 onwards.

It is forbidden by law to call a fully private institution "university" or "faculty", meaning fully private (non-free) 'universities' have limited visibility.

=== Bulgaria ===
Bulgaria has many private universities, among which the most renowned are New Bulgarian University, located in the capital city Sofia; Burgas Free University; Varna Free University and American University in Bulgaria.

=== Finland ===
Finland does not officially recognize private universities but does not explicitly forbid them either. Helsinki School of Business is an example of one such educational institution operating in this market.

=== France ===
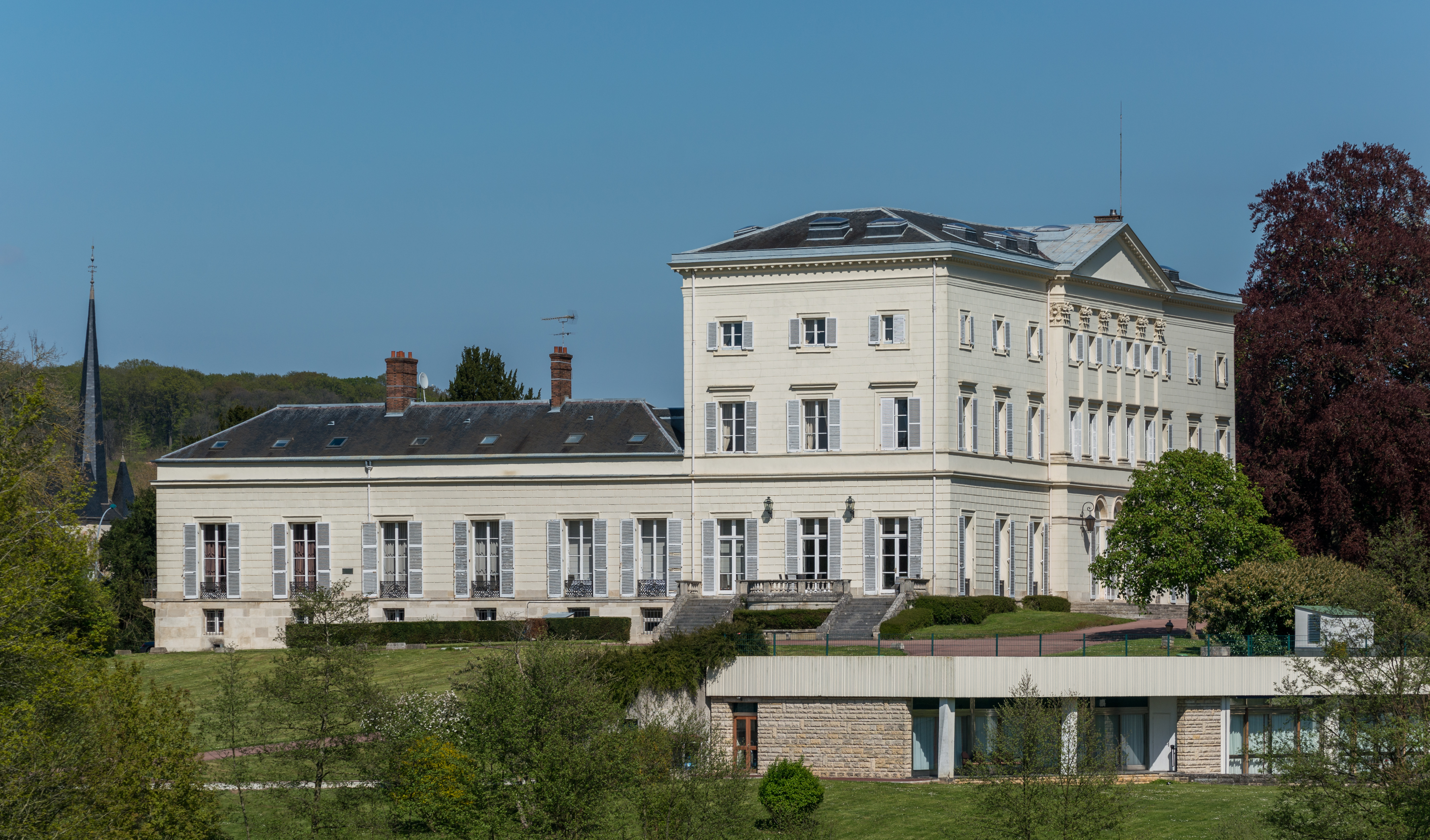
HEC, in Jouy-en-Josas, near Paris

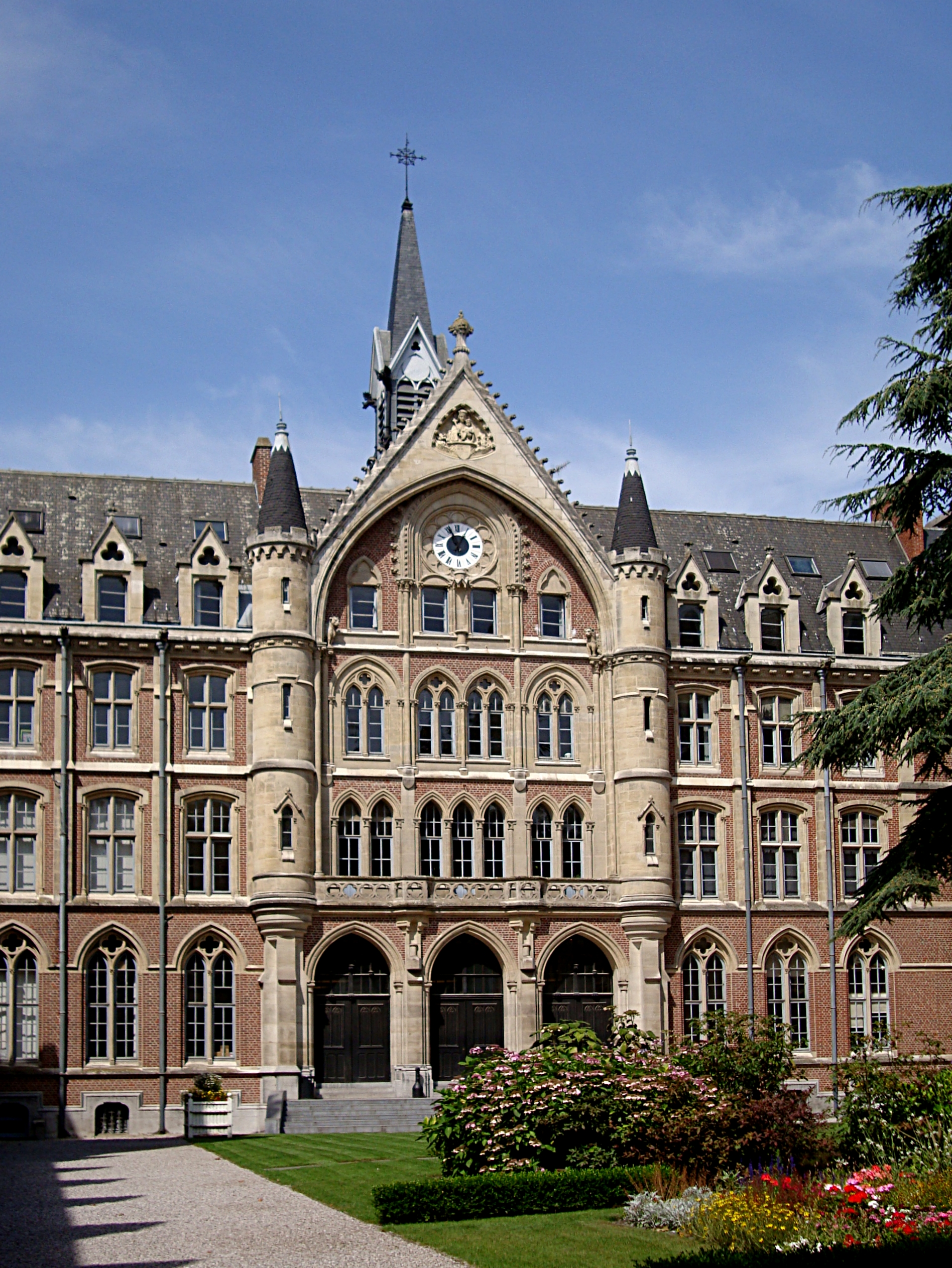
Université catholique de Lille in Lille has a dual system with universities and grandes écoles.

Since 1880, it has been illegal for a private institution to be called "université", and most of the universities in France are public.

In France, grandes écoles are part of an alternative educational system that operates alongside the mainstream French public university system. Grandes écoles can be public, semi-private or private, but the most prestigious ones are public. These institutions operate mostly in engineering studies and business administration. The best-known semi-private grandes écoles are generally business, engineering, and humanities schools; they are generally managed by chambers of commerce and industry, with capital open to other private companies. Other grandes écoles are entirely private, but this is rarer, and they sometimes establish partnerships with public universities.

Universities and grandes écoles compete in these two fields. Some of them report to the Ministry of Higher Education, such as Arts et Métiers ParisTech and École Centrale Paris, and a few to the Ministry of Defense, such as École polytechnique. Several private grandes écoles are members of the Conférence des Grandes Écoles, a lobbying group representing grandes écoles. Most grandes écoles can be joined after following two years of classe préparatoire aux grandes écoles, an intensive program following the baccalauréat. A selective examination after the two additional years is taken to enter a grande école. Following the Bologna Process, this full 5-year course (two years of preparatory classes plus 3 years in engineering or business school) is equivalent to a master's degree.

For their engineering programs, the grandes écoles award an "Diplôme d'Ingénieur", similar to a Master of Engineering degree. This engineer's degree, required to use the engineer title in France, is strictly protected and can only be awarded by state-accredited grandes écoles, via the Engineering Accreditation Commission.

Business schools that are grandes écoles (like HEC or ESCP) offer a "Programme Grande École" or "PGE" (generally translated into English as "Master in Management", or "MiM"), which delivers a state-accredited diploma that is considerably more prestigious than a French master's degree in management delivered by university schools of management (IAE) or faculties in the mainstream French university system. Grandes écoles for studying business administration are usually part of the chambers of commerce. For example, HEC is part of the Paris Chamber of Commerce and is therefore semi-private.

Some older private institutions were created in 1875, under the regime of the Free Higher Education Act of 1875. These institutions have been called Catholic universities since 1880, or formally the "Catholic Institutes". There are five of these: the Catholic universities of Lille, Lyon, Paris, Toulouse, and the West.

These institutions provide courses in all academic fields (engineering, law, medical, economics, arts, business administration, sociology). One may join a university after a high school degree and study there for a licence (bachelor's), master's degree, or doctoral program. By law, private institutions may grant states degrees after agreeing a contract with public universities.

=== Germany ===
As of 2024, Germany has 110 private universities (called Privathochschule) and 38 church-run universities (called kirchliche Hochschule). Similar to the state-run universities, they are subdivided into Universitäten (research universities), Fachhochschulen (universities of applied science) and Kunst- und Musikhochschulen (art schools). Private universities in Germany need institutional accreditation by the state.

The first private university in Germany, the Fresenius University of Applied Sciences, was established in 1848. EBS University of Business and Law opened in 1971. Some institutions, such as Lancaster University Leipzig, operate as private branch campuses of universities headquartered outside the country.

Though private universities are numerous in Germany, they represent only less than 1% of all students. Some private universities, including Hanseatic University Rostock (2007–2009) and the International University in Germany in Bruchsal, have gone out of business. As of 2026, universities such as WHU, Frankfurt School of Finance & Management and Constructor are ranked as top private universities.

Most of the church universities are run by the Protestant or Catholic churches; however, there is one Jewish university (Hochschule für Jüdische Studien) in Heidelberg.

=== Greece ===
In Greece, private universities are prohibited by the constitution (Article 16). However, laboratories of liberal studies (Εργαστήρια ελευθέρων σπουδών, ergastiria eleftheron spoudon) operate freely in the country and based on a law from the 1930s, they are registered as private for-profit businesses and regulated by the Greek Ministry of Commerce. Their academic degrees, which are not recognised in Greece, are directly provided to students by foreign universities in the United Kingdom, United States of America, or other countries, usually through franchise or validation agreements (the franchise agreement usually being considered better). This has limited access to the laboratories, which usually teach in English, to high-income Greeks who for various reasons (usually family matters) did not want to go abroad.

In 2008, a law was introduced that forced all private institutions collaborating with foreign universities to offer programmes in the country, to register with the Greek Ministry of Education and Religious Affairs as colleges (κολλέγια, kollegia) by August 2009. Further amendments to the framework in 2010, 2012, and 2013 (4111/2013, 4093/2012) were introduced. Today there are a series of private colleges in Greece mostly in Athens and Thessaloniki.

=== Ireland ===
In the Republic of Ireland, a private university (more commonly known as a private college) is a university that is not funded by the state, and therefore not covered by the free-fees initiative. All universities, institutes of technology, colleges of education, and the National College of Ireland and some religious institutions are publicly funded and therefore covered by free-fees initiative. There are a few private colleges that are highly specialized such as Griffith College Dublin, Dorset College and Dublin Business School. The Higher Education Colleges Association is a representative body for private colleges in Ireland. Private colleges in Ireland can seek to have their programmes validated/accredited by the Higher Education and Training Awards Council.

=== Netherlands ===
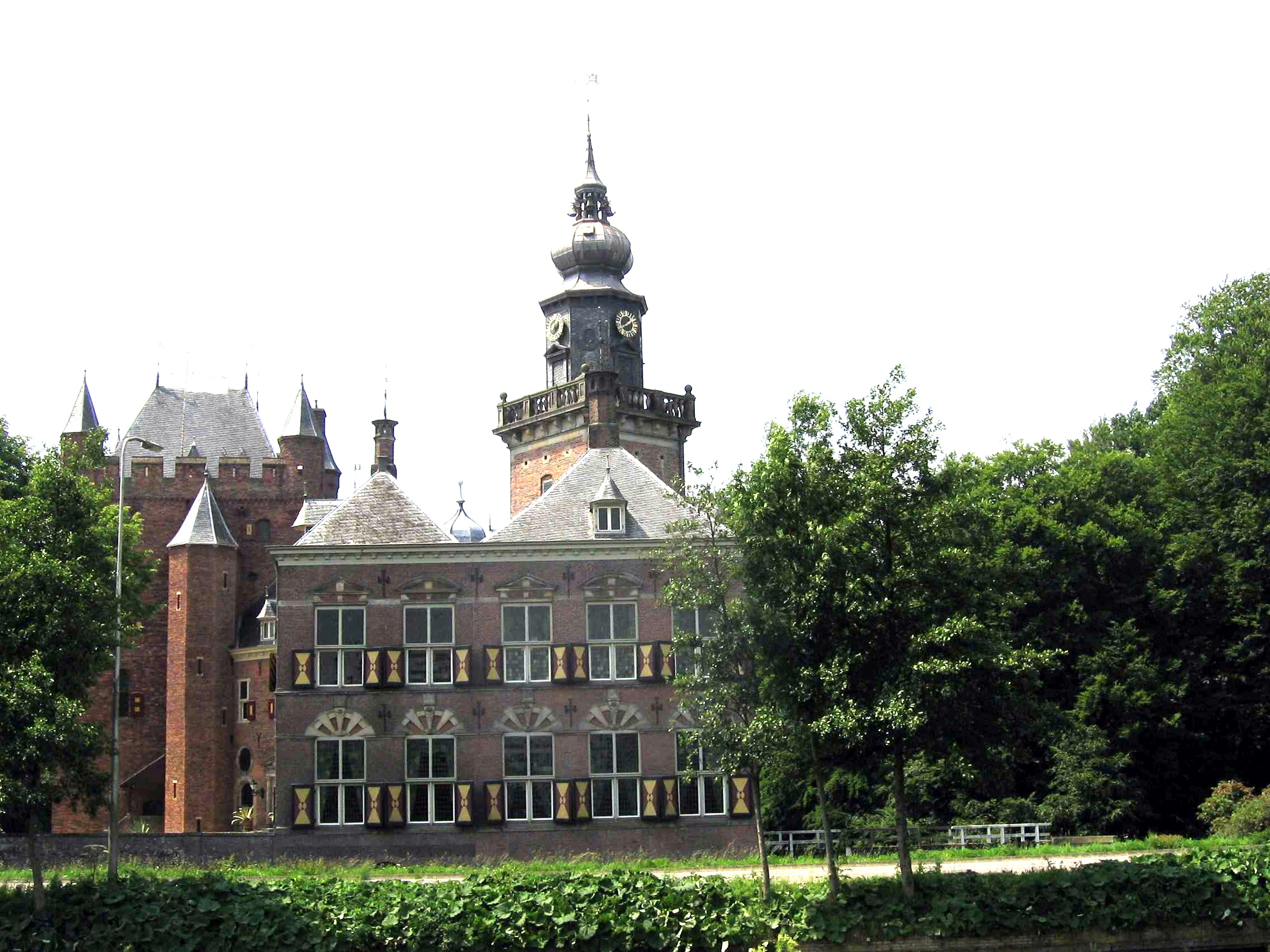
Nyenrode Business University in Breukelen

Nyenrode Business University is the only private university in the Netherlands at the graduate level. The university was founded in 1946. It serves as a graduate school for business and management. Both programs are taught in English. Recently, Nyenrode merged with the Institute for CPA Education and both institutions share their facilities. The Nyenrode Business University also contains a campus and an active student body.

Other Dutch private universities are universities of applied sciences where one can obtain a bachelor's or master's degree but not a PhD. These include Wittenborg University, Business School Notenboom (founded in 1958) and IVA Driebergen for the automotive industry with its earliest beginnings in 1930.

=== Poland ===
There are 321 accredited private colleges in Poland. They award bachelor's degrees, master's degrees and doctorate degrees.

=== Portugal ===
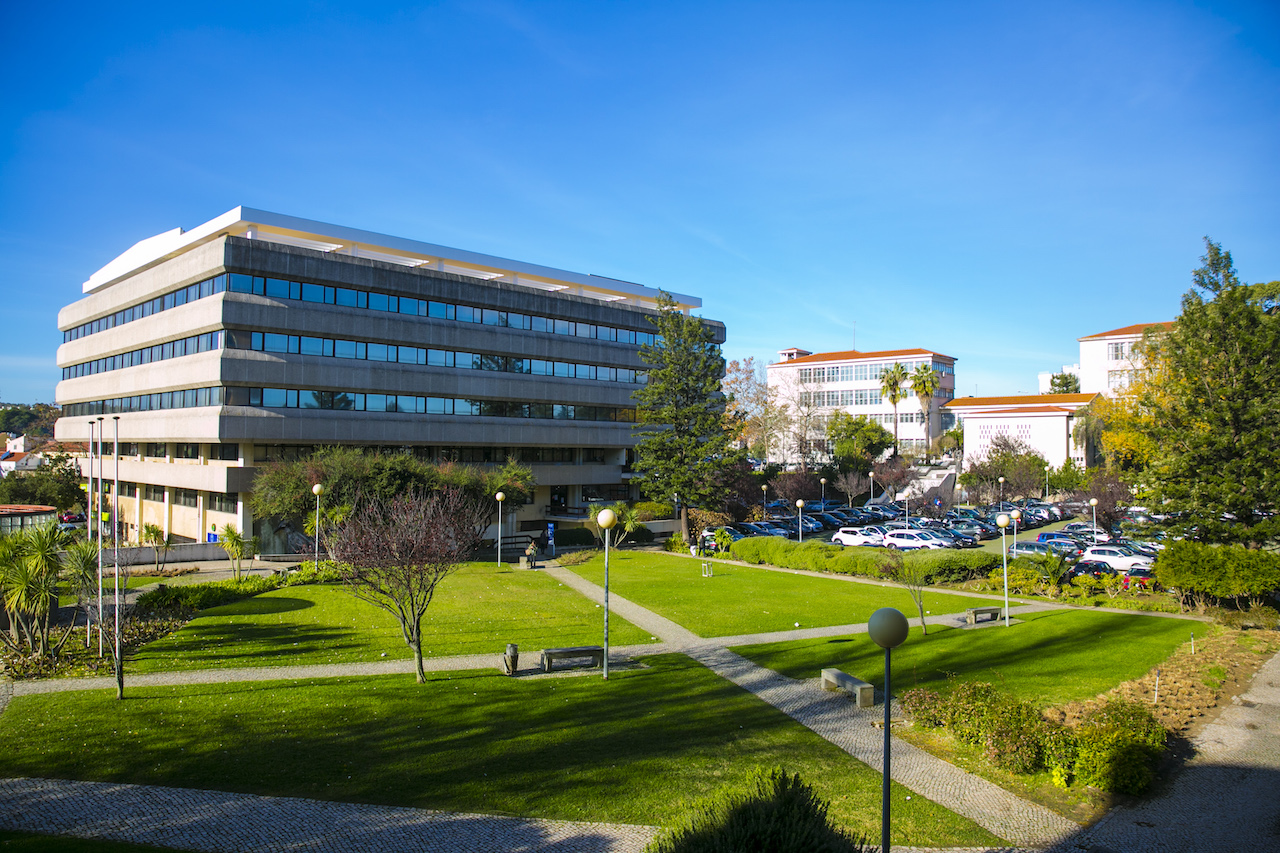
Catholic University of Portugal, a private university in Lisbon

The oldest non-state-run university was the Universidade Católica Portuguesa – UCP (Catholic University of Portugal), a Catholic private university (concordatory status) that was the first to be founded in 1967 and was officially recognized in 1971. UCP offers some well-recognized degrees and is reputed for the economics, law and business management degrees it awards at its Lisbon branch.

After the Carnation Revolution of 1974, in the 1980s and 1990s, a boom of educational private institutions was experienced in Portugal, and many private universities started to open. Most had a poor reputation and were known for making it easy for students to enter and also to get high grades. In 2007, several of those private universities, or their heirs, were investigated and faced compulsory closing (for example, the infamous Independente University and Internacional University closings along with the Moderna University scandal) or official criticism with recommendations that the state-managed investigation proposed for improving their quality and avoid termination.

In the mid-2000s, within the Bologna process, a reorganization of higher education was started which included more stringent regulations for private education and expanded state policies with regard to private education quality assurance and educational accreditation. In general, private higher education institutions were often considered to be the last resort for underachieving applicants who did not score enough points in the admission examinations to enter the main public institutions.

Nearly open-admission policies have hurt private universities' reputation and the actual quality of their alumni. Without large endowments like those received in universities of other countries – like the U.S. for many of its private universities and colleges that are attractive to the best scholars, researchers, and students – the private higher education institutions of Portugal, with a few exceptions, do not have either the financial support or the academic profile to reach the highest teaching and research standards of the top Portuguese public universities. In addition, most private universities have faced a restrictive lack of collaboration with the major enterprises which, have developed fruitful relationships with many public higher education institutions. Most Portuguese private universities specialise in a limited number of fields, most often in the social sciences and humanities.

=== Serbia ===
There are several private universities and independent faculties in Serbia, mostly in Belgrade. They were founded in the 1990s and 2000s.

=== Spain ===
The expansion of private universities in Spain began mainly in the early 1990s, following legislative changes that allowed the creation of new non-public institutions. Since then, the number of private universities has grown steadily, particularly in large metropolitan areas.

The first private university in Spain is generally considered to be the University of Deusto, founded in 1886 in Bilbao by the Society of Jesus (Jesuits). Other well-known examples include Comillas Pontifical University (Madrid), University of Navarra (Pamplona), ESADE (Barcelona), EU Business School (Barcelona), and IE University (Madrid).

=== Switzerland ===
In addition to the public Universities in Switzerland, Switzerland has several private universities.

=== Turkey ===
In Turkey, private universities are required by the Higher Education Law (Article 3/c and Annexed Article 2) to be established and operated by foundations, which are non-profit private legal entities. These institutions possess public legal personality under the same law and are classified as foundation universities (Turkish: vakıf üniversitesi) in the relevant regulations. As a result, they are commonly referred to as foundation universities rather than private universities. As of 2025, 75 foundation universities are in operation, with Bilkent University, established in 1984, being the first.

=== United Kingdom ===
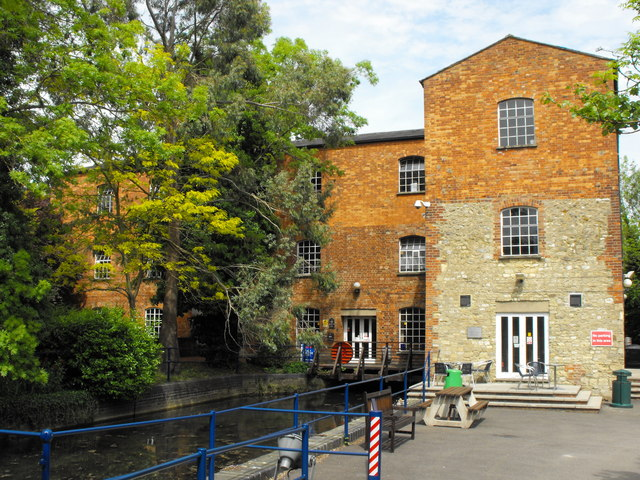
University of Buckingham, a private university in Buckingham, United Kingdom

There are four fully private universities in the United Kingdom: the non-profit University of Buckingham, Regent's University London and Richmond American University London, and the for-profit BPP University.

All other British universities are partly publicly funded and regulated. The government regulates tuition fees, student funding, and student loans, whilst also commissioning and regulating research assessments and teaching reviews.

However, unlike in Continental European countries, the British government does not own universities' assets, and university staff are not civil servants: the status as a public body arises from accepting funding from bodies such as the Office for Students (OfS) in England; any university can, in principle, choose to leave the publicly funded sector and the associated fee cap (although they would remain subject to OfS regulation, which applies to all higher education providers in England). Since September 2012 government funding for teaching and background funding for research has been substantially reduced, with one study from that year indicating that annual government funding for teaching and research would make up just 15% of universities' income by 2015.

In the UK, an institution can only use the title of "University" or "University College" if it has been granted by the Privy Council or (in England) by the Office for Students, under the terms of the Further and Higher Education Act 1992 as amended by the Higher Education and Research Act 2017. Several private higher education colleges, which also hold degree awarding powers, exist in the United Kingdom. There are also a number of private foreign universities that have campuses located in the UK.

== North and Central America ==
=== Canada ===
Canada has several private universities that have been granted the power to award degrees by a provincial authority. However, the majority of degree-granting institutions in the country are public universities as a result of the Canadian university system and its historic reliance on government funds for support. The oldest private universities in Canada operated as seminaries or as religiously affiliated institutions, although several for-profit and not-for-profit private universities were opened in Canada during the late 20th and early 21st centuries.

=== Guatemala ===
In Guatemala, the only public university is Universidad de San Carlos de Guatemala. The rest of the degree-offering institutions in the country are private, see list of universities in Guatemala.

=== Mexico ===
Mexico has private and public (government-managed) universities. Public universities are either free or require a very minimum fee, whereas private universities usually charge for an initial enrollment and monthly fees.

=== United States ===
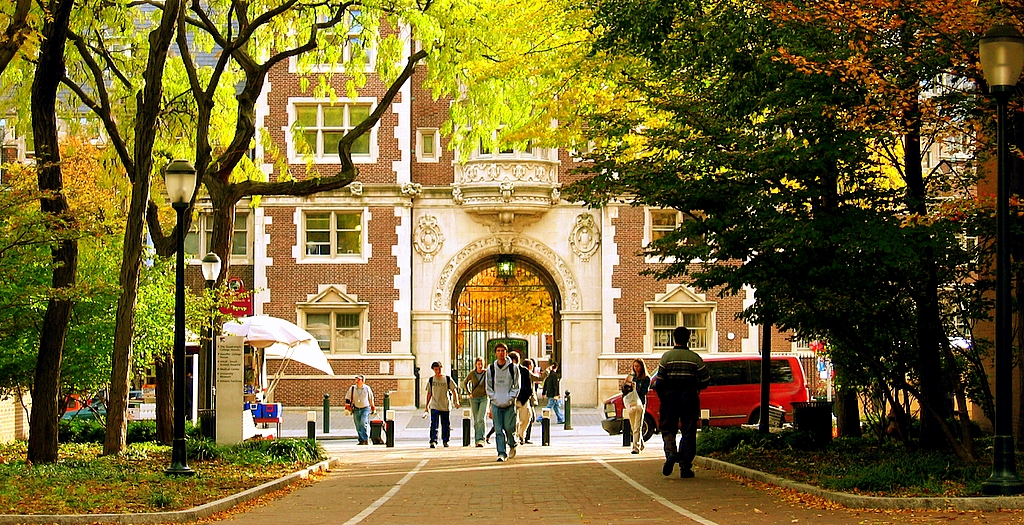
University of Pennsylvania in Philadelphia, an Ivy League university and one of the oldest private universities in the United States

Private colleges and universities are generally owned by either a nonprofit corporation or a for-profit corporation, and usually participate in higher education accreditation in the United States. The oldest universities, the nine colonial colleges were founded before the United States, with an initial focus on training men for (Protestant) Christian ministry. Seven of the nine remain private and two later became public and all developed into largely secular comprehensive universities, although several still retain their theology departments. Many private colleges and universities began with, and a good number still retain, a religious affiliation (primarily Christian). In contrast, public colleges and universities are all secular, given the separation of church and state.

Despite the large number of private schools in the U.S. only about 20% of American college students attend private colleges; the remainder primarily attend state-supported schools. Universities base their selections on academic performance as well as many secondary factors. In the US, 4,648 out of 6,606 post-secondary institutions (70%) were private as of 2016–17, of which 1,823 (39%) were non-profit and 2,825 (61%) were for-profit. Among degree-granting four-year institutions, 2,095 were private out of 2,832 (74%), of which 1,581 (75%) were non-profit and 514 (25%) were for-profit.

Tuition at private universities tends to be higher than at public universities, though many private universities offer financial aid as well. For example, at Washington University in St. Louis, 45% of students receive some form of financial support from either the university or the federal government, averaging $53,423.

== Oceania ==
=== Australia ===
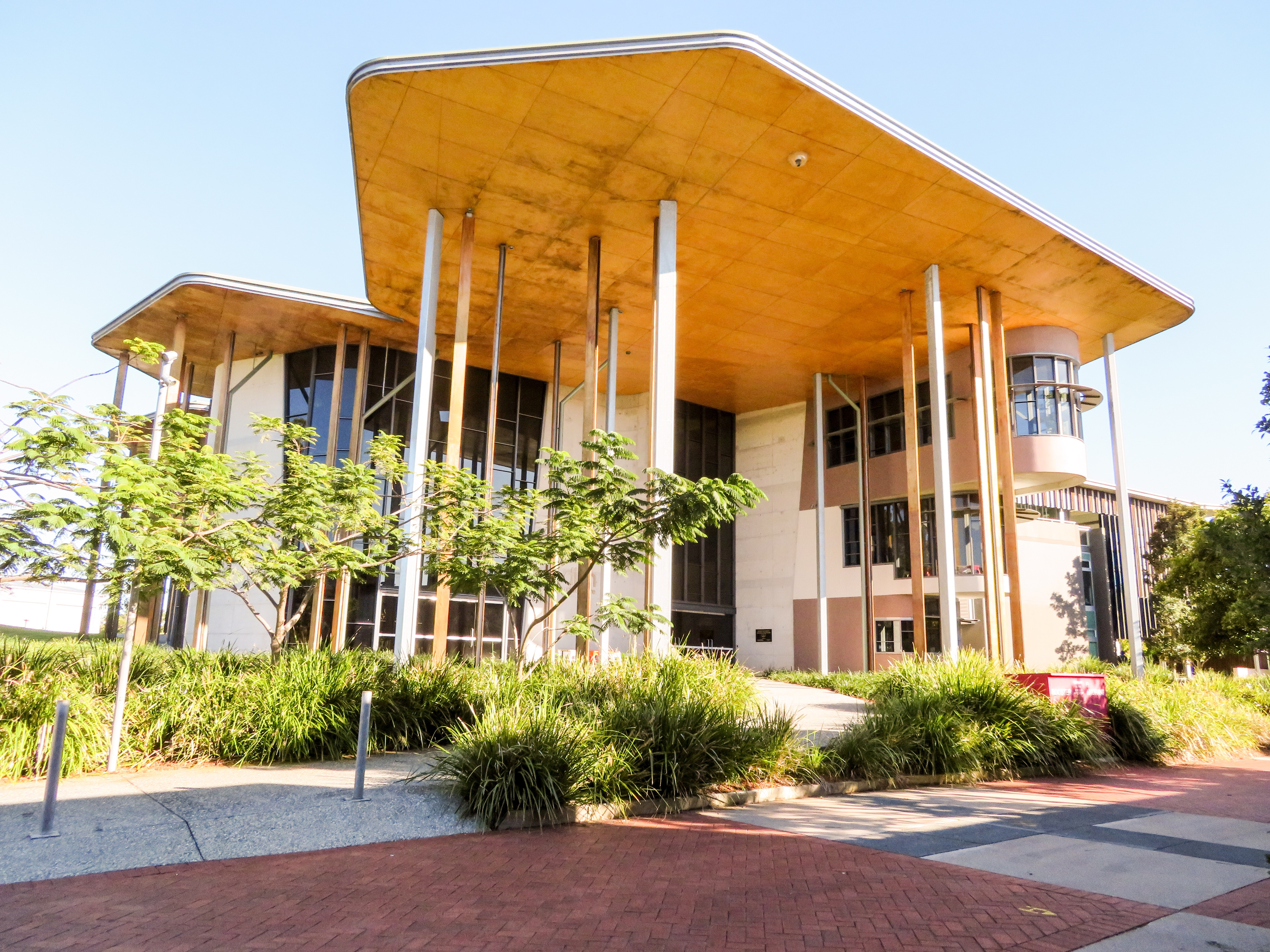
Bond University in Robina, Queensland

There are currently three private universities in Australia. Bond University was established as Australia's first private university in 1987. Situated on the Gold Coast, it runs three semesters per year (correlating exactly with the Northern and Southern Hemispheres' schedules), which allow students to complete a six-semester degree in two years, and an eight-semester degree (e.g., Law) in under three years. The University of Notre Dame Australia, a private Catholic university based in Fremantle, was established two years later in 1989, and the newest of the three, Torrens University Australia, opened in Adelaide in 2014.

== South America ==
=== Argentina ===
Even though Argentina has a robust network of free public universities it also has over thirty private universities accredited by the national Ministry of Education. All accredited private higher education institutions must be run by nonprofit organizations. Other for-profit institutions exist but cannot give out official degrees or call themselves universities.

=== Chile ===
Chile has 31 completely private universities and an additional 14 universities which are run by private organizations (mostly religious) but receive some state funding.
