= PEF =

PEF, PeF, or Pef may stand for the following abbreviations:

- Palestine Exploration Fund
- Peak expiratory flow
- PEF Private University of Management Vienna
- Pentax raw file (see Raw image format)
- Pentecostal European Fellowship
- Perpetual Education Fund
- Perpetual Emigration Fund
- Pinellas Education Foundation, a nonprofit organization based in Florida
- Polyethylene 2,5-furandicarboxylate, a bioplastic material
- Preferred Executable Format
- Primary energy factor
- Princeton Evangelical Fellowship, a Christian campus ministry at Princeton University
- Public Employees Federation, the New York state public employees union that is a member of AFL-CIO
- Punjab Education Foundation, a governmental education body in the Punjab, Pakistan

PEF may also refer to:

- the nickname of actor Pierre-François Martin-Laval
