= Hoàng Yến (disambiguation) =

Hoàng Yến (Hoàng Yến Chibi, born 1995) is a Vietnamese singer and actress.

Hoàng Yến may also refer to:

- Dang Thi Hoang Yen, Vietnamese entrepreneur and educator
- Nguyễn Hoàng Yến, xiangqi player
- Võ Hoàng Yến, a beauty pageant contestant and model
