= International Christian University – Kyiv =

Private university in Kyiv, Ukraine

International Christian University - Kyiv
- Міжнародний християнський університет-Київ
- Type: Liberal Arts
- Active: 1992; 34 years ago – 2013; 13 years ago
- President: Prof. Anatoly Voichak
- Location: Kyiv, Ukraine
- Campus: Urban
- Website: http://icu.edu.ua/

International Christian University – Kyiv (ICU-Kyiv) (Ukrainian: Міжнародний Християнський університет-Київ) was a private university in Kyiv, Ukraine. It was founded in 1992 by Kyiv National Economic University and International University Vienna. In summer 2013 ICU-Kyiv closed that year following the bankruptcy of its Austrian founder International University Vienna in 2011.

== Accreditation and licenses ==
The International Christian University – Kyiv was established as a subsidiary of the International University Vienna. According to the founding charter, the International University – Vienna, represented by Goodheer Wil Charles, acted as the ICU founder. The Austrian institution was responsible for developing and transferring educational plans, course programs, and methodological regulations to the Kyiv branch.

As a result, diplomas issued by ICU Kyiv were simultaneously diplomas of the International University Vienna. The Ukrainian branch operated under an official license granted by the Ministry of Education and Science of Ukraine.

Official ICU Kyiv-Vienna licenses (Ukraine)

Accreditation confirmation for the International University Vienna

== Curriculum ==
Student training is based on the standard programs of Ukrainian economic universities and programs of American Business universities.

ICU-Kyiv's curriculum combines professional education and liberal arts. The institution offers a Bachelor of Business Administration degree with a choice of three majors: Management, Marketing, International Economics. Before 2007 Management information systems was offered as well. Classes at ICU-Kyiv are conducted in English or Ukrainian and faculty includes American, British and Ukrainian instructors. University used American grading system:

Letter Grade	Percentage	GPA
A	90-100	4.0
B	80-89	3.0
C	70-79	2.0
D	60-69	1.0
F	0-59	0.0
