= Tân Tạo University =

Private non-profit University in Vietnam

Coordinates: 10.8003°N 106.4550°E

Tan Tao University
- Motto: Per Sapientiam ad Astra (Latin)
- Motto in English: To the Stars through Knowledge
- Type: Private
- Established: 2010
- Provost: Dang Thi Hoang Yen
- Location: Long An province, Vietnam

Tân Tạo University (Vietnamese: Đại học Tân Tạo) is a private non-profit university in Long An Province, Vietnam. The founder and the main sponsor of TTU is Mme Dang Thi Hoang Yen. Tân Tạo is the university using the model of Duke University, USA and aspires to become the first Vietnamese university with a U.S.-style education. Programs at TTU are taught in English.

== Location and construction ==
Tân Tạo University is situated on a 503-acre area in Tan Duc E.City, Đức Hòa District, Long An Province. The university is designed and master planned by architectural firms from the United States.

The campus construction is expected to be completed within 15 years. The university's new facilities will have the capacity to serve ten thousand students and includes ten schools with sixty-four faculty buildings in a total area of 12 million square feet and a centrally located library.

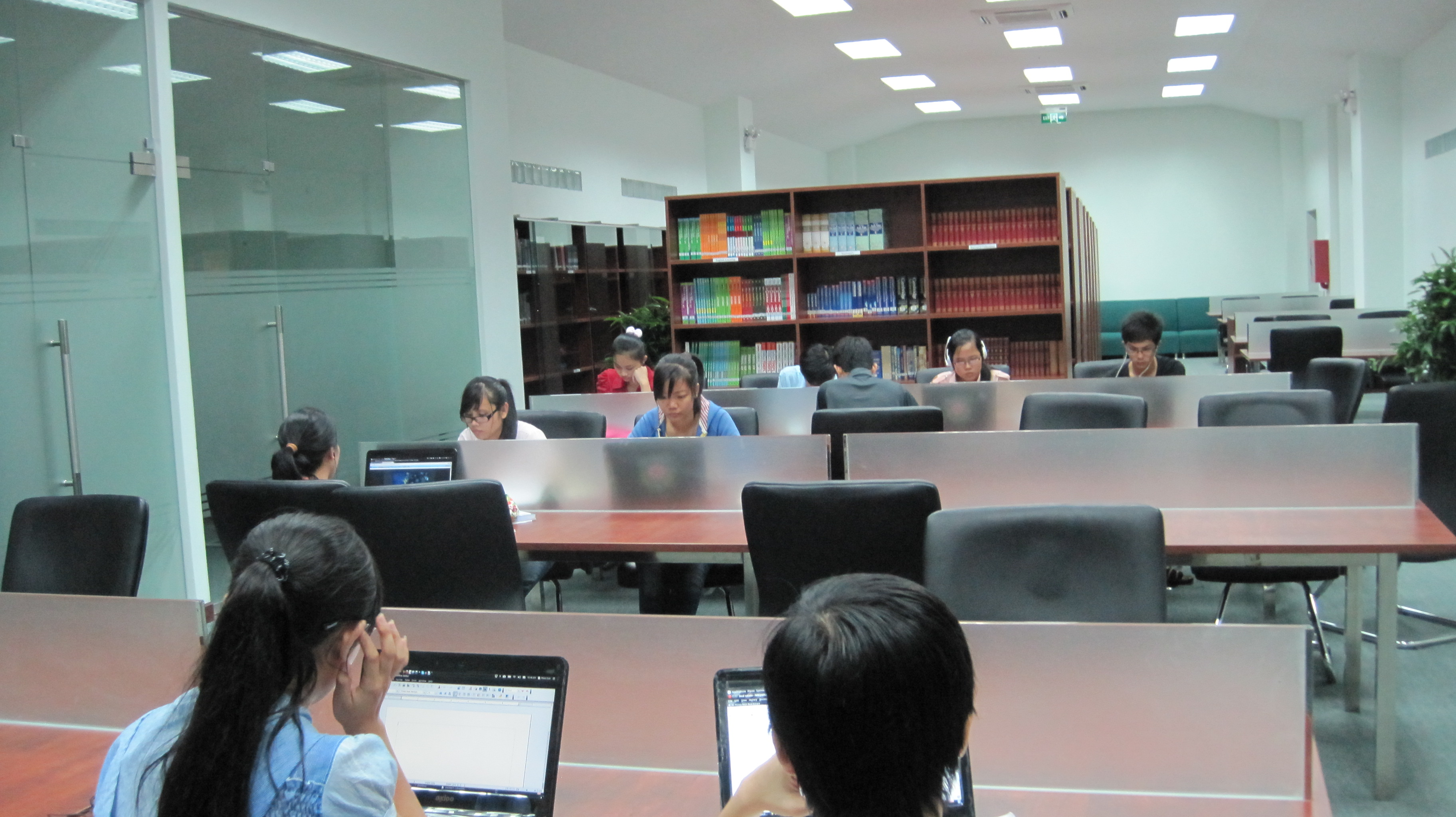
In the library, Tân Tạo University

== Academic program ==
Tân Tạo University offered the following undergraduate programs for the 2014–2015 school year:

No.	Major	School	Code	Group
1	Finance	School of Business & Economics	D340201	A, A1, D1
2	Accounting	School of Business & Economics	D340201	A, A1, D1
3	International Business	School of Business & Economics	D340120	A, A1, D1
4	Management	School of Business & Economics	D340101	A, A1, D1
5	Electrical Engineering	School of Engineering	D520201	A, A1
6	Computer Science	School of Engineering	D480101	A, A1, D1
7	English	School of Humanities	D220201	D1
8	Biotechnology	School of Biotechnology	D420201	B
9	Applied Biology	School of Biotechnology	D420203	B
10	General Medicine	School of Medicine	D720101	B
		Quota of admitted students	500	

Students at TTU will begin with U-PREP, a University Preparatory Semester. They will concentrate on the development of English and soft skills, including study skills and preparation for university-level classroom assignments. Full scholarships are available for U-PREP.

Academic programs in the university will normally require 120 units of credit or about four years of academic work.
