= Hajvery University =

Private university in Lahore, Pakistan

- جامعہ ہجویری
- Motto: Kashf al-Mahjub
- Motto in English: Unveiling the Veiled
- Type: Private
- Established: 2002
- Founder: Haji Mushtaq Ahmed (Late)
- Accreditation: HEC, PEC, PCP, PHEC, NCEAC, Council of Higher Education (Turkey), Erasmus Programme
- Chairman: Atif Mushtaq
- Rector: Prof. Dr. Muhammad Khalid Pervaiz
- Location: Lahore, Punjab, Punjab, Pakistan
- Campus: Urban
- Website: hup.edu.pk

The Hajvery University (HU) (Urdu: جامعۂ ھجویری) is a private university located in Lahore, Punjab, Pakistan.

== Overview ==
Hajvery University is chartered by Government of the Punjab. The Higher Education Commission (Pakistan) recognizes the university as a "category W" institution. It is named after Muslim Sufi Ali Hujwiri aka Data ganj Bakhsh. It has a main campus in the Industrial Area of Gulberg III, Lahore; a second campus (called the Euro Campus) near Gulburg-III, Lahore; a third campus in Sheikhupura (SKP Campus); a fourth campus under construction in Multan and a fifth campus planned for Dubai, UAE. The university has six constituent schools, each focused on a specific field of study: business; commerce and banking; engineering and computer science; fashion design; humanities and social sciences and pharmacy. The library at the main campus provides support for the courses offered with books, videos, journals, and other reference sources.

== Accreditation ==
Hajvery University is charter as a degree-awarding institution by the Government of the Punjab under the Hajvery University, Lahore Ordinance (LIX of 2002), granting it the authority to confer academic degrees. Academic programmes offered by the university are accredited by several national statutory and professional bodies, including:

- Pakistan Engineering Council (PEC) – for engineering-related programmes
- Pharmacy Council of Pakistan (PCP) – for pharmacy degree programmes
- Punjab Higher Education Commission (PHEC) – for institutional standards and quality assurance
- National Computing Education Accreditation Council (NCEAC) – for computing and software-related programmes
- National Business Education Accreditation Council (NBEAC) – for business and management programmes
- Allied Health Professionals Council (AHPC) – for allied health sciences, including physical therapy

== Campuses ==
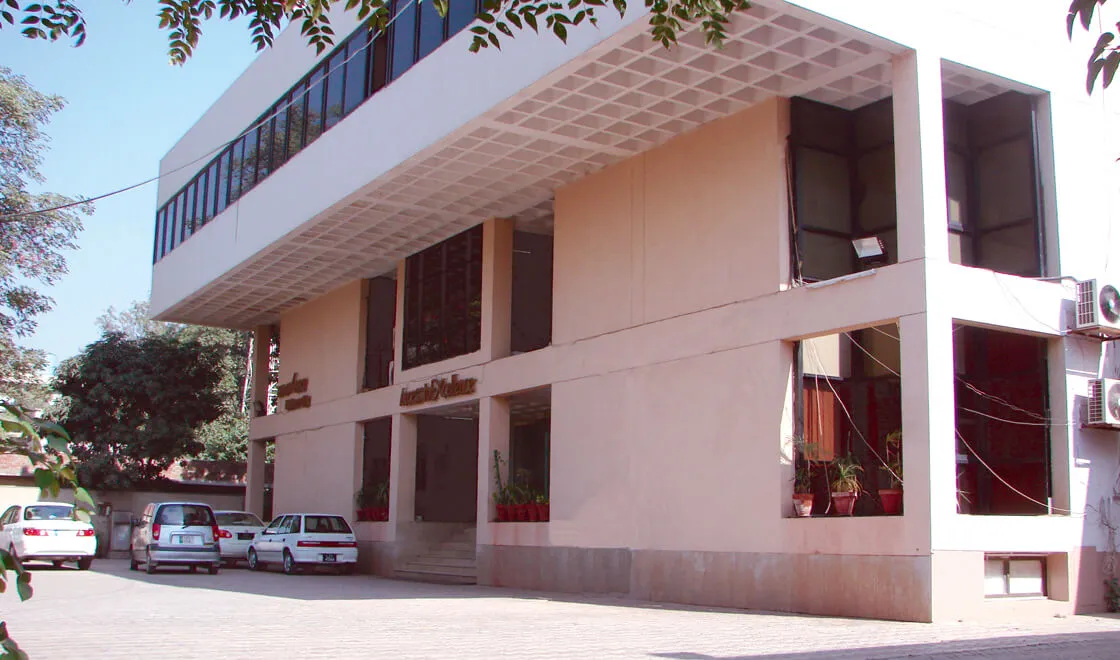
Outer View of main HU Campus building.

Hajvery University (HU) operates campuses located in Lahore and Sheikhupura, Punjab, Pakistan.

=== Lahore Campuses ===
The Main Campus, located in Gulberg III, Lahore, houses the university’s central administrative offices and examination services. It serves as the primary hub for academic coordination, institutional management, and policy implementation. The campus includes administrative offices, and core student service departments supporting academic and operational functions.

The Euro Campus, situated in the Industrial Area of Gulberg III, Lahore, facilitates admissions and student support services. The campus accommodates academic departments and administrative units, including admissions, examinations, and finance. It also provides classroom facilities, faculty offices, and support services required for undergraduate and postgraduate programmes.

=== Sheikhupura Campus ===
The Sheikhupura (SKP) Campus, located on Sargodha Road near Ghazi Minara in Sheikhupura, extends the university’s presence beyond Lahore. The campus offers academic programmes in selected disciplines and provides classroom facilities, laboratories where applicable, and administrative support services. The campus operates under the academic and administrative framework of the university’s central management.

== Academics & Faculties ==
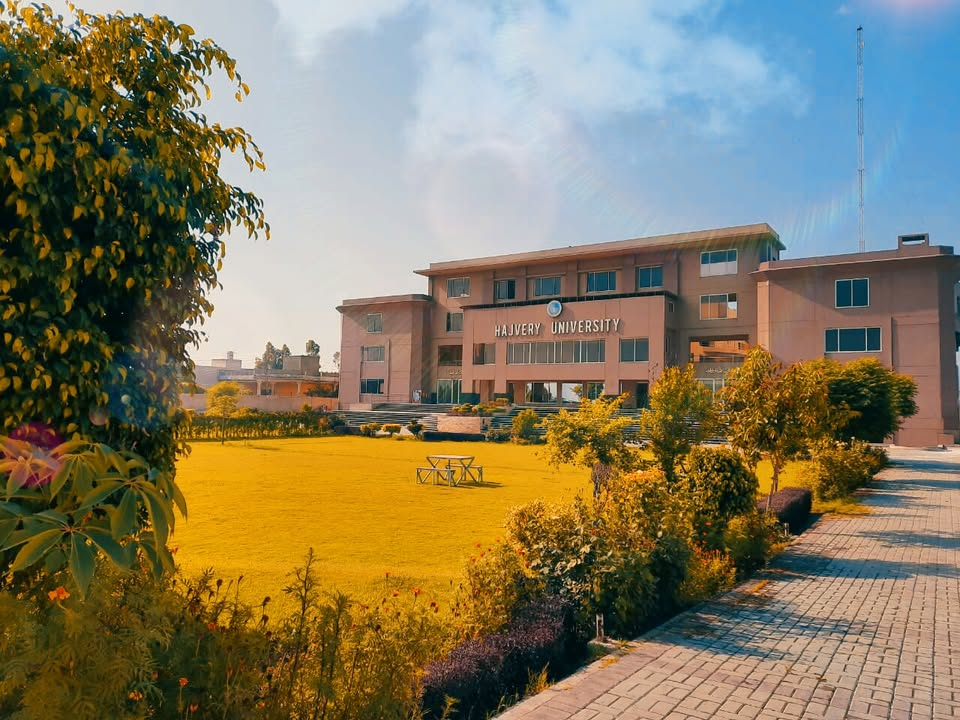
The main building of Hajvery University surrounded by landscaped gardens.

Hajvery University offers academic programmes at the undergraduate, postgraduate, and doctoral levels. Academic programmes at Hajvery University are offered through several faculties and departments, with curricula developed in line with national higher education guidelines and regulatory requirements. The university’s approved degree programmes are listed with the Higher Education Commission of Pakistan (HEC).

- Faculty of Business administration
- Faculty of Computer science
- Faculty of Pharmacy
- Faculty of Allied Health Sciences
- Faculty of Commerce
- Faculty of Textile & Fashion design
- Faculty of Humanities & Social sciences
- Faculty of Languages & Literature

== Student Club & Societies ==
- HU Debate Society
- HU Photography Society
- HU Newsletter and Yearbook Society
- HU Drama Society
- HU Alumni Society Alumni association
- Oikos Oikos Chapter (HUOS)
- HU AIESEC Chapter
- HU Management Society
- HU Sports Club
- HU Career development Society

== Collaborations and partnerships ==
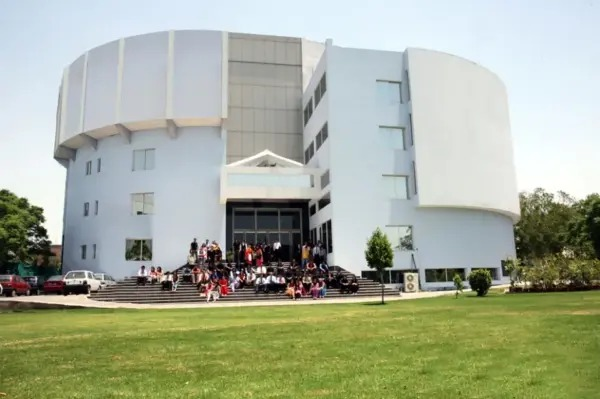
Euro Campus of Hajvery University.

Hajvery University has established academic collaborations through bilateral agreements with partner universities worldwide, facilitating student and faculty exchange, joint academic initiatives, and research cooperation. The university also maintains partnerships with 50 institutions participating in the Erasmus+ programme, supporting opportunities for international academic mobility.

In addition to its international collaborations, the university maintains linkages with local industry and corporate organizations. Through internship and corporate interaction initiatives, students are provided opportunities for internships, placements, and engagement with industry professionals through guest lectures and related activities.

The university’s collaborations also include academic–industry engagement, particularly in professional disciplines such as pharmacy and related fields. These activities include industrial visits, project-based learning opportunities, and participation in exhibitions aimed at connecting academic study with professional practice.

== Social and Philanthropic work ==
Hajvery University undertakes a range of social welfare, community service, and philanthropic activities alongside its academic programmes. According to university publications, the institution provides need-based and merit-based financial support, including scholarships for women, students with disabilities, and students from underserved regions, with the stated aim of facilitating access to higher education.

The university organises outreach activities such as free medical camps, meal distribution programmes, and charitable initiatives during Ramadan. These include campus-based iftar meal arrangements, which have been reported by independent media outlets as providing free meals to members of the local community.

Additional activities reported by the university include clothing donation drives, shelter assistance, water-filtration initiatives, tree-plantation campaigns, educational support for children, assistance to hospitals and orphanages, and the organisation of training workshops. Students, faculty, and staff participate in these activities through university societies and volunteer groups, sometimes in collaboration with non-governmental organizations, government bodies, and community organisations.

The university hosts a student chapter associated with Oikos International, which focuses on sustainability and responsible management education. Hajvery University has also engaged in cultural and interfaith initiatives; in 2013, it proposed the establishment of an academic chair in Sufism, intended to promote dialogue on peace and tolerance.

Through its Quality Enhancement Cell, the university reports integrating social research, community feedback, and volunteer engagement into institutional planning and quality-assurance processes, with an emphasis on civic responsibility and ethical citizenship.

== Gallery ==
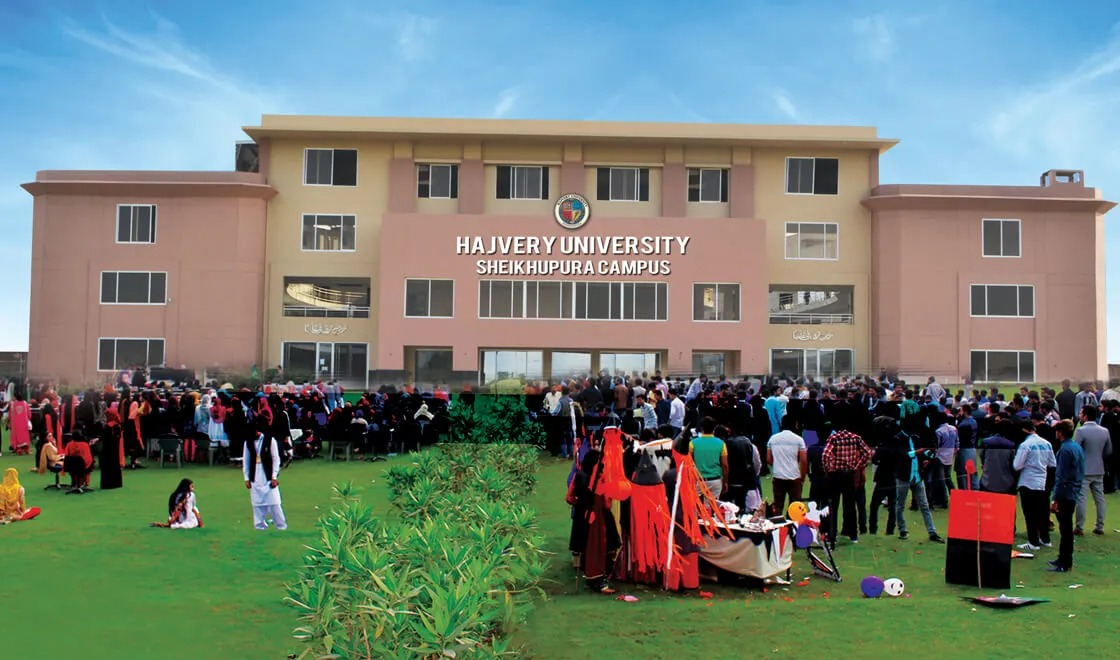
A view of Hajvery University’s Sheikhupura Campus.

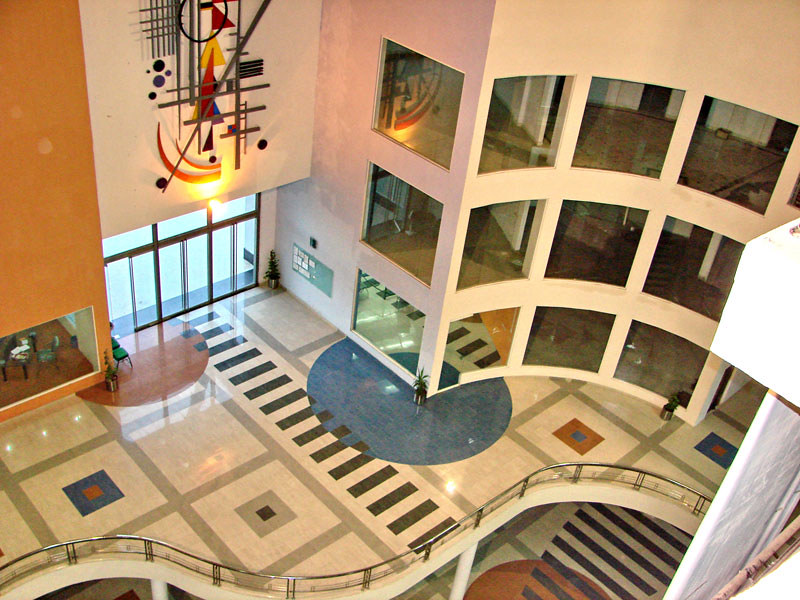
Interior atrium view of Hajvery University

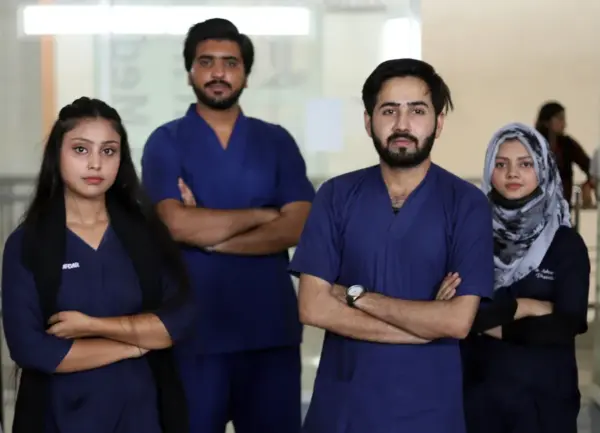
HU students in an anatomy academic session in the DPT laboratory.

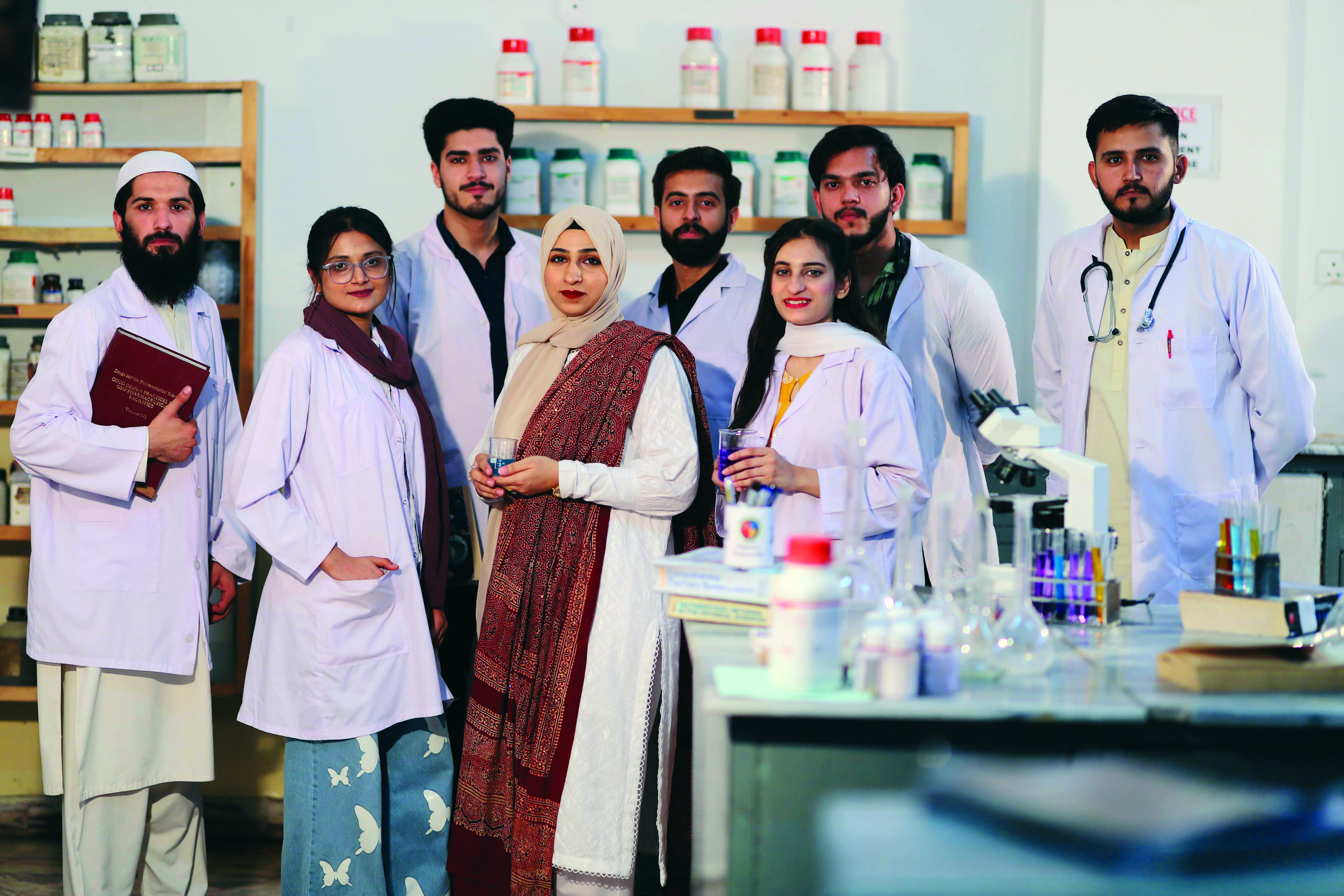
Students and faculty of Hajvery University during a practical session in the Pharmacy laboratory.

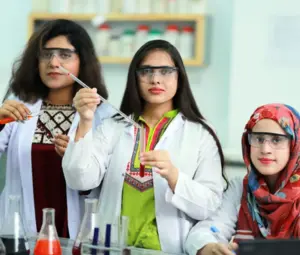
Female pharmacy students conducting a practical laboratory session while wearing safety goggles.

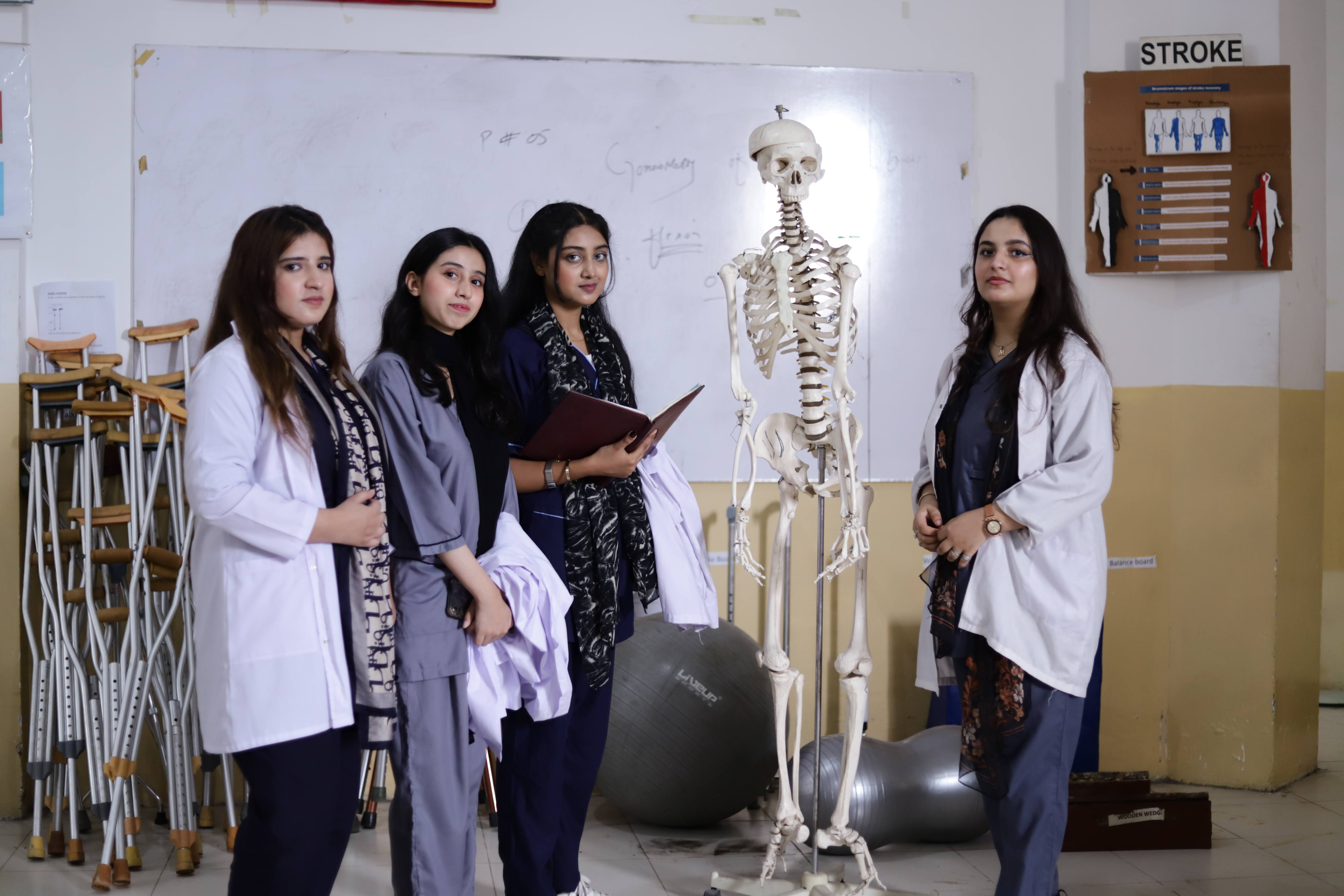
HU students during an anatomy practical session in the DPT laboratory.

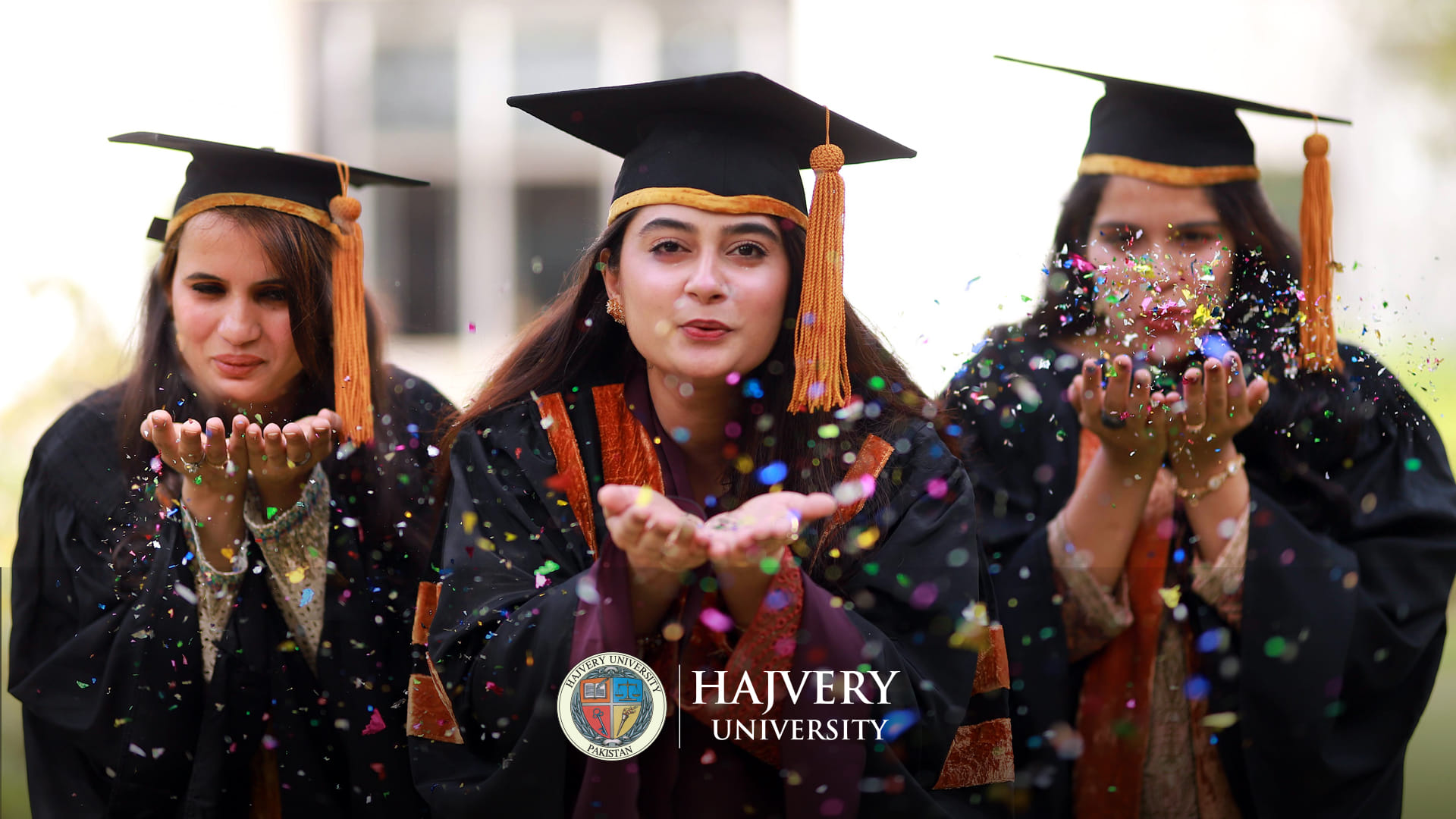
Female graduates wearing academic regalia celebrate during a graduation ceremony.

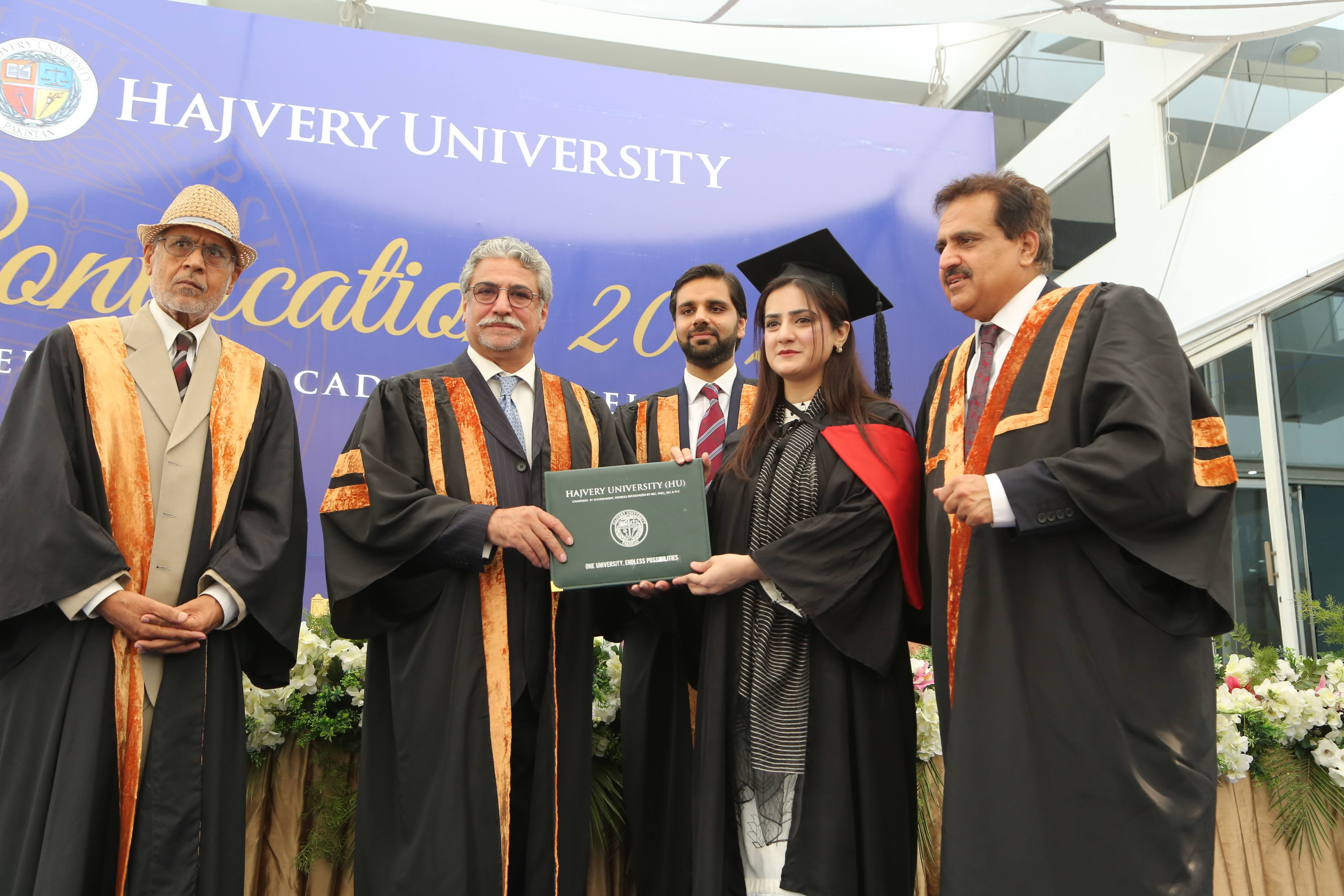
Graduates receiving academic degrees during an academic convocation ceremony.

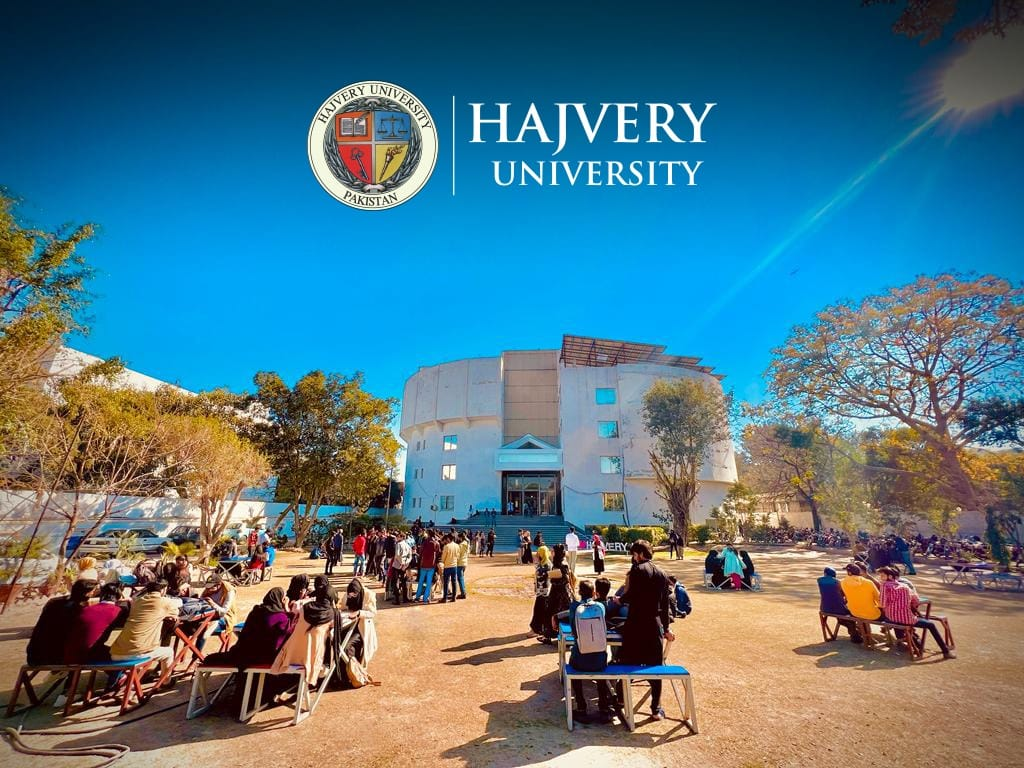
Main Academic Building at Hajvery University.

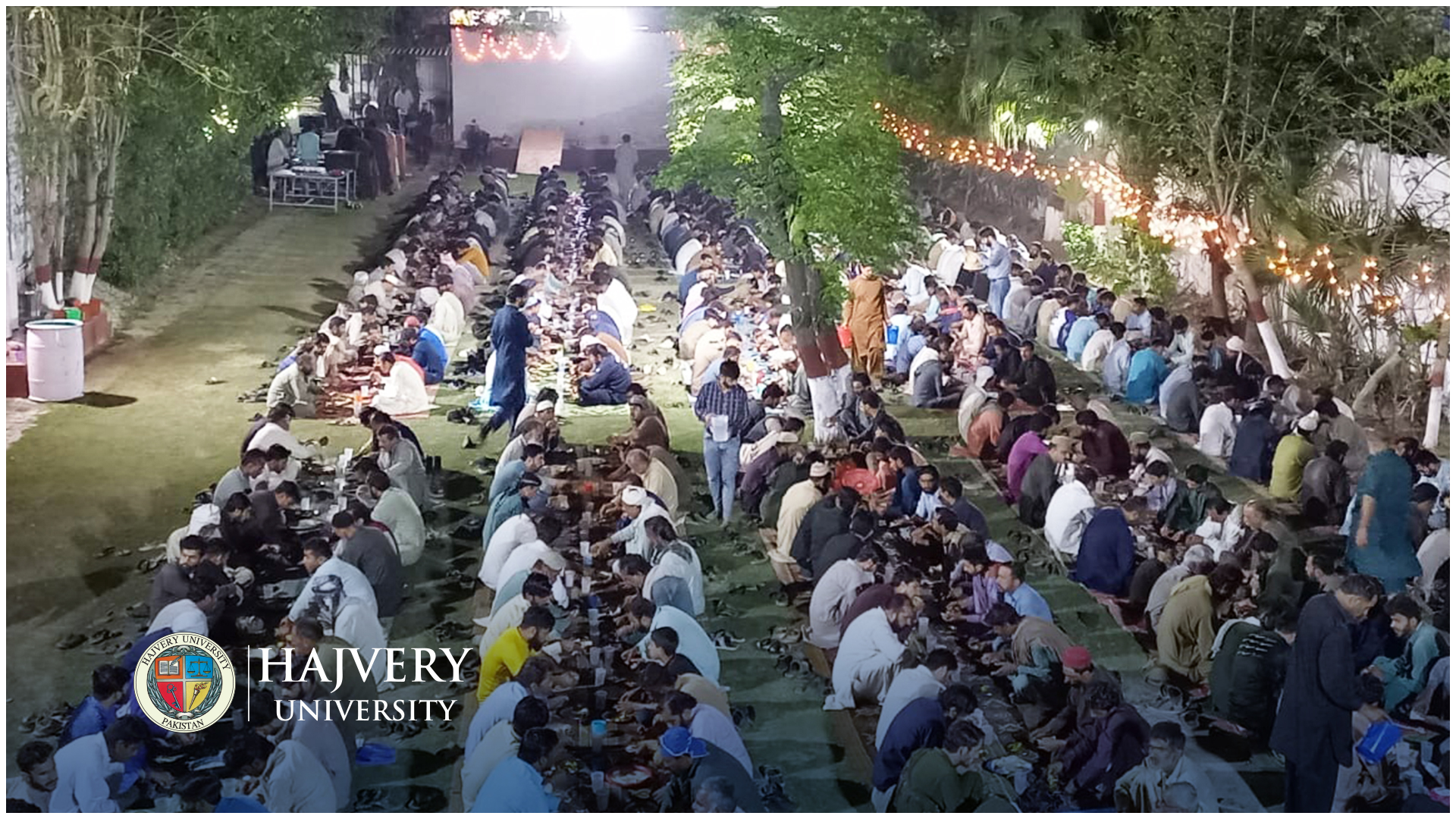
Community Iftar Gathering at HU.

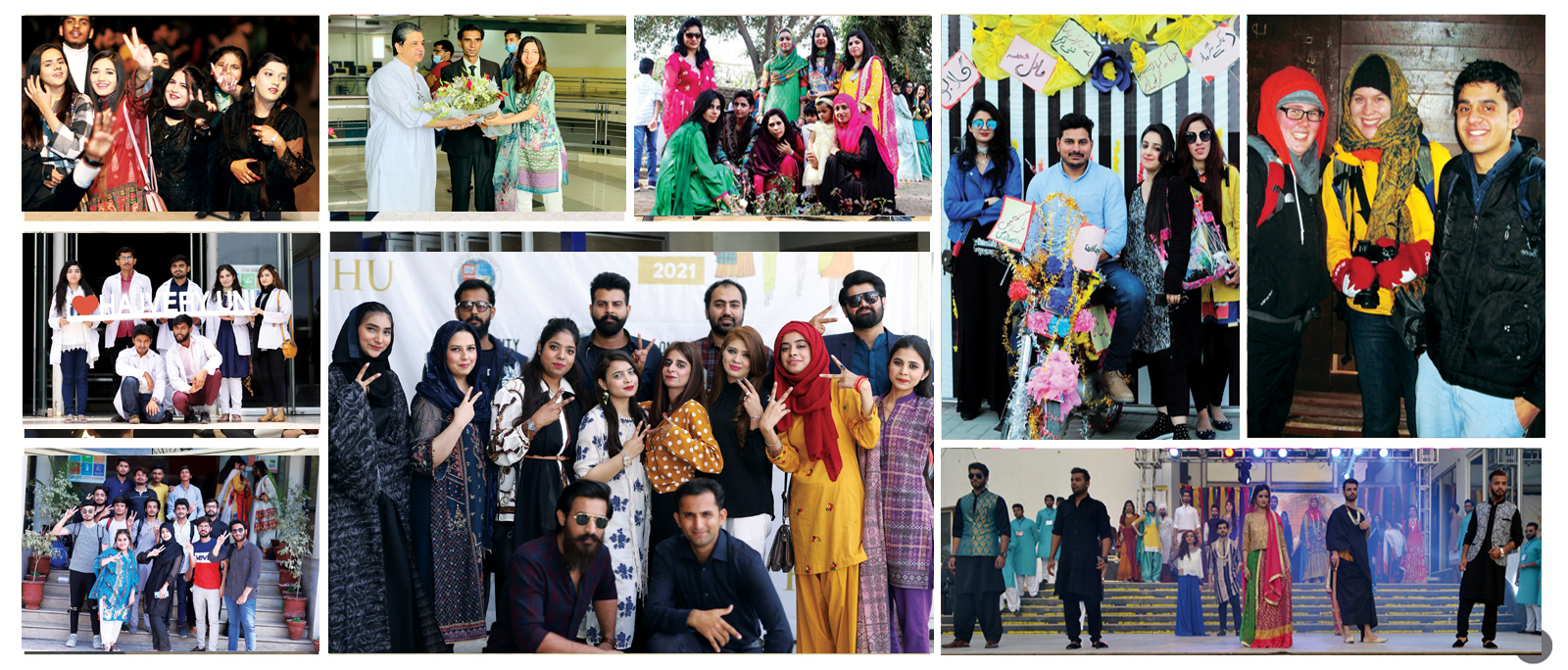
Student activities and cultural events at Hajvery University

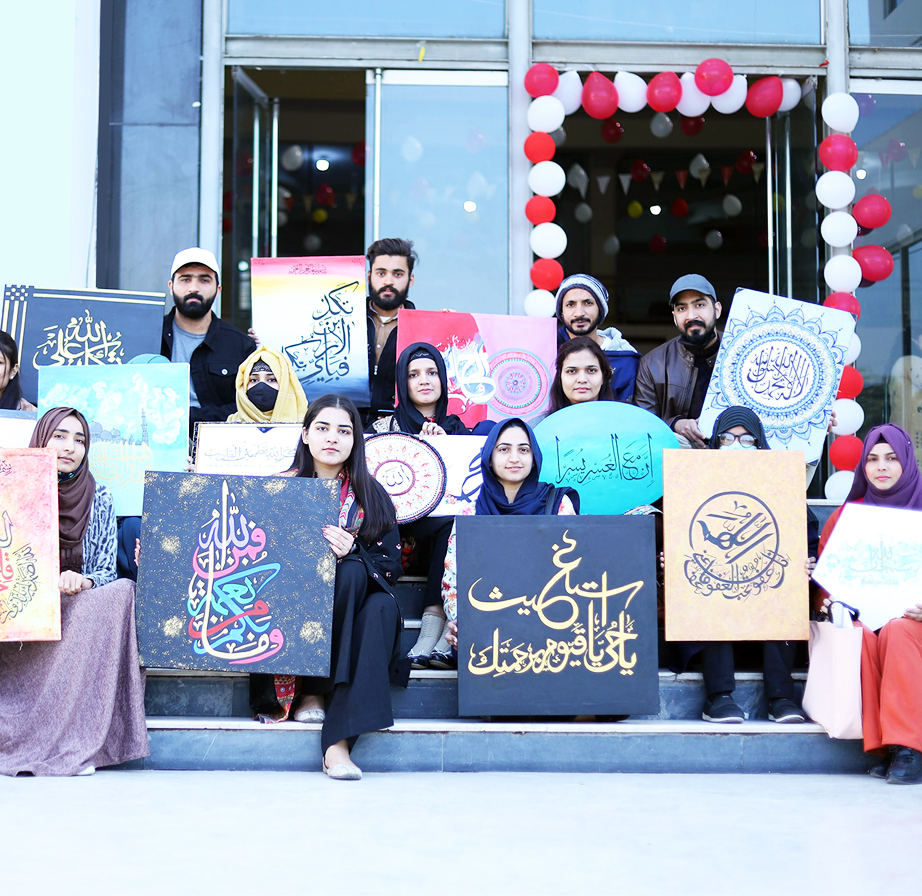
Students displaying Arabic calligraphy artwork at a university event.

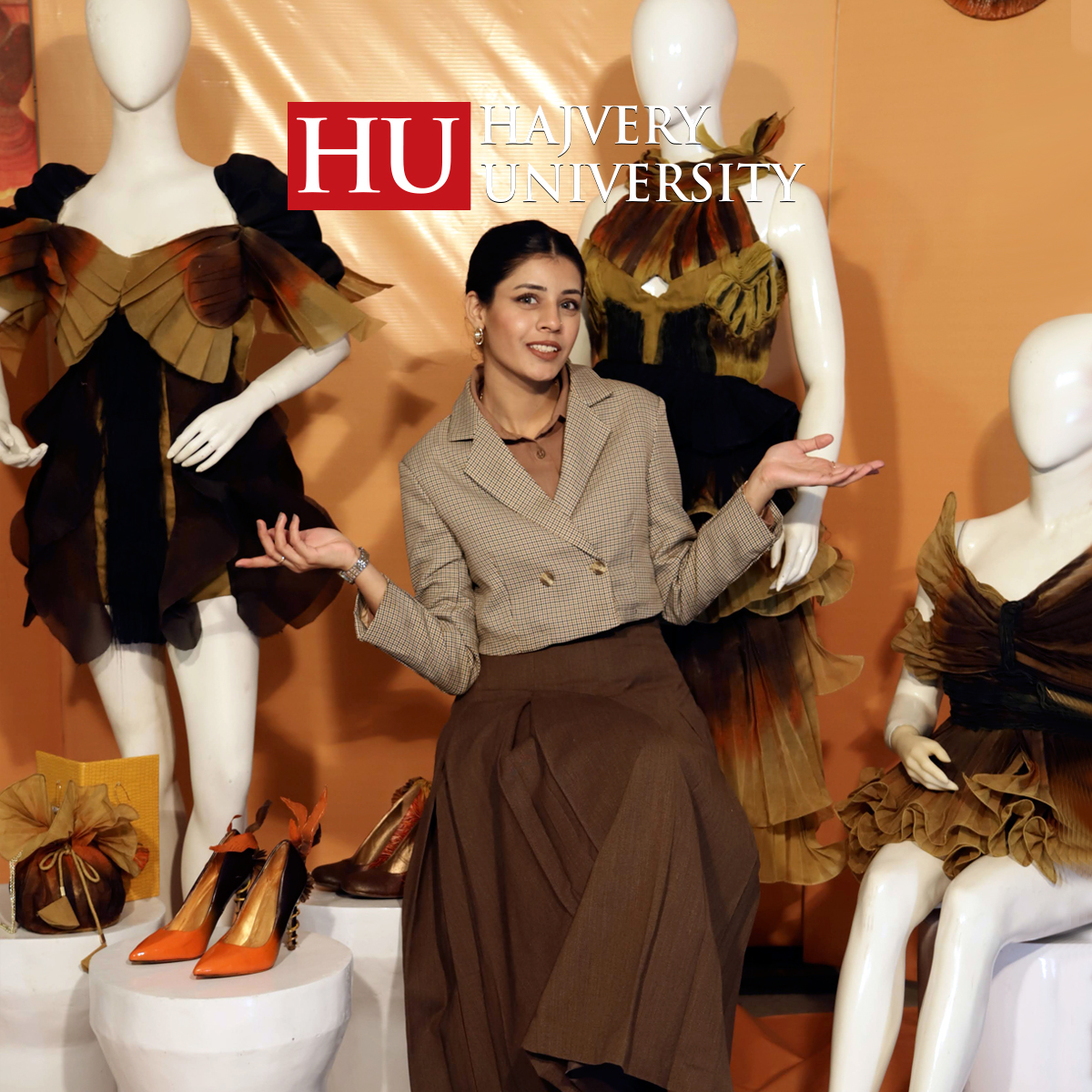
Fashion design display at Hajvery University
