= Ghazi Minara =

Village in Punjab, Pakistan

Ghazi Minara is a small village located in Sheikhupura District, Punjab, Pakistan. It lies near a railway crossing on 3 km Lahore-Sargodha Road, 6 km away from Sheikhupura city. The village is close to the historical site of Hiran Minar. The economy is dominated by agriculture and tourism. The Government Highschool Ghazi Minara was established in 1952. Hajvery University has a sub campus at Ghazi Minara.
