= International University Vienna =

Former Austrian university

The International University
- Type: Private
- Active: 1981–2011
- Campus: Vienna, Austria
- Website: www.iuvienna.ac

The International University (IU), Vienna was a private university located in Vienna, Austria, with subsidiaries in Kyiv, Ukraine. It was unaccredited during most of its existence. According to IU, it was chartered in 1980 by the U.S. state of Alabama as a private degree-granting postsecondary institution. The Vienna operation was founded in 1981 as "European Christian College". Beginning in 2001, IU was nationally accredited until 2003, when IU's university accreditation was withdrawn by the Austrian Accreditation Council. In 2011, IUV's sponsoring association went into bankruptcy and was shut down by court order.

In June 2011, Serbian private university Megatrend University announced that it would take over the institution's operation. This successor institution also went bankrupt and closed its doors in 2013.

== Programmes ==
- Undergraduate:
  - Bachelor of Business Administration (BBA)
  - Bachelor of Arts in Diplomatic Studies (BADS)
  - Bachelor of Arts in Global Business & International Relations (BAGBIR)
  - Bachelor of Arts in Philology, English Language (BARPEL)
- Graduate:
  - Advanced Master of Arts in Diplomatic & Strategic Studies (AMADSS)
  - Master of International Business (MIB)
  - Master of Business Administration (MBA)

== Legal status of academic degrees ==
Academic degrees granted by IU Vienna within the period of private university accreditation (4 January 2001 through 31 July 2003) are legally recognized in Austria and other EU countries. Any degrees granted outside this period lack accredited status, and their use may be restricted or illegal in some jurisdictions.

The institution stated that it was licensed to operate by the state of Alabama. However, this license expired in November 2010 and is not related to accreditation.

The Office of Degree Authorization of Oregon lists International University Vienna as an unaccredited foreign degree supplier and advises "employers, potential students, potential clients and others doing business with users of these degrees" to "take appropriate steps to determine the true nature of the credentials ... in order to ensure that degrees are genuine and are being used legally".

== Withdrawal of university accreditation ==
Between January 2001 and July 2003, IU Vienna was accredited as a private university by the accreditation council of the Austrian government. The initial accreditation had been granted only for a period of three years due to concerns on some critical issues (recruitment of scientific staff, research, library). The accreditation was withdrawn by the council on the 31st of July 2003.

== Bankruptcy ==
In April 2011, bankruptcy proceedings were initiated against IUV. On 6 May 2011, the commercial court of Vienna ordered it shut.
