= PEF Private University of Management Vienna =

Coordinates: 48°11′36″N 16°22′08″E

PEF Private University of Management
- PEF Privatuniversität für Management
- Type: Private
- Established: 2002
- Location: Brahmsplatz 3 A-1040 Vienna, Austria, Vienna, Austria
- Website: http://www.pef.at/

PEF Private University of Management was a private university in Vienna, Austria. It had been accredited by the Austrian Accreditation Council in June 2002. It concentrated on master's programmes in the areas of social and economic science. In 2007, the university was re-accredited until 2014, but closed for economic reasons in March 2012.

PEF had offered four programs

- MBA Intra- and Entrepreneurship
- MSc Human Resource Management and Organizational Development
- MSc Construction Management
- MSc Coaching
