= Hanseatic University Rostock =

Coordinates: 54.171°N 12.079°E

Hanseatic University (HU)
- Type: Private
- Established: 2007
- Chairman: Wolf Schäfer
- Students: 4
- Location: Rostock-Warnemünde, Mecklenburg-Vorpommern, Germany
- Website: www.hanseuni.de

The Hanseatic University (HU) in Rostock-Warnemünde was a private university in Rostock, Germany. Founded in 2007, it was the second private institution of higher education in Germany to be granted university status by the government. In August 2008, when it had three students, it ceased activities, and it finally closed down March 2009.

== History ==
In 2002, the two business consultants Peter L. Pedersen and Knut Einfeldt took part in a business plan contest by the government of the German state of Mecklenburg-Vorpommern, presented a plan for setting up a private university operated as a business institution, and won the first and third prize.

In 2003, the decision was made to establish the private university in Mecklenburg-Vorpommern, which was then narrowed down to the city of Rostock in 2004. The company set to run the university was formed in September 2004. In spring of 2007, Educationtrend AG, a holding from Hamburg, bought 97.8% of the shares in the Hanseatic University and, at the same time, increased its share capital. The institution was then granted university status by the state ministry of education in July 2007.

The founding president, Wolf Schäfer, was formerly Vice-President of the Helmut Schmidt University of the German Armed Forces in Hamburg.

The university planned to break even within five years with 700 students paying 7500 euro each per semester. 25 students enrolled, but only five commenced studies in "Business Administration" and "Business Information Technology" in October 2007.

Because of changed interests of the owner, enrollments were stopped in August 2008, it was decided to cease operations and the remaining three students were offered to continue their studies at the International University in Germany, in Bruchsal, also owned by Educationtrend AG. However, this university also closed.

As of March 2009, the Hanseatic University Rostock was closed and its website closed down. Professor Heinz Eckart Klingelhöfer and two other former employees sued the university's owner, Educationtrend AG, for damages.

== Degrees ==
Bachelor courses were intended to run for three years (worth 180 ECTS points) and the master programs for two years (120 ECTS points), and two faculties were planned: Economics (with studies in Business Administration, Business Information Technology, and Global Management), and Law (planned for winter 2008).

== Athletics ==
The university planned its own Hanseatic Yachting Club for the spring of 2008. Jürgen Knuth, twice world sailing champion, was appointed General Manager for the yachting club.

== See also ==
- List of universities in Germany (does not include this university)

== Sources ==
- "www.kultus-mv.de".
- "Kapital gesucht: Die erste Uni will an die Börse - Spiegel Online". Der Spiegel. 2003-11-17.
- "Professor klagt gegen Hanse-Uni - Rostock - Ostsee Zeitung". 2009-07-16. Archived from the original on 2012-03-03.
- "Private Hanse-Uni Rostock startet mit 25 Studenten - Hamburger Abendblatt". 2007-10-23.
- Titz, Christoph (2008-08-21). "Rostocker Privatuni: Schiffbruch an der Ostseeküste - Spiegel Online". Der Spiegel.
- "International University in Germany".
