= Tan Tao Group =

Company of Vietnam

ITACO
- Company type: Publicly listed subsidiary
- Traded as: ITA
- Industry: Infrastructure development, Real estate
- Founded: 1996; 30 years ago
- Founder: Mme. Dang Thi Hoang Yen
- Headquarters: Bình Tân district, Ho Chi Minh City, Vietnam
- Products: Industrial park development, real estate investment, property management
- Total equity: $736.96 million (as of December 2021)
- Website: www.itaexpress.com.vn

Tan Tao Group is a leading industrial park and infrastructure developer in Vietnam, specializing in industrial parks development, land development, infrastructure and power development, and telecom and network development. Tan Tao Group's key subsidiary, Tan Tao Investment & Industry Corp (“ITACO”), is the first privately managed and leading industrial park developer in Vietnam. ITACO is the first private industrial park developer listed on the Ho Chi Minh Stock Exchange (Stock Code: ITA). ITACO is one of 9 leading companies in Vietnam included into the Russell Vietnam Index 10 and one of 10 companies with the largest market capitalization and highest liquidity included into S&P Vietnam 10 Index. According to the 2011 ranking of Vietnam's top 1000 companies with the highest corporate income tax contribution conducted by the Vietnam Report Company in coordination with VietnamNet and Tax magazine of the General Department of Taxation, Tan Tao Investment & Industry Corporation is ranked 129th and 35th among Vietnam's top 200 private companies with the highest corporate income tax contribution.

== History ==
Tan Tao Group was established in 1993 in Ho Chi Minh City originally as Hoang Yen Limited Liability Company. Since its inception, Madam Dang Thi Hoang Yen has served as the group's chairwoman of the board.

Year	Key Milestones
2010	The 18th one – TanTao Energy Company (TEC) was born to develop one of the largest Coal-Fired Power Plants in Vietnam.
2009	The 10th one –ITAWATER was born to operate the water treatment & sewage Treatment Plants in IPs.; Kien Luong infrastructure Complex Ground Breaking Ceremony; Dak Mi2 Hydro Power Plant infrastructure Ground Breaking Ceremony
2008	The 7th one – Vietnam Broadcasting Corporation (VBC) was born to be a pioneer in the Television Industry.; Tan Tao University Ground Breaking Ceremony.; The 6th Bird - Tan Tao Energy Development Corporation (TEDC) was born to penetrate energy area in Vietnam.
2007	TanTao Group – TTG became a Branding Name.; Launch of Tan Duc Industrial Park - Phase 2.
2006	The First IP development company got listed on the HOSE.; Launch of Nhon Hoi Industrial Park.
2005	Launch of Tan Duc Industrial Park - Phase 1.
2004	Launch of Tan Tao –Vinatex Industrial Park.
2003	Launch of Tan Tao Industrial Park - Phase 2.
2002	The Fifth one - TASERCO was born to provide the first class Services for Investors.; US Southern Homes was the first Licensed to develop Real estate in USA.
2001	Launch of Nhon Trach Industrial Park.
2000	The Third one – ITATRANS was born to be the first ICD Port for IPs in HCM City.
1997	Launch of Tan Tao Industrial Park – Phase 1.
1996	ITACO - The first private sector to be granted land for industrial park development in Vietnam.
1994	The Second Bird was Southern Engineering & Architecture Company – S.E.I was launched.
1993	The first Bird of Tan Tao Group was born – Hoang Yen Company Limited.

== Businesses ==
Tan Tao Group 's major subsidiaries include:

- Tan Tao Investment and Industry Corporation (ITACO)
- Tan Duc Investment Corporation
- ITA Water Corporation
- Saigon - Mekong City Investment Corporation
- Tan Tao Services Utilization – Office and Warehousing Trade Corporation (TASERCO)
- Tan Tao Energy Development Corporation (TEDC)
- Tan Tao Energy Corporation (TEC)
- Southern Engineering Informatics Investment Corporation (S.E.I)
- ITA-ways Corporation
- Tan Tao Freight Forwarding and Warehousing Corporation - ITA Trans Corporation
- Tan Tao Cement Corporation
- Tan Tao Urban Development and Investment Corporation
- ITA Telecommunication Corporation
- Vietnam Broadcasting Corporation (VBC)- website: www.vbc.com.vn.
- RealTV Corporation - website:www.realtv.com.vn
- Tan Tao University - website: www.ttu.edu.vn

== Investments ==
Since its initial operation in 1996, the Group has developed several large-scale industrial parks in Vietnam. For industrial parks, the Group provides ancillary services to tenants such as waste treatment services, security services, utilities and telecommunications services.

- Industrial Parks
  - Tan Tao Industrial Park: is located in the Binh Tan District of Ho Chi Minh City and is approximately 12 km from the Ho Chi Minh City centre and 12 km from the Tan Son Nhat International Airport.
  - Tan Duc Industrial Park: is located in the Duc Hoa District of Long An Province and is approximately 26 km from Ho Chi Minh City, 28 km from the Tan Son Nhat International Airport and 29 km from the Saigon Port.
- Infrastructure
  - Nam Du Deep Water Seaport: The project with total investment capital of $800 million would be implemented in two phases: In the first phase, the seaport will have total yearly designed capacity of 12 million tonnes of coal and five million tonnes of goods. In addition, the port will be able to receive 80,000 dwt carriers. In the second phase, the seaport's designed capacity will be raised to 50 million tonnes of coal, 12 million tonnes of goods per year as well as having capacity to welcome 150,000-200,000 dwt.
  - Tan Tao University (TTU): It is the first Vietnam–American University that is accredited on US Education standards that will enable its scholars to spend their 3rd year in the US. Graduates from TTU can also be admitted to post-graduate programs internationally.
- Energy Development

The Group has been developing Kien Luong thermal power complex with an aggregate capacity of 4,400-5200 MW in Kien Luong province in the South of Vietnam and several hydro projects which will represent over 10% of the country's installed capacity by 2020. The Complex comprises three coal-fired power plants (Phase I: 1,200 MW, Phase II: 1,200-2,000 MW, and Phase III: 2,000 MW). The Complex is planned to be one of the largest power generation complexes in the country meeting the power requirement of the Southern Vietnam.

== Charity activities ==
On September 30, 2007, Tan Tao Group launched three Foundations: ITA Scholarship, ITA Medical Aid and ITA Veterans Assistance with the attendance of President Nguyen Minh Triet. Since Tan Tao Group funded a total of 21 billion dong through three Foundations and hopes to continually assist the community in meeting their basic needs. Tan Tao Group hopes to encourage other corporations to join in its efforts in bettering the human lives in Vietnam.

- ITA-Scholarship: This foundation gives scholarships to poor but talented students. Aid is also given to teachers in need, encouraging them to teach in remote, rural areas.
- ITA Medical Aid: This foundation supports victims of Agent Orange and patients in need of financial assistance.
- ITA Veterans Assistance: This foundation aids victims of war. Survivors of war including the Federation of the Vietnamese Mothers, injured veterans as well as victims of natural disasters.
- Hoa Trang Nguyen Prize: It was established in 2008 by the Tan Tao Group in coordination with the Ministry of Education and Training, the Party Central Committee's Commission for Popularization and Education, Ho Chi Minh Communist Youth Union Central Committee, and the Vietnam Association of non-state universities and colleges. The prize aims to annually honor students with the best performance in high schools, or with first national prize, international medals and highest scores in national university entrance exams.
