= Dang Thi Hoang Yen =

Vietnamese business woman

Đặng Thị Hoàng Yến
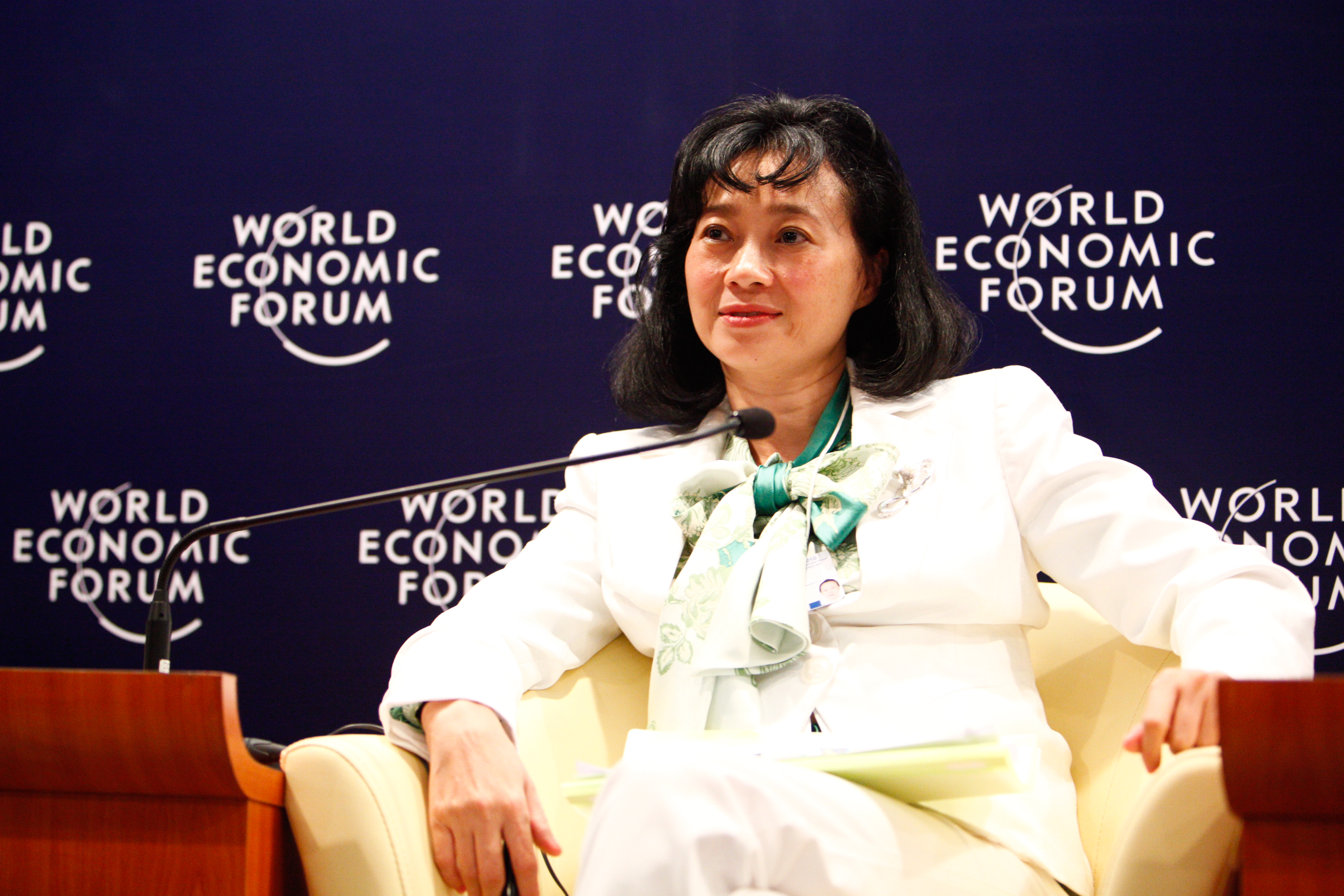
- Dang Thi Hoang Yen, Chairwoman and Chief Executive Officer of Tan Tao Group, Vietnam, at the World Economic Forum on East Asia in Ho Chi Minh City, Vietnam, on June 7, 2010
- Born: 1 June 1959; Hải Phòng Province, Vietnam
- Occupations: Entrepreneur, educator
- Known for: Founding and leading Tan Tao Group, Tan Tao University

Maya Dangelas (born Dang Thi Hoang Yen) is the Executive Chairman of Tan Tao Group, President of Tan Tao University, Chair of the Vietnam-US Business Forum, Member of ESCAP Business Advisory Council, Member of ASEAN Business Advisory Council, and Member of World Economic Forum’s Global Agenda Council on South-East Asia.

== Career ==
She graduated from the University of Economics Ho Chi Minh City. She worked for the Vietnamese Government for 13 years, then moved on to create her first own company in 1993. The company is now known as Tan Tao Group and it grew into the leading Industrial Park & Infrastructure Developer in Vietnam. Tan Tao Group created hundreds of thousands of jobs across Vietnam and provided a solid platform for the country’s rapid economic progress. The Group has 21 subsidiaries across multiple sectors including land development, construction, and media broadcasting. ITACO – the publicly listed subsidiary of Tan Tao Group, promptly became one of nine blue-chip stocks to be established as part of the Global Russell Vietnam Index 10 and the Standard & Poor’s Vietnam 10 Index. According to the 2011 ranking of Vietnam’s top 1,000 companies with the highest corporate income tax contribution conducted by the Vietnam Report Company in coordination with VietnamNet and Tax magazine of the General Department of Taxation, ITACO is ranked 129th and 35th among Vietnam's top 200 private companies with the highest corporate income tax contribution. In parallel with running successful businesses in Vietnam, she has also achieved success in the establishment of real estate development companies namely US Southern Homes LP and US Southern Corporation in the US. An international tribunal ruled in her favor in a $2.5 billion arbitration lawsuit against the Vietnamese government that lasted from 2020 to 2022.

== Personal life ==
Dang Thi Hoang Yen is the mother of 3 daughters: Nguyen Phuong Anh ̣(b. 1985), Nguyen Dang Hai Anh (b. 1990), and Dang Nguyen Tam Anh (b. 2007).

== Social ==
She is also actively engaged in social and charity activities with the establishment of ITA Scholarship, ITA Medical Aid and ITA Veterans Assistance for the purpose of providing education, medical support and financial assistance to the needy in Vietnam. Annually, thousands of scholarships are awarded to outstanding students nationwide. At the same time she donated and founded Tan Tao University (TTU), the country’s first Vietnam–American University that is accredited on US Education standards that will enable its scholars to spend their 3rd year in the US. Graduates from TTU can also be admitted to post-graduate programs internationally.

List of awards received: Humanitarian Award 2011 by San Francisco - Ho Chi Minh City Sister City Committee, the Prime Minister Certificate of Merit (2009), Golden Rose Award (2008), Typical Entrepreneur Award (2006, 2007), Business Super Star Awards, Long An Province People Committee’s Certificate of Merit (2007, 2008, 2009), Ho Chi Minh City People Committee’s Certificate of Merit (2006, 2007)...
