= VUCA =

Volatility, uncertainty, complexity and ambiguity in leadership

VUCA is an acronym based on the leadership theories of Warren Bennis and Burt Nanus, to describe or to reflect on the volatility, uncertainty, complexity and ambiguity of general conditions and situations. The U.S. Army War College introduced the concept of VUCA in 1987, to describe a more complex multilateral world perceived as resulting from the end of the Cold War. More frequent use and discussion of the term began from 2002. It has subsequently spread to strategic leadership in organizations, from for-profit corporations to education.

== Meaning ==
The VUCA framework provides a lens through which organizations can interpret their challenges and opportunities. It emphasizes strategic foresight, insight, and the behavior of entities within organizations. Furthermore, it highlights both systemic and behavioral failures often associated with organizational missteps.

V = Volatility: Characterizes the rapid and unpredictable nature of change.

U = Uncertainty: Denotes the unpredictability of events and issues.

C = Complexity: Describes the intertwined forces and issues, making cause-and-effect relationships unclear.

A = Ambiguity: Points to the unclear realities and potential misunderstandings stemming from mixed messages.

These elements articulate how organizations perceive their current and potential challenges. They establish the parameters for planning and policy-making. Interacting in various ways, they can either complicate decision-making or enhance the ability to strategize, plan, and progress. Essentially, VUCA lays the groundwork for effective management and leadership.

The VUCA framework is a conceptual tool that underscores the conditions and challenges organizations face when making decisions, planning, managing risks, driving change, and solving problems. It primarily shapes an organization's ability to:

1. Anticipate the key issues that emerge.
2. Understand the repercussions of particular issues and actions.
3. Appreciate how variables interrelate.
4. Prepare for diverse scenarios and challenges.
5. Interpret and tackle pertinent opportunities.

VUCA serves as a guideline for fostering awareness and preparedness in various sectors, including business, the military, education, and government. It provides a roadmap for organizations to develop strategies for readiness, foresight, adaptation, and proactive intervention.

== Themes ==
VUCA, as a system of thought, revolves around an idea expressed by Andrew Porteous: "Failure in itself may not be a catastrophe. Still, failure to learn from failure is." This perspective underlines the significance of resilience and adaptability in leadership. It suggests that beyond mere competencies, it is behavioural nuances, like the ability to learn from failures and adapt, that distinguish exceptional leaders from average ones. Leaders using VUCA as a guide often see change not just as inevitable but as something to anticipate.

Within VUCA, several thematic areas of consideration emerge, providing a framework for introspection and evaluation:

- Knowledge management and sense-making: An exploration into how we organize and interpret information.
- Planning and readiness considerations: A reflection on our preparedness for unforeseen challenges.
- Process management and resource systems: A contemplation on our efficiency in resource utilization and system deployment.
- Functional responsiveness and impact models: Understanding our capacity to adapt to changes.
- Recovery systems and forward practices: An inquiry into our resilience and future-oriented strategies.
- Systemic failures: A philosophical dive into organizational vulnerabilities.
- Behavioural failures: Exploring the human tendencies that lead to mistakes.

Within the VUCA system of thought, an organization's ability to navigate these challenges is closely tied to its foundational beliefs, values, and aspirations. Those enterprises that consider themselves prepared and resolved align their strategic approach with VUCA's principles, signaling a holistic awareness.

The essence of VUCA philosophy also emphasizes the need for a deep-rooted understanding of one's environment, spanning technical, social, political, market, and economic realms.

Psychometrics which measure fluid intelligence by tracking information processing when faced with unfamiliar, dynamic, and vague data can predict cognitive performance in VUCA environments.

=== Social categorization ===
==== Volatility ====
Volatility refers to the different situational social-categorizations of people due to specific traits or reactions that stand out in particular situations. When people act based on a specific situation, there is a possibility that the public categorizes them into a different group than they were in a previous situation. These people might respond differently to individual situations due to social or environmental cues. The idea that situational occurrences cause certain social categorization is known as volatility and is one of the main aspects of self-categorization theory.

Sociologists use volatility to better understand the impacts of stereotypes and social categorization on the situation at hand and any external forces that may cause people to perceive others differently. Volatility is the changing dynamic of social categorization in environmental situations. The dynamic can change due to any shift in a situation, whether social, technical, biological, or anything else. Studies have been conducted, but finding the specific component that causes the change in situational social categorization has proven challenging.

Two distinct components link individuals to their social identities. The first component is normative fit, which pertains to how a person aligns with the stereotypes and norms associated with their particular identity. For instance, when a Hispanic woman is cleaning the house, people often associate gender stereotypes with the situation, while her ethnicity is not a central concern. However, when this same woman eats an enchilada, ethnicity stereotypes come to the forefront, while her gender is not the focal point. The second social cue is comparative fit. This is when a specific characteristic or trait of a person is prominent in certain situations compared to others. For example, as mentioned by Bodenhausen and Peery, when there is one woman in a room full of men. She stands out, because she is the only one of her gender. However, all of the men are clumped together because they do not have any specific traits that stand out. Comparative fit shows that people categorize others based on the relative social context. In a particular situation, particular characteristics are made obvious because others around that individual do not possess that characteristic. However, in other cases, this characteristic may be the norm and would not be a key characteristic in the categorization process.

People can be less critical of the same person in different scenarios. For example, when looking at an African American man on the street in a low-income neighborhood and the same man inside a school in a high-income neighborhood, people will be less judgmental when seeing him in school. Nothing else has changed about this man, other than his location. When individuals are spotted in certain social contexts, the basic-level categories are forgotten, and the more partial categories are brought to light. This helps to describe the problems of situational social-categorization. This also illustrates how stereotypes can shift the perspectives of those around an individual.

==== Uncertainty ====
Uncertainty in the VUCA framework occurs when the availability or predictability of information in events is unknown. Uncertainty often occurs in volatile environments consisting of complex unanticipated interactions. Uncertainty may occur with the intention to imply causation or correlation between the events of a social perceiver and a target. Situations where there is either a lack of information to prove why perception is in occurrence or informational availability but lack of causation, are where uncertainty is salient.

The uncertainty component of the framework serves as a grey area and is compensated by the use of social categorization and/or stereotypes. Social categorization can be described as a collection of people that have no interaction but tend to share similar characteristics. People tend to engage in social categorization, especially when there is a lack of information surrounding the event. Literature suggests that default categories tend to be assumed in the absence of any clear data when referring to someone's gender or race in the essence of a discussion.

Individuals often associate general references (e.g. people, they, them, a group) with the male gender, meaning people = male. This usually occurs when there is insufficient information to distinguish someone's gender clearly. For example, when discussing a written piece of information, most assume the author is male. If an author's name is unavailable (due to lack of information), it is difficult to determine the gender of the author through the context of whatever was written. People automatically label the author as male without having any prior basis of gender, thus placing the author in a social category. This social categorization happens in this example, but people will also assume someone is male if the gender is not known in many other situations as well.

Social categorization occurs in the realm of not only gender, but also race. Default assumptions may be made, like in gender, to the race of an individual or a group based on prior known stereotypes. For example, race-occupation combinations such as basketball or golf players usually receive race assumptions. Without any information on the individual's race, people usually assume a basketball player is black, and a golf player is white. This is based upon stereotypes because each sport tends to be dominated by a single race. In reality, there are other races within each sport.

==== Complexity ====
Complexity refers to the interconnectivity and interdependence of multiple parts in a system. When conducting research, complexity is a component that scholars have to keep in mind. The results of a deliberately controlled environment are unexpected because of the non-linear interaction and interdependencies within different groups and categories.

In a sociological aspect, the VUCA framework is utilized in research to understand social perception in the real world and how that plays into social categorization and stereotypes. Galen V. Bodenhausen and Destiny Peery's article, Social Categorization and Stereotyping In vivo: The VUCA Challenge, focused on researching how social categories impacted the process of social cognition and perception. The strategy used to conduct the research is to manipulate or isolate a single identity of a target while keeping all other identities constant. This method clearly shows how a specific identity in a social category can change one's perception of other identities, thus creating stereotypes.

There are problems with categorizing an individual's social identity due to the complexity of an individual's background. This research fails to address the complexity of the real world and the results from this highlighted an even greater picture of social categorization and stereotyping. Complexity adds many layers of different components to an individual's identity and creates challenges for sociologists trying to examine social categories. In the real world, people are far more complex than a modified social environment. Individuals identify with more than one social category, which opens the door to a more profound discovery about stereotyping. Results from research conducted by Bodenhausen reveal that specific identities are more dominant than others. Perceivers who recognize these distinct identities latch on to them and associate their preconceived notion of such identity and make initial assumptions about the individuals and hence stereotypes are created.

Conversely, perceivers who share some identities with the target tend to be more open-minded. They consider multiple social identities simultaneously, a phenomenon known as cross-categorization effects. Some social categories are nested within larger categorical structures, making subcategories more salient to perceivers. Cross-categorization can trigger both positive and negative effects. On the positive side, perceivers become more open-minded and motivated to delve deeper into their understanding of the target, moving beyond dominant social categories. However, cross-categorization can also result in social invisibility, where some cross-over identities diminish the visibility of others, leading to "intersectional invisibility" where neither social identity stands out distinctly and is overlooked.

==== Ambiguity ====
Ambiguity refers to when the general meaning of something is unclear even when an appropriate amount of information is provided. Many get confused about the meaning of ambiguity. It is similar to the idea of uncertainty, but they have different factors. Uncertainty is when relevant information is unavailable and unknown, and ambiguity where relevant information is available but the overall meaning is still unknown. Both uncertainty and ambiguity exist in our culture today. Sociologists use ambiguity to determine how and why an answer has been developed. Sociologists focus on details such as if there was enough information present and if the subject had the full knowledge necessary to make a decision. and why did he/she come to their specific answer.

Ambiguity is considered one of the leading causes of conflict within organizations.

Ambiguity often prompts individuals to make assumptions, including those related to race, gender, sexual orientation, and even class stereotypes. When people possess some information but lack a complete answer, they tend to generate their own conclusions based on the available relevant information. For instance, as Bodenhausen notes, we may occasionally encounter individuals who possess a degree of androgyny, making it challenging to determine their gender. In such cases, brief exposure might lead to misclassifications based on gender-atypical features, such as very long hair on a man or very short hair on a woman. Ambiguity can result in premature categorizations, potentially leading to inaccurate conclusions due to the absence of crucial details.

Sociologists suggest that ambiguity can fuel racial stereotypes and discrimination. In a South African study using white participants, people were shown images of racially mixed faces and asked to categorize them as European or African. Since all the participants were white, they struggled to classify these mixed-race faces as European and instead labeled them as African. This difficulty arose due to the ambiguity present in the images. The only information available to the participants was the subjects' skin tone and facial features. Despite having this information, the participants still could not confidently determine the ethnicity because the individuals did not precisely resemble their own racial group.

== Business applications ==
Key aspects of business operations and managerial capabilities adopted for conducting business in a VUCA world include adaptability, resilience, vision, and the ability to make and stand by a decision. The company AstraZeneca's work to "optimise business operations in a VUCA world" won them a Chartered Institute of Procurement & Supply (CIPS) award in 2021 for the "best response to supply chain resilience in a crisis" (i.e. the global COVID-19 pandemic).

== Alternative approaches ==
Bill George, a professor of management practice at Harvard Business School, argues that VUCA calls for a leadership response which he calls VUCA 2.0: Vision, understanding, courage and adaptability. George's response seems a minor adaptation of Bob Johansen's VUCA prime: Vision, understanding, clarity and agility.

Jamais Cascio suggested the BANI framework to highlight the environment as Brittle, Anxious, Nonlinear, and Incomprehensible.

Ulrich Lichtenthaler developed the PUMO framework, which describes the world as increasingly Polarized, Unthinkable, Metamorphic, and Overheated.

== See also ==
- Antifragile (disambiguation)
- Cynefin framework
- Fear, uncertainty, and doubt (FUD)
- Global Simplicity Index
- Goldilocks process
- Innovation butterfly
- Software bug
