= International School of Management, Germany =

German business school based in Dortmund

International School of Management
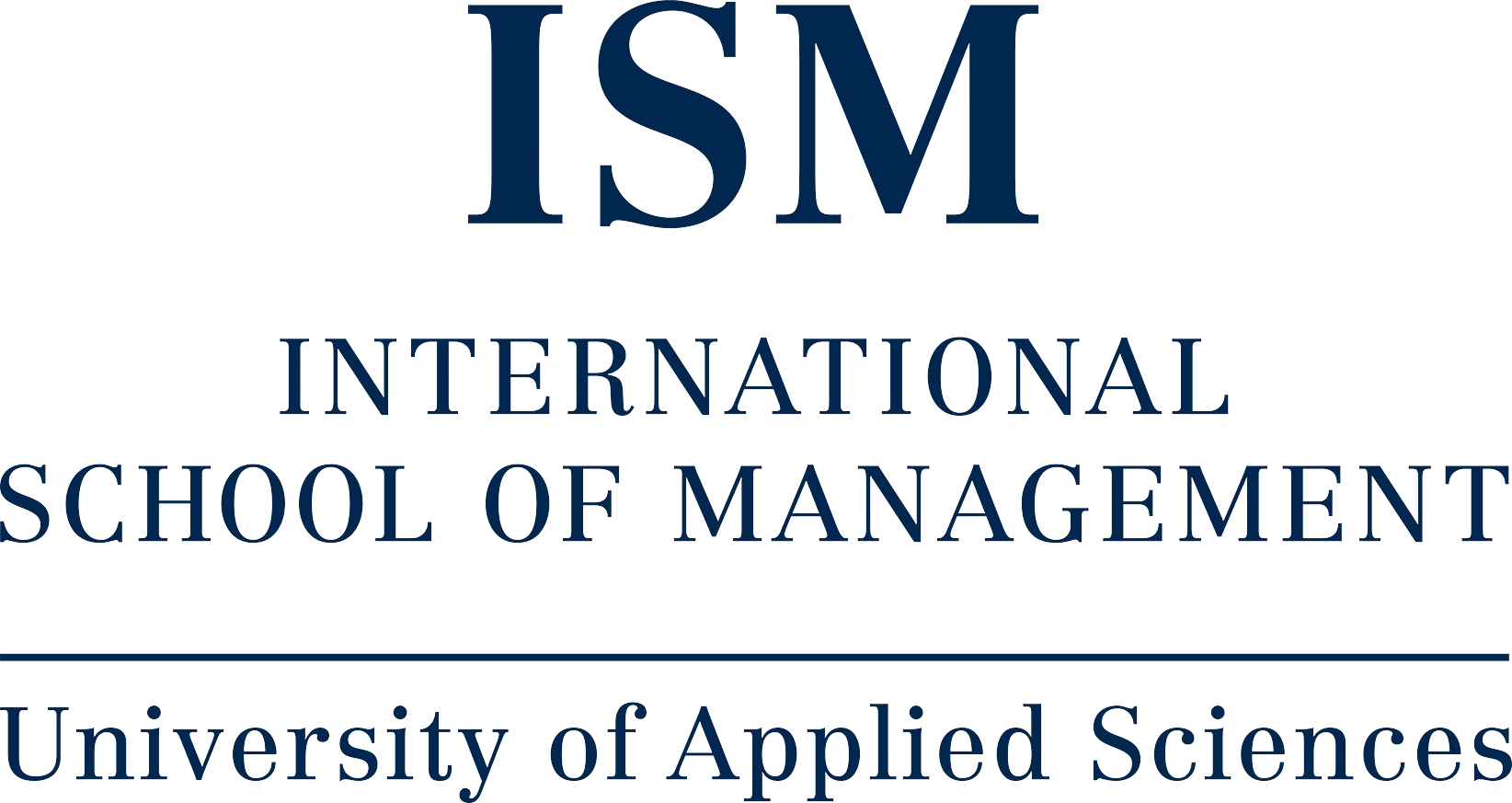
- Motto: International. Individual. Inspiring.
- Type: Private business school
- Established: 1990
- President: Prof. Dr. Ingo Böckenholt
- Students: Over 3200
- Location: Technologie-Park, Otto-Hahn-Strasse 19, 44227 Dortmund, Germany
- Campus: Dortmund Frankfurt am Main Munich Hamburg Cologne Stuttgart Berlin
- Website: http://www.ism.de

International School of Management GmbH (ISM) is a German business school headquartered in Dortmund. It is a private university with state recognition.

== Overview ==
The International School of Management (ISM) is a private, state-recognized University of Applied Sciences that has been offering career focused management education programs with an international orientation.

ISM has seven campuses in Dortmund, Frankfurt am Main (2007), Munich (2009), Hamburg (2010), Cologne (2014), Stuttgart (2016) and Berlin (2019).

== History ==
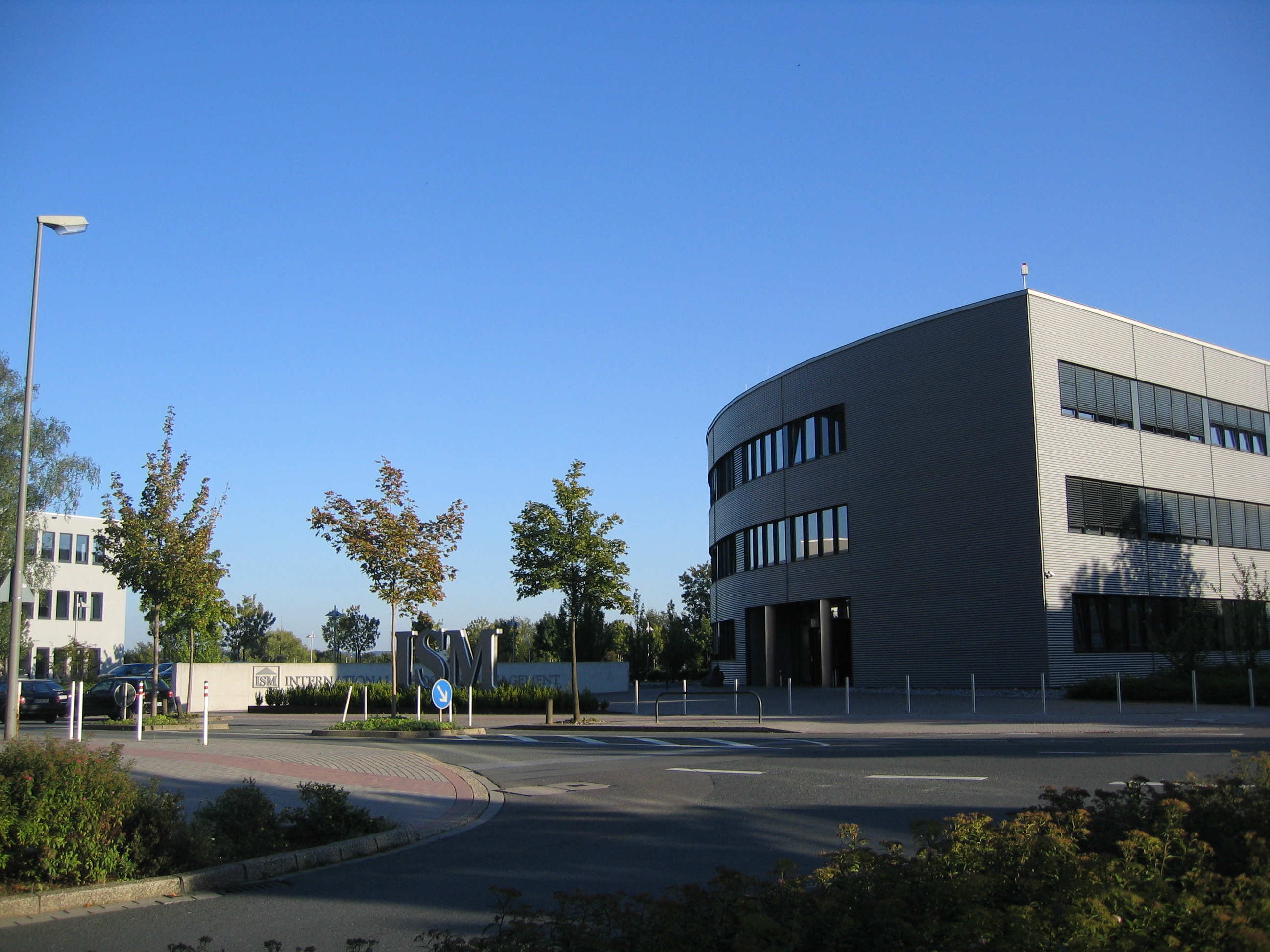
Dortmund campus.

Originally founded in 1990 as IDB-Wirtschaftsakademie in Dortmund by Klaus Evard, it was renamed the International School of Management (ISM) in 1992. In 1994 it was recognized as a private university of applied sciences for originally five years and received an extension. The company shares were taken over in 1998 by ESO Education Group.

In 2006, in accordance with the Bologna Process, ISM switched the Diploma courses to Bachelor and Master courses.

In 2010, Bert Rürup became president of ISM and moved to the board of trustees in 2013. He was succeeded by the previous vice president, Ingo Böckenholt. The managing directors are Silvia Semidei (who is also managing director of the parent organization ESO) and Ingo Böckenholt. In 2025, there was a change in the executive committee and management. In addition to Silvia Semidei, Prof. Dr. Audrey Mehn, Daisuke Motoki, and Karsten Gardy have been on the management board since then.

== Accreditation ==
ISM is recognized by the Ministry of Science of North Rhine-Westphalia, giving degrees that it issues equal status to those obtained at state universities.

In June 2004, ISM gained accreditation from the German Council of Science and Humanities for a period of ten years; this was renewed for a further 10 years in 2015.

The university first received accreditation from the FIBAA for its MBA program in 2003. Since then all ISM study programs have received FIBBA accreditation.

Since 2024 ISM is also accredited by AACSB.

== Ranking ==
In the 2023 CHE University Ranking, ISM ranked highest in the fields for Support at the beginning of the studies, graduation in due course and work experience.

In the 2020 U-Multirank ranking, ISM achieved a global Top 25 score in the categories, Contact to work environment and Student mobility.

In the 2019 Wirtschaftswoche Ranking, for Business administration, ISM came 4th in private universities and 14th overall.

== Partnerships ==
As of 3 September 2019, ISM is partnered with 188 universities across 43 countries.

== Notable people ==
=== Academic staff ===
- Ulrich Lichtenthaler
- Bert Rürup
- Hermann Schubert
