= International School of Management =

International School of Management may refer to:

- ISM University of Management and Economics, an institution in Lithuania
- International School of Management (Paris), an American graduate business school in Paris with a focus on international business
- International School of Management, Germany, a reputed business school in Germany.
