= EBS Symposium =

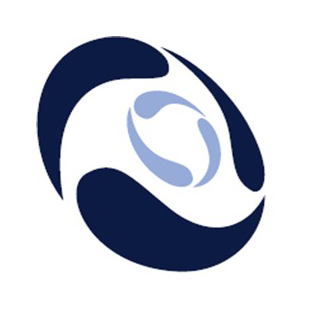
- Contact, Congress, Career
- Formation: 1989
- Type: Student Organization
- Members of the Board: Anna Walker; Philip Harms; Tita Engelschalk; Tom Schulz; Silja-Hinrike Bauwe
- Volunteers: 150-200
- Website: www.ebs-symposium.de

The EBS Symposium is the biggest collegiate economic congress in Europe organized solely by students with over 1000 participants each year. The EBS Symposium takes place annually in September on the campus of the EBS Universität für Wirtschaft und Recht in Oestrich-Winkel. For the first time in the history of the Event, the 34. Symposium, took place at the Wiesbaden Kurhaus, including prominent guests such as Volker Wissing.

One of the main goals of the EBS Symposium is to generate open conservation to discuss current economic issues between students, young professionals, and well-known representatives from business and politics. At the recruiting fair, various companies have the opportunity to introduce themselves and to pass on information about their company to participants and potential applicants. The topical speeches, panel discussions, and workshops on current economic and socially relevant topics offer space for interaction and communication among the participants and promote the establishment of contacts.

Every year many speakers are invited to join the EBS Symposium to contribute their experience and knowledge regarding the current topic through presentations or keynote speeches. The EBS Symposium has previously welcomed renowned speakers such as Jonas Deichmann (author and extreme athlete), Alexander Dibelius (CEO Germany, Austria, Eastern Europe, Goldman Sachs) and Matthias Buck (COO Germany from the Deutsche Bank AG).

The conference has been referred to as “one of Europe's largest and most prestigious student-run business conferences”.

== Career Opportunities ==
=== Career Fair ===
The career fair is often considered to be one of the most important part of the EBS Symposium. The Career Fair offers sought-after networking opportunities, by facilitating conversations with representatives from some of the largest companies worldwide. The list of recruiting partners included Goldman Sachs, McKinsey, Boston Consulting Group, BNP Paribas, P&C, Futury, EW Group, Horvarth & Partners, Accenture and many others.

=== Workshops and Interviews ===
Besides speeches, the EBS Symposium offers interactive panels, workshops, and interviews with potential employers. Companies have the chance to attract and win future applicants, by way of informative booths at the Recruiting Fair. Participants, often arriving from universities across the globe, ask questions to employees and experts about work with regards to individual areas of interest such as consulting or financial advisory. Furthermore, at the recruiting fair, the exhibitors have the chance to introduce the structure and culture of the company to interested students.

=== Innovation Fair ===
At the innovation Fair, participants of the EBS Symposium take part in innovative works and ideas as well as enter into a dialogue with the presenting company. The fair offers the companies the opportunity to exhibit their products, conduct market research, and find common grounds with other exhibitors. The spectrum ranges from companies in the automotive industry to manufacturers of TVs.

=== Start Up Pitches ===
Although the Symposium is a more traditional event, it has recognized a need for ‘adapting to change’. Entrepreneurship plays a significant role ate EBS University and should therefore also have its place at the Symposium. For this reason, the ‘Start-up Pitch Battle’ was introduced in 2021. The ‘Start-up Pitch Battle' gives 8 start-ups from different sectors a stage to pitch their business ideas to a jury and audience. They have 5 minutes to convince the jury, which consists of renowned Start Up founders and business angels, of their idea and get the chance to win the prize money and most important, receive constructive feedback from experienced founders.

== Former Speakers ==
Speakers and Guests at the EBS Symposium have included:

- Alexander Dibelius (CEO Germany, Austria, Eastern Europe, Goldman Sachs)
- Ann-Kristin Achleitner (German economist, professor at Technical University of Munich)
- Prof. Dr. Burkhard Schwenker (Chairman of the Supervisory Board, Roland Berger Strategy Consultants)
- Christian Lindner (leader of the FDP of Germany)
- Dietmar Hopp (Co-Founder, SAP AG)
- Eckhard Cordes (chairman of the executive board, Metro Group)
- Frank Mattern (Managing Director Germany, McKinsey & Company)
- Franz Fehrenbach (chairman of the supervisory board Robert Bosch GmbH)
- Friedrich Joussen (executive chairman of TUI Group)
- Gerhard Cromme (former Chairman of the supervisory board, Siemens AG)
- Gerhard Schröder (former Chancellor of Germany)
- Götz Werner (Founder, dm-drogerie markt GmbH & Co. KG)
- Hans-Paul Bürkner (President and CEO, Boston Consulting Group)
- Dr. Ing. E.h. Hartmut Mehdorn (CEO Air Berlin PLC & Co. Luftverkehrs KG)
- Helmut Kohl (former Chancellor of Germany)
- Helmut Olivier (Former CEO of Lehman Brothers Germany)
- Herbert Hainer (chairman of the executive board, Adidas AG)
- Horst Köhler (former Federal President of Germany)
- Jean-Claude Trichet (former President of the European Central Bank)
- Rt Hon Sir John Major (former Prime Minister of the United Kingdom)
- José Manuel Barroso (Prime Minister of Portugal & non-executive Chairman of Goldman Sachs International)
- Jürgen Schrempp (former Chairman of the executive board, DaimlerChrysler AG)
- Klaus Kleinfeld (CEO Alcoa Inc.; former chairman of the executive board, Siemens AG)
- Klaus Zumwinkel (former Chairman of the executive board, Deutsche Post AG)
- Manfred Maus (Founder of OBI GmbH & Co. Deutschland KG)
- Martin Blessing (Co-president Global Wealth Management at UBS Group AG)
- Matthias Buck (COO Germany, Deutsche Bank AG)
- Michael Dell (CEO and Founder, Dell Inc.)
- Peter Terium (former CEO of RWE)
- Thomas Enders (CEO Airbus S. A. S.)
- Dr. Thomas Fritz (Director of Recruiting, McKinsey & Company)
- Dr. Ulrich Bez (CEO, Aston Martin Ltd.)
- Wolfgang Reitzle (chairman of the executive board, Linde AG)

== Organization ==
A distinguishing element of the EBS Symposium is the fact that the entirety of the event is planned, organized and assembled by students enrolled in their first year of the bachelor program at the EBS Universität für Wirtschaft und Recht, of whom over 50 usually participated in the organisation of the event.

Students volunteering for the EBS Symposium, may assume various positions (member, head, chair) in a variety of departments. The departments assembling the EBS Symposium are participant relations, corporate relations, event, speaker relations, marketing & IT, mobility, finance & legal, and innovation fair. The students are supported by former chairmen and chairwomen, as well as EBS alumni and representatives of partner companies.

== History ==
Following the reunification of Germany in 1989, three EBS students came together and initiated the first rendition of the EBS Symposium under the name of “Pro 90”. As the country and world around them seemed to change completely, the trio felt a need for conversations and exchanges. Thus the conference was brought to life with the idea and goal of convergence and dialogue between students from different fields of studies and representatives from politics, science, and economics. The first EBS Symposium held the theme: “Made in Germany – a term to be redefined” and greatly resonated with students and participants alike. Following this initial success, the students' worked hard to establish their idea as an annual event at the EBS - with great success! The conference continued to take on different topics and themes over the next decades. Organized by students from the first and second semester, the event flourishes annually with new ideas and fresh concepts. The Students are supported by the “Wirtschaftsrat”, consisting of former EBS Symposium chairmen and chairwomen, as well as EBS alumni and representatives of renowned companies. In 1992, students focused the annual event onto financial issues, renaming the conference “Bankenforum”. The 19th Symposium took place in 2008, under the patronage of Thomas Enders, with about 1,500 participants, including 200 representatives of several companies. Among the 55 speakers Jean-Claude Trichet, John Major and Jochen Zeitz captivated the audiences with inspiring keynote speeches. The 20th Symposium took place in September 2009 with Dieter Zetsche serving as its patron. Zetsche was succeeded in 2010 by Axel Weber the former President of the German Federal Bank as patron.[5] The theme “Dawn of Demography – Import Growth or Export Knowledge?” guided the 22nd EBS Symposium in 201 under the patronage of Philipp Rösler, the Vice-Chancellor of Germany. The EBS Symposium continued to take place annually on the EBS campus in Oestrich-Winkel, growing in size and renownedness, attracting more than 1000 participants and 50 corporate partners annually. In 2020 the global COVID19 pandemic forced students to cancel the traditional event. However, students were not discouraged and instead initiated a digital EBS Symposium bracing the challenge with the theme: ‘Stand Up to Stand Out - Expand your Horizons’. Following a tumultuous time the EBS Symposium was back in its physical form in 2021 for the 32. time. The conference was offered in an inclusive hybrid mode, tackling the theme of ‘Adapting to Change - The Beginning of a New Era’. Addressing the new societal shifts and encouraging thought provoking interactions the conference celebrated change and unity. Pledging climate neutrality and incorporating a start-up pitch battle the 32. EBS Symposium set out to start the New Era with new traditions. The 33rd EBS Symposium is set to take place in Oestrich-Winkel from September 15–17, offering exciting speeches, panels and workshops alongside the traditional recruiting and innovation fairs, startup pitches and unprecedented networking opportunities.

== See also ==
- EBS University of Business and Law
- Frankfurt am Main
- Oestrich-Winkel
