= EBS Universität für Wirtschaft und Recht =

Private university focused on business and law

Coordinates: 50°00′45″N 8°03′00″E

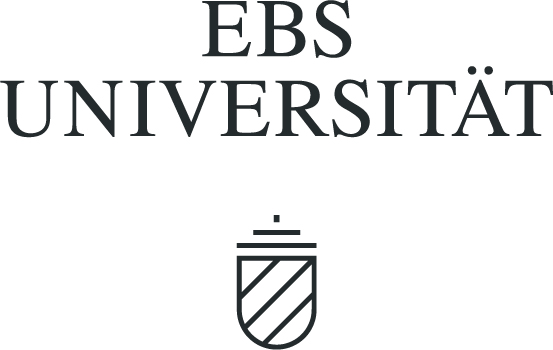
- Former name: European Business School
- Motto: Leadership Personalities. Made by EBS.
- Type: Private research university
- Established: 1971
- Accreditation: AACSB; FIBAA; German Council of Science and Humanities
- Affiliations: Erasmus+ Law Schools Global League
- President: Günther H. Oettinger
- Rector: Henning Werner
- Dean: Raša Karapandža (Business School), Ulrich Segna (Law School)
- Faculty: ~70 faculty members
- Students: 2,200 (including doctoral students)
- Location: Wiesbaden, Oestrich-Winkel, Hessen, Germany
- Language: English, German
- Website: www.ebs.edu/en

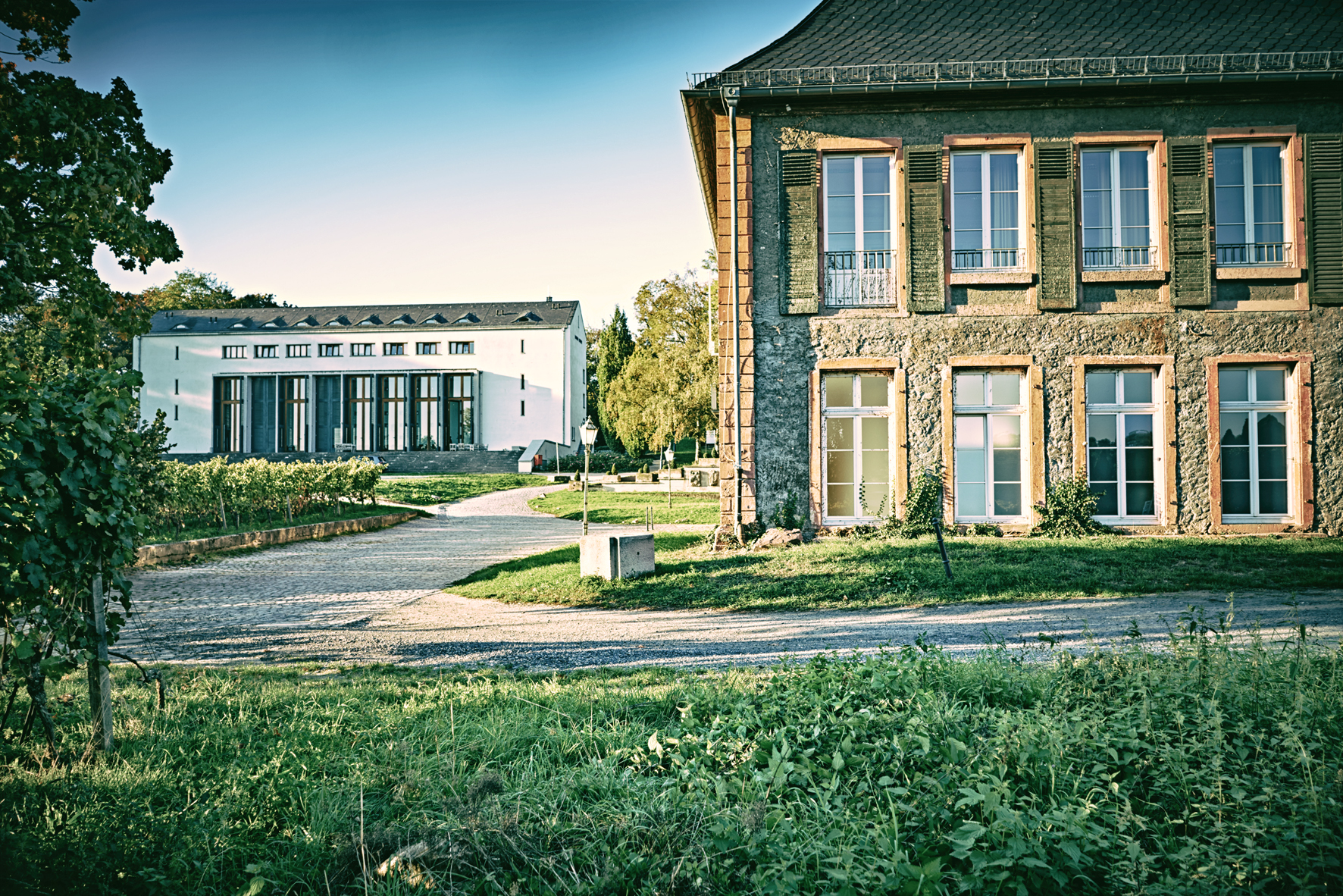
View of EBS University of Business and Law

EBS Universität für Wirtschaft und Recht (literally "university for business and law"), more commonly referred to as EBS Universität or simply EBS, is a state-recognized private research university specializing in the disciplines of business and law. The university is located in Oestrich-Winkel, Germany. EBS is considered to be one of the most prestigious institutions for law and business studies in the German-speaking world, being particularly renowned in the finance and consulting industry.

The university was founded in 1971 as European Business School, thereby making it the oldest private business school in Germany, and its activities focus on three core areas: undergraduate degree programs, postgraduate degree programs, and executive education. With the foundation of its law faculty in 2010, the former European Business School was awarded full university status in 2011, forming the EBS Universität für Wirtschaft und Recht.

EBS is known as one of the most thriving universities for entrepreneurs in Germany. Start-ups of EBS Alumni include Vapiano, Lieferando, Foodspring. Notable alumni are the CEO of Goldman Sachs for Germany, Austria and Switzerland (Dr. Wolfgang Fink), SVP and Chief Business Officer at Google (Philipp Schindler), former CEO of Puma (Jochen Zeitz), or former CEO of Deutsche Telekom AG (Kai-Uwe Ricke).

Among the university's corporate partners, one can find McKinsey, Bertelsmann, Clifford Chance, Mercedes-Benz, or UBS. Academic partnerships include UC Berkeley, Bocconi University, CEIBS, Sciences Po, National University of Singapore, and McGill University.

Its current president is Günther Oettinger, former EU Commissioner and former Minister-president of the state of Baden-Württemberg.

== History ==
EBS was founded in Offenbach am Main as a University of Applied Sciences by Klaus Evard in 1971. The young institution was named the European Business School. The original concept provided for a European-style leadership training program with three locations in France, England, and Germany. To this day, the EBS study program is characterized by several practical periods of study abroad, integrated semesters abroad, and a school-based structure. In 1980 the School moved to Schloss Reichartshausen in Oestrich-Winkel in the Rheingau. In 1985 a second university building (the "Burg") was added in Oestrich-Winkel.

In 1989 it was awarded higher education status, 1992 it was recognized as a scientific university by the Hessian Minister of Science. This step was followed by the separation of EBS Schloss Reichartshausen from the international network of European Business Schools, which had developed into a network in the 1980s. Since then, EBS has been cooperating with independent universities worldwide. In 1993 it was awarded the right to confer doctoral degrees and in 1998 the right to confer post-doctoral (professorial) qualifications.

On 16 June 2010, the EBS Law School was founded as a second faculty alongside the EBS Business School, and "Universität in Gründung" (University under formation) status was gained. The EBS Law School is located in Wiesbaden and is the official seat of EBS Universität. Since September 2011 the EBS Universität für Wirtschaft und Recht has the official status of a university.

New EBS students caught attention in September 2010 as they over-consumed alcohol in September 2010 in close proximity to the university as part of a freshman ritual.

The founding of the EBS Law School should initially be funded by the state of Hesse and the city of Wiesbaden with 25 million Euros, but actually required 50 million Euros. At the end of April the Hessian Ministry for Science announced that they would examine the reports on the expenditure of funds and to freeze all aid money, leading to a repayment of around 2% of that amount, which were used for other causes than for the startup of the law school. Inquiries by state prosecutors because of a potential fraud at the expense of the State of Hesse led to a state prosecutor raid of the offices and flats of leading EBS management staff on April 9, 2014. Both related preliminary proceedings against all parties for an administrative offence pursuant to Section 170 (2) of the Code of Criminal Procedure have been discontinued because the public prosecutor's office in Frankfurt has not established sufficient suspicion.

In December 2018 the third EBS Executive School faculty was founded.

== Campus ==
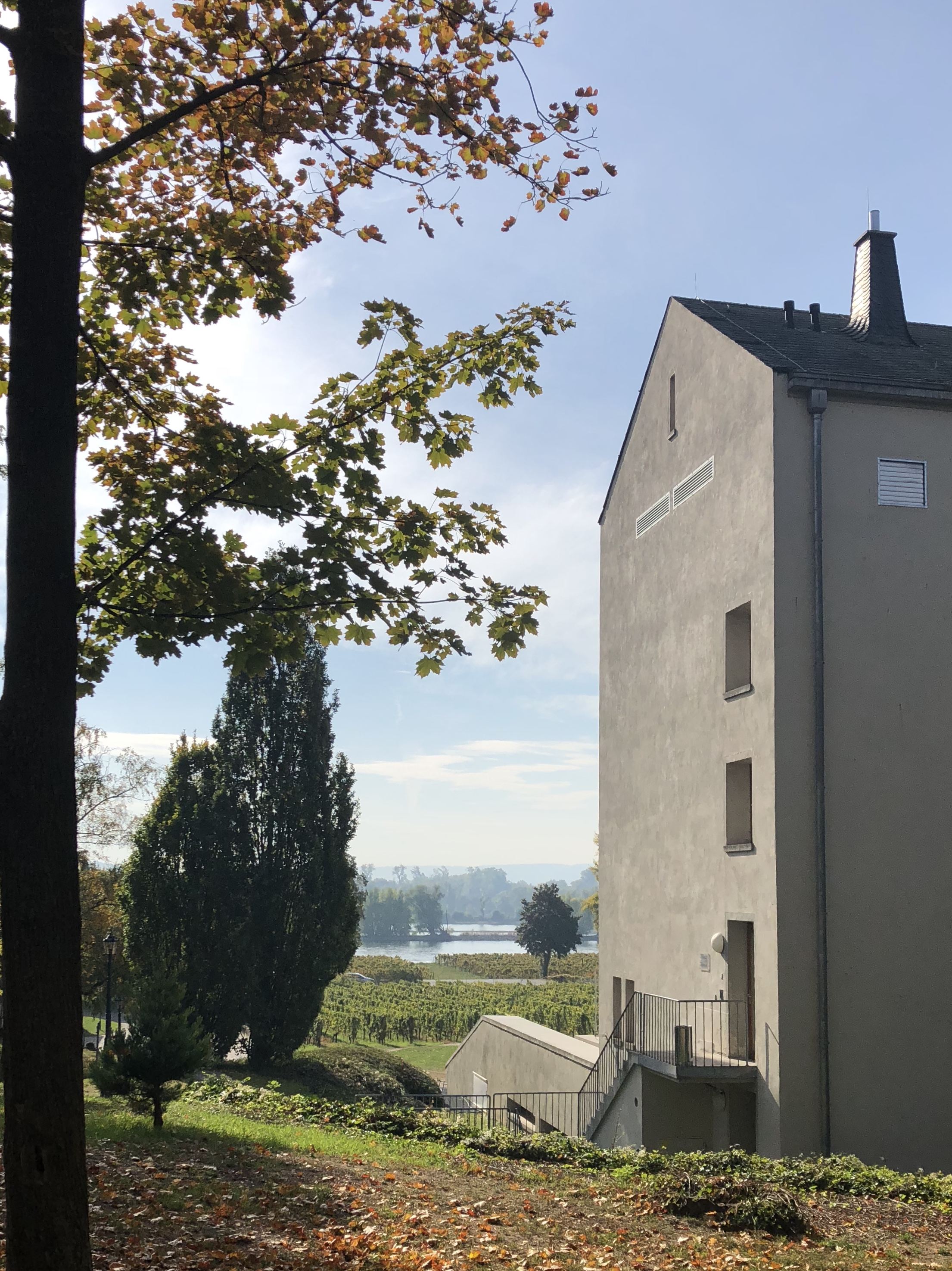
Campus of EBS Business School

The EBS maintains a total of three locations for teaching, research, and administrative purposes. The two largest campuses are located in Wiesbaden and Oestrich-Winkel. The newer Wiesbaden campus houses the EBS Law School, while Reichartshausen Castle at the larger and older Oestrich-Winkel campus houses the EBS Business School.

== Organization and administration ==
Shareholders of the EBS Universität für Wirtschaft und Recht gGmbH are SRH Higher Education GmbH, a wholly owned subsidiary of the non-profit foundation SRH, and the alumni association EBS Alumni e.V.

The president of the university is former EU Commissioner Günther Oettinger, who together with Henning Werner (Rector) and Dorothée Hofer (Managing Director) leads the university.

== Academic profile ==
=== General Information ===
The EBS Universität offers degree programs at the undergraduate and graduate levels. Both faculties also offer doctoral programs and award habilitations.

=== Business School ===
Study programs of the EBS Business School include:

- Bachelor of Science (BSc) in Business Studies (6 possible specialisations)
- Bachelor of Arts in Law, Politics and Economics (2 possible specialisations)
- specialized Master of Science (MSc) programs, including Master in Finance, Business Analytics, Marketing, Real Estate, and other areas.
- as well as a full-time Master of Business Administration (MBA) program.

At EBS Universität, a personal coach is available to all students and doctoral candidates to support them throughout their studies. The University also offers a range of executive education programs for specialists and managers. EBS is a member of the academic section of the UN Global Compact, a global initiative to promote corporate citizenship. In addition to business-related research, EBS has a chair of Philosophy of Science and an Institute for Business Ethics.

=== Executive School ===
Since December 2018, the EBS Executive School has been offering part-time continuing education programs and certificate programs.

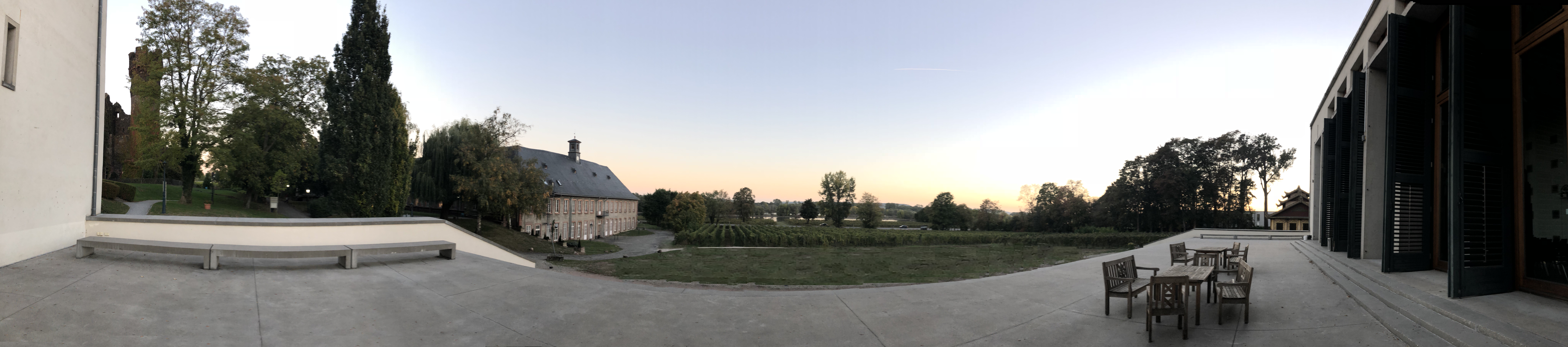
EBS Campus Schloss

== Law School ==
=== Education ===
The EBS Law School offers a law programme (mostly held in german) leading to the German State Examination (Erste Juristische Prüfung) in jurisprudence.

The law programme at EBS Law School is structured into a total of eight semesters and includes a foundation period, a main study period, a semester abroad and a specialisation period. After three years law students receive a Bachelor of Laws (LL.B.). At the end students must take the german bar examination (German State Examination). The Law School's students are among the best in Germany, with a rate of over 60% of students passing the bar examination with distinction (Prädikatsexamen). Since 2014, four of the best graduates of the state Hesse have been from EBS University.

As of September 2023, the law school employs 18 professors and lecturers. Additionally, 29 external lecturers teach at the law school, among them professors from some of the nations best ranked universities, judges, researchers and lawyers from some of the countries leading law firms.

=== Reputation ===
According to several rankings, it’s considered one of the best in Germany. In 2023, they received the 5th place of the CHE Ranking which focusses on the academic quality, and third based on the LTO Ranking which primarily focuses on student satisfaction.

With around 60% reaching at least a “Prädikatsexamen” in the first state exam, the Law School ranks second in Germany after the Bucerius Law School.

In 2019, the law school ranked 10th by reputation in Germany according to ranking by WirtschaftsWoche.

=== Partnerships and Cooperations ===
The law schools partner network includes some of the most reputable national and international law firms, including Clifford Chance, Hengeler Mueller, Gleiss Lutz, Linklaters and Skadden.

During the third year of law school, students must spend a semester abroad. The Law School has a network of partner universities, including Bocconi University, Paris Dauphine University and University of Amsterdam.

=== Student initiatives ===
In 2022, the Diversity and Refugee Law Clinic was founded.

During their first year of studies, students are members of two “Ressorts”, which do charitable work, visit local companies and institutions, organise Moot Courts, and contribute to university life in a variety of other ways. Each Ressort focusses on specific subjects, and are often different from the Ressorts at the Business faculty.

Every year, first year students organise the EBS law congress, which often features a list of well-known speakers including politicians, judges, professors and entrepreneurs. Corporate partners and guest include leading law firms, but also companies in the legal, recruiting and media space. The event is the biggest student organised law congress in Germany.

In July 2022, the BRYTER Center for Digitalization & Law was opened, which researches and teaches on topics of law and digitization.

== Student life ==
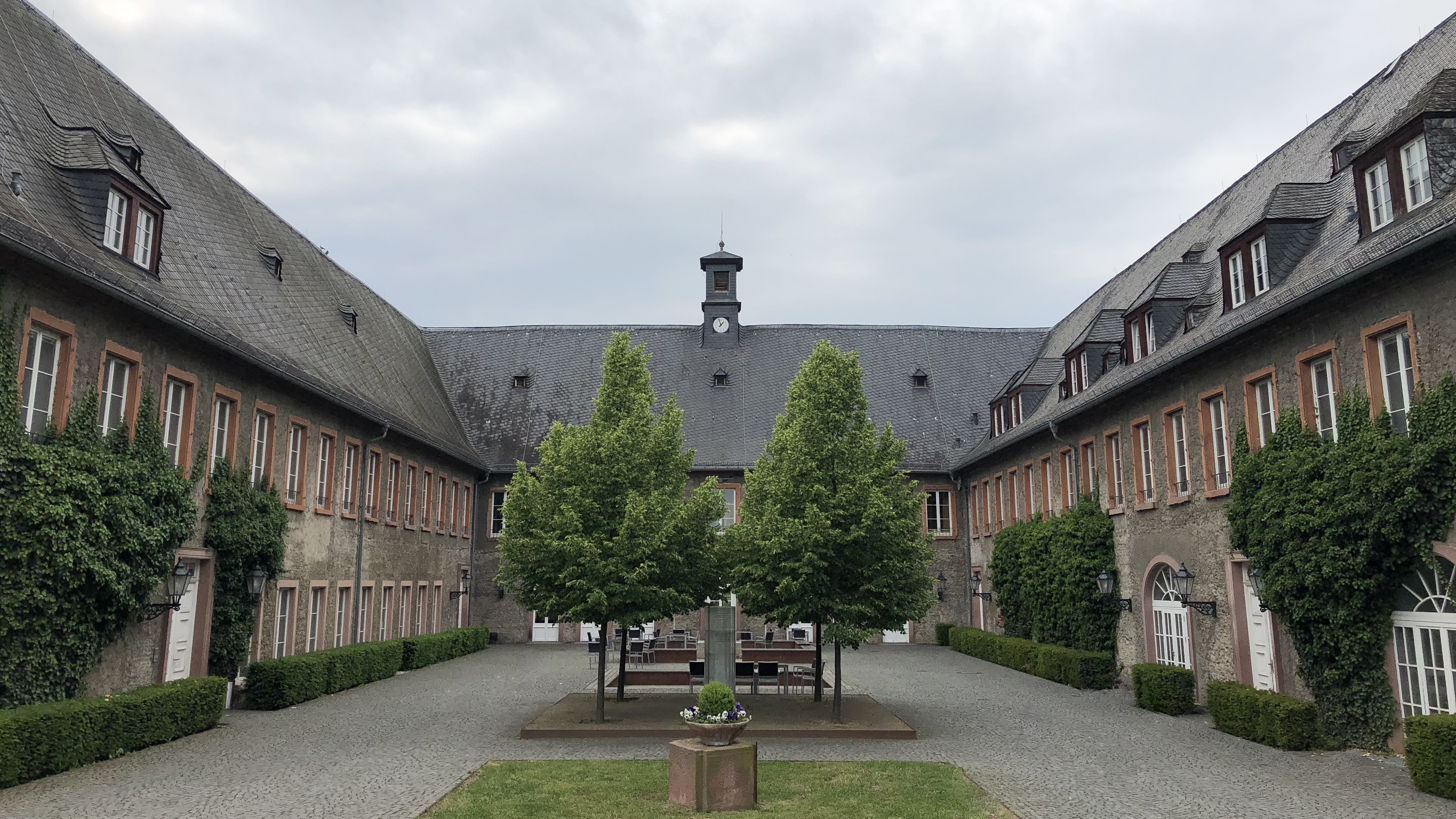
View into the inner courtyard of EBS Business School

Students work together in numerous student initiatives to address social issues, organize events and congresses, or consult small and mid-sized businesses. One notable event is the annual EBS Symposium, which brings together renowned personalities of business and politics with students and journalists to discuss current business issues. Other notable student organizations and initiatives include:

- James Consulting (student consultancy)
- EBS.Invest e.V. (finance society)
- IVV - "In Vino Veritas" (production of university wine)
- EBS Politics
- EBS Real Estate Congress
- EBS Law Congress

== Accreditations ==
- EBS Business School, business factulty of EBS Universität, is accredited by the Association to Advance Collegiate Schools of Business (AACSB)
- FIBAA: All programs are accredited by the Foundation for International Business Administration Accreditation (FIBAA)
- Since 2012 EBS holds the institutional accreditation by the German Council of Science and Humanities.
- EQUIS: The EBS was accredited by EQUIS from 2012 to 2016. The EBS did not fulfill the criteria for the reaccreditation of EQUIS in 2015 as ruled by the EFMD, but was granted the right to go through the reaccreditation process once again in 2016. In December 2016, EBS lost its EQUIS accreditation by failing to satisfy the requirements of the EFMD.

== Rankings ==
EBS University is part of various international rankings

- In 2023, EBS was ranked 2nd in Germany and 25th in the world in the influential Financial Times ranking for its Masters in Finance program.
- In 2023, EBS was ranked #58 in the world in the Financial Times ranking for its Masters in Management program.
- In 2023, EBS was ranked 7th in the WirtschaftsWoche ranking of the top 10 German universities in business administration.
- The EBS Law School also occupies the top group in several rankings: in the Centrum für Hochschulentwicklung ranking, they took the 2nd place in 2020 and 5th place in 2023, as well as the 3rd Place of the Legal Tribune Online ranking.
- In 2023, QS World University Rankings ranked EBS #401-450 worldwide in the subject "Business and Management Studies".
- In 2022, EBS was ranked #2 in Germany for its MBA in the Eduniversal Masters Rankings, and #1 in Financial Markets for its Master's in Finance.
- In 2019, QS World University Rankings ranked the Business School #56 worldwide for its Master in Management program.

== Presidents ==
- 1971–1994: Klaus Evard
- 1994–2000: Walter Leisler Kiep
- 2000–2009: Hans Tietmeyer
- 2009–2011: Christopher Jahns
- 2011–2013: Rolf Cremer
- 2013–2015: Rolf Wolff
- 2016–2020: Markus Ogorek
- 2021–today: Günther H. Oettinger

== Alumni ==
=== The alumni association ===
Founded in 1971, the EBS's Alumni Association is one of the oldest and largest networks of alumni in Germany, with over 3,400 members. In 2008 the EBS Alumni Association initiated the Alumni Alliance, a strategic cooperation between the Harvard Clubs of Germany, Stanford Alumni Rhein-Main Frankfurt, HSG Alumni St. Gallen Frankfurt, and ETH Alumni Zürich and Frankfurt.

=== List of notable alumni (selection) ===
- Cornelius Boersch, Business Angel and founder of Mountain Partners
- Prince Maximilian of Liechtenstein, CEO LGT Group
- Philipp Schindler, Senior Vice President and Chief Business Officer at Google
- Jochen Zeitz, CEO and chairman of the board of Harley-Davidson, former CEO of Puma
- Dr. Wolfgang Fink, CEO of Goldman Sachs for Germany, Austria and Switzerland
- Stefan Jekel, Head of International Listings at New York Stock Exchange
- Astrid Teckentrupp, Managing Director of Procter & Gamble for Germany, Austria and Switzerland
- Jürgen Steinemann, Chairman at Metro Group
- Mark Korzilius, founder of Vapiano
- Ralf-Otto Limbach, former Managing Director of Vaillant Group
- Rolf Hansen, Christian Magel and Thomas S. Enge, founders of Simyo GmbH
- Kai-Uwe Ricke, former CEO of Deutsche Telekom AG
- Martin Krebs, Managing Director of ING-DiBa
- Steffen Naumann, CFO at Zuellig Group Hong Kong, former CFO at Bertelsmann and Springer
- Jan-Henrik Lafrentz, CFO of MAN Truck & Bus AG
- Markus Schrick, CEO of Hyundai Motor Germany
- Yves Müller, CFO at Hugo Boss AG

== International network ==
The EBS maintains a global network of 270 partner universities. The university offers several double degree options, including Tongji University, EDHEC Business School, Brock University and Universidad Carlos III de Madrid.

== Filmography & books ==
- Gestatten: Elite – Auf den Spuren der Mächtigen von morgen. (Engl.: Meet the elite – On the trail of tomorrows powerful) Book, Hoffmann und Campe, Hamburg 2008, ISBN 978-3-455-50051-6
- "grow or go“. The Architects of the "global village“. Documentary, Germany 2003, 94 Min., Buch: Marc Bauder, Dörte Franke, Regie: Marc Bauder, Produktion: ZDF, Das kleine Fernsehspiel (Four absolvents are followed on their way to become consultants)
- „Von Anfang an Elite“ (Engl.: Elite from the beginning). Documentary, Deutschland 2008, 45 Min., Buch: Julia Friedrichs, Eva Müller, Produktion: WDR, Die Story
- „Die jungen Manager“ (Engl.: The young managers). Documentary about the expectations of the future managers, Germany, 5.06 Min., 25. März 2013
