= Ulrich Lichtenthaler =

German economist

Ulrich Lichtenthaler (born 1978) is a German economist and executive consultant who is the inventor of the PUMO framework as an extension and substitute of the VUCA world. He is Professor of Management and Entrepreneurship at the International School of Management in Cologne. He held the Chair of Management and Organization at the University of Mannheim until March 2015.

== Life ==
Ulrich Lichtenthaler studied European Economy at the Otto-Friedrich University in Bamberg and at the Universidad de Granada, graduating with a double degree as Dipl.-Kfm. and European Master of Business Sciences (E.M.B.Sc.). He went on to receive a doctorate at the WHU – Otto Beisheim School of Management under Prof. Holger Ernst at the chair for Technology and Innovation Management in 2006, writing a dissertation with the title Leveraging Knowledge Assets: Success Factors of External Technology Commercialization.

In late 2009, he received his Habilitation with a thesis by publication at the WHU before becoming a visiting professor at Technische Universität Berlin for a few months. Then, he followed a call by his alma mater in February 2010 and became professor of the newly created chair for Innovation and Organization at the WHU. Lichtenthaler then held the Chair of Management and Organization at the University of Mannheim from 2011 to 2015.

He joined the International School of Management as professor in 2018.

== Work ==
Lichtenthaler's research focuses on the PUMO framework and on the management of artificial intelligence and digital transformation as well as organization theory, innovation management and strategic management, primarily using quantitative, empirical methods. He published in some business journals, including the Academy of Management Journal, Organization Science and the Strategic Management Journal, and he is author of the book Integrated Intelligence. Moreover, he has developed several managerial tools, including the Green Grass Strategy and the PUMO framework, which describes the world as increasingly Polarized, Unthinkable, Metamorphic and Overheated, and which is an extension and substitute of the well-known VUCA and BANI frameworks.

Lichtenthaler's research publications earned him several awards in Germany. He received the "Best Paper Award in Innovation Management", awarded by WHU, and the "Nachwuchspreis des Verbands der Deutschen Hochschullehrer für Betriebswirtschaft", an award given to promising young academics in the field of business research, and the 2009 Handelsblatt ranking listed him first among German business and economic researchers under 40 and 17th in term of lifetime publications.

These achievements were primarily based on the publication record of Lichtenthaler. However, this publication record collapsed when a large number of Lichtenthalers' paper were retracted after severe irregularities were discovered through investigations by different research groups, several of the affected journals, as well as commissions of WHU and the University of Mannheim.

== Publications controversy ==
In 2012, a publications controversy (around a pattern of undeclared, multiple submissions resulting in parallel publication of similar papers, misrepresentation of the significance of statistical findings, and removal of variables in some of Lichtenthaler's papers despite that these variables were being reported as significant in his other papers on the same data) emerged that resulted in several of Lichtenthaler's publications being retracted. This included publications in the Journal of Management Studies, Academy of Management Journal, Entrepreneurship Theory & Practice, Strategic Organization, Research Policy, Strategic Management Journal, Journal of World Business, Organization Science, Journal of Business Venturing, Industrial and Corporate Change, Journal of Product Innovation Management. Journal of Engineering and Technology Management, and Technological Forecasting and Social Change. By 2014, 16 of Lichtenthaler's articles had been retracted. In addition, after the controversy erupted, Lichtenthaler withdrew three articles from the Journal of Product Innovation Management which had been accepted but not yet published.

Based on the publications controversy, the WHU and the University of Mannheim created commissions tasked with investigating academic fraud by Lichtenthaler in 2012. In September 2013, the WHU revoked his Habilitation teaching certificate because an "essential condition for the granting of the teaching certificate was not met". In October 2014, the University of Mannheim announced that Lichtenthaler would resign from his position in Mannheim in March 2015.
