= Philipp Schindler =

Google executive

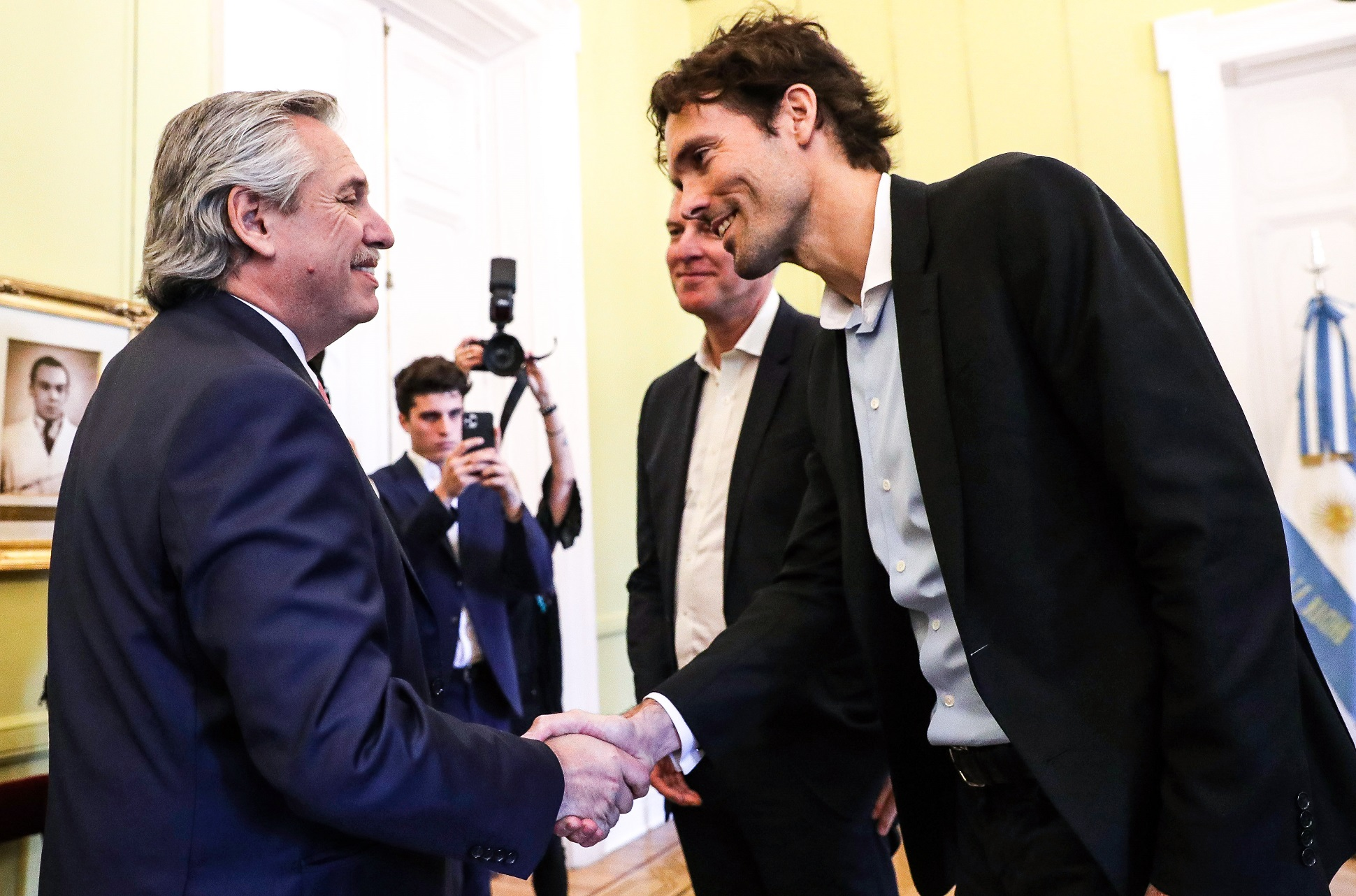
- Schindler (right) greeting Alberto Fernández (left), the President of Argentina, in 2019 in his role as Google's chief business officer
- Born: 1970 or 1971 (age 55–56); Düsseldorf, West Germany
- Education: European Business School
- Employer: Google
- Title: Senior vice president and chief business officer of Google
- Children: 3

Philipp Schindler is a German senior vice president and chief business officer for Google, overseeing sales activities for Google and YouTube, technical and consumer support, business development and partnerships, as well as country operations across the world.

== Early life and education ==
Schindler was raised in Gerresheim, Düsseldorf. He was "obsessed" with computers at a young age. Schindler's first computer was a Commodore 64, and he was writing code and building software programs by the age of 15.

Schindler earned a Diplom-Kaufmann degree from the European Business School. He is a scholar of the Studienstiftung (German Academic Scholarship Foundation).

== Career ==
Schindler began his career in Bertelsmann's talent development program in the mid 1990s, focusing on new media services in the global corporate strategy division. He was later the head of marketing at CompuServe, a subsidiary of AOL, in Germany. At the age of 28, he became the head of marketing and sales and a senior vice president for AOL Germany. Schindler was a member of AOL Germany's management board for six years. The Wall Street Journal said he "was responsible for one of the largest marketing and sales budgets in the country, constantly innovating" in the areas of brand and direct marketing, business intelligence, customer relationship management, data mining, and pricing. Schindler is credited for "[developing] a range of major sales partnerships and a number of internationally acknowledged marketing projects", including a campaign featuring Boris Becker, and has received multiple industry awards. He also worked at the AOL headquarters in the U.S., as an e-commerce and marketing specialist.

=== Google ===
Schindler joined Google in Hamburg in 2005, shortly after the company's initial public offering in 2004. He was the managing director for Google's advertising business in Germany, Austria, Switzerland, and the Nordics. Schindler has also been credited for working to address privacy concerns related to Street View during his tenure. Wirtschaftswoche ranked him second in a list of the 100 most important internet figures in Germany. Schindler became chief of Google Central and Northern Europe in 2009, overseeing operations in the Benelux countries, Denmark, Finland, Germany, Ireland, Norway, Sweden, Switzerland, and the United Kingdom. He was included in The Wall Street Journal's "Tech's Top 25" list in 2011.

In 2012, Schindler took a position based in the U.S., leading global sales and operations as a senior vice president. The position saw him "[run] the operations teams across all of Google's monetization products". Schindler was named chief business officer following Sundar Pichai's appointment as chief executive officer in 2015. Schindler "oversees global and regional sales activities for Google and YouTube, global technical and consumer support and operations, and partnership and business development teams across key product areas". In 2022, The Information said Schindler is "closer to the beating heart of Google's core money-making business than any other executive at the company". He has been involved in Google's return-to-office plans, acquisition strategy, and geopolitical decisions.

In his current role, Schindler leads sales for a $230-billion-a-year portfolio of Google services which generate 90 percent of Alphabet's revenues. He is credited with having "devised new ways to package the company's businesses together, working with customers on an expanding list of complex partnerships". Schindler manages a large number of employees: he oversaw 13,000–15,000 sales and operations employees globally as of 2016, and 29,000 employees as of 2022, which was approximately 17 percent of Google's total employee count and "the second-most of any business line other than cloud computing", according to The Wall Street Journal.

== Personal life ==
Schindler is married and has three children. He has been described as an outdoorsman who enjoys camping, hydrofoiling, and skiing.
