= Law Schools Global League =

- Abbreviation: LSGL
- Formation: June 21st, 2012
- Members: 32 universities
- Presidency: Soledad Atienza, Dean of IE Law School; James Speta, Professor at Northwestern Pritzker School of Law
- Website: lawschoolsgloballeague.com

The Law Schools Global League or LSGL was instituted in 2012 by a selected number of globally leading law schools.

It has the primary aim of globally promoting and fostering scholastic research on law and legal education as well as encouraging collaboration among its members in the debate on issues impacting global law or legal practice.

== Members ==
LSGL is composed of 32 research universities from 24 different countries and 5 continents, sharing a common vision and at the same time committed to education and research on global law and legal practice, namely:

- Católica Global School of Law
- China University of Political Science and Law
- EBS Universität für Wirtschaft und Recht
- FGV Direito Rio de Janeiro Law School
- FGV Direito São Paulo Law School
- Georgetown University
- Harry Radzyner Law School
- IE Law School
- Instituto Tecnológico Autónomo de México
- King's College London
- Koç Üniversitesi Law School
- Kyushu University
- National Research University Higher School of Economics (*membership currently suspended)
- NUI Galway
- National University of Singapore
- Northwestern University Pritzker School of Law
- O.P. Jindal Global University
- Queen's University Belfast School of Law
- Seoul National University
- Stockholm University Faculty of Law
- Strathmore University
- The Chinese University of Hong Kong
- The Jagiellonian University
- Tilburg University
- UCLA School of Law
- Universidad de los Andes
- Università degli Studi di Torino
- Universität Freiburg
- University of Cape Town
- University of Edinburgh
- University of Queensland
- University of Pretoria
- UNSW Faculty of Law and Justice
- Wuhan University Law School

== Objective ==
LSGL members share a commitment to foster the globalisation of law as well as the integration of global law into their research and teaching.
