= Ben Birdsall =

English writer and artist

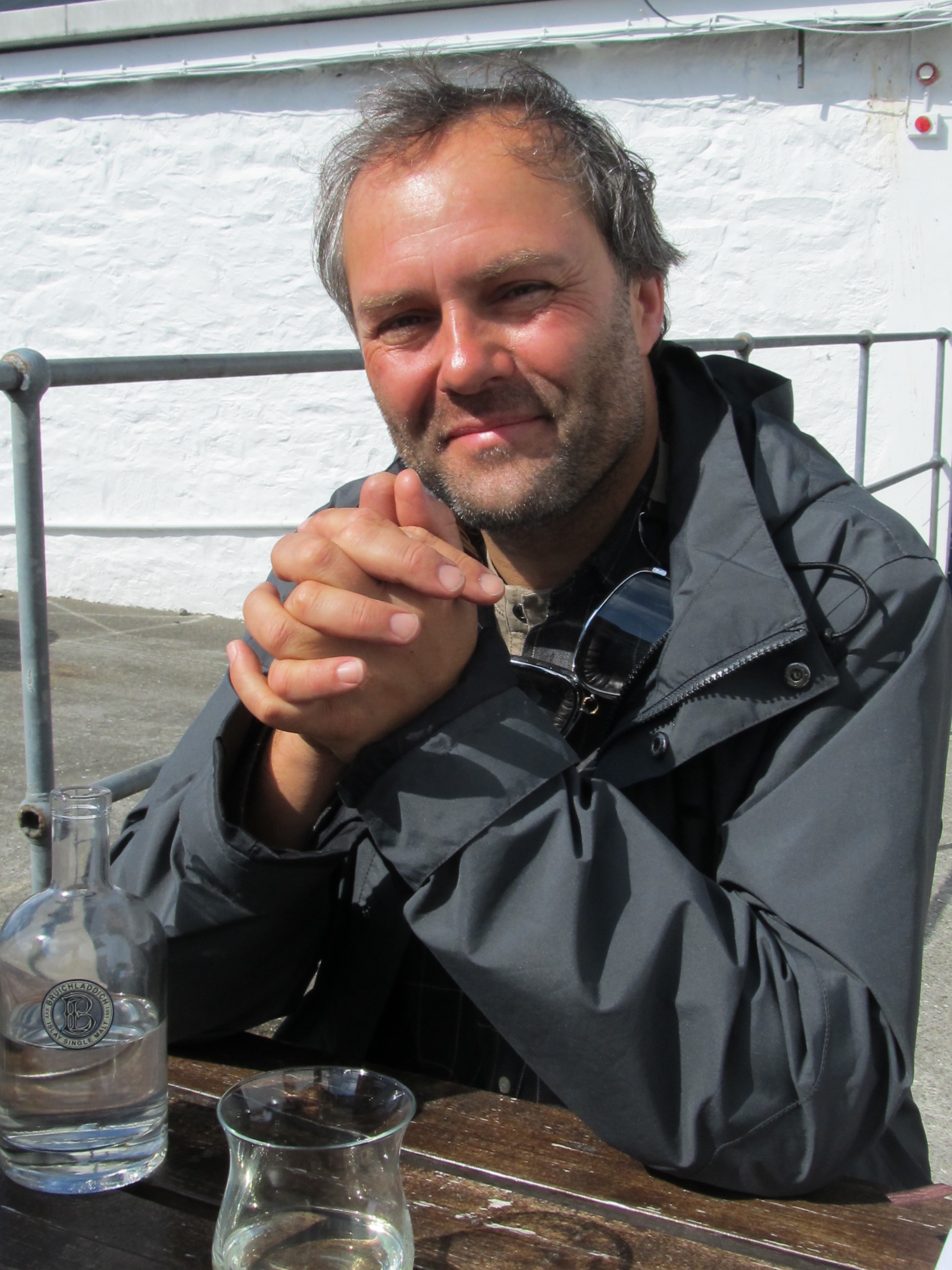
- Ben Birdsall in 2011
- Born: Benedick Stephen Birdsall; 1967 (age 58–59); Keighley, West Yorkshire
- Occupations: Writer, painter
- Notable work: Blue Charm, Tuscany by Vespa, Umbria by Vespa, Whisky Burn

Ben Birdsall (born 1967) is an English writer and artist. He is known mainly for his travelogue books “by Vespa”, published in Italy and the Netherlands.

== Life ==
Birdsall was born in West Yorkshire, England, and raised in Cross Hills. He was educated at Glusburn County Primary, South Craven Secondary, Sedbergh School and Durham University, where his studies in English literature left him with the intention of becoming a writer. Following a succession of jobs to gain materials for his stories, from road sweeper to bingo caller, he moved to Italy to study painting in Tuscany. He remained in Palaia twelve years, before moving to Winterthur, Switzerland in 2005.

== Writer ==
Reviewing Birdsall's play Staggart Lane at the Edinburgh Festival Fringe in 1987, Mario Relich wrote in The Scotsman that the playwright shows great potential. Birdsall's first novel Blue Charm was published by Blackstaff Press, Belfast, in 1995 and was shortlisted for the Authors' Club First Novel Award. This was followed by a series of travelogue books published by Arteventbook, Pisa: Tuscany by Vespa, 2005, La Mia Umbria in Vespa, 2007, Vespa Valdarno Tour, 2009. Whisky Burn - Distilleries of the Highlands and Islands by Vespa, and Whiskey Burn - The Distilleries of Ireland by Vespa, published by Wittenborg University Press, 2015 and 2018 respectively. All the journeys for the books were made on Birdsall's own 1979 Vespa 50. His screenplay Galatea was filmed by the artist Jamie Boyd in 2005.

== Painter ==
In Italy Birdsall lived and assisted in the studio of the Australian artist Arthur Boyd at Paretaio. Moving away from his earlier ‘Florentine’ mannerist style, in recent years he has painted on small wooden panels with the palette knife technique inspired by the nineteenth century Tuscan Macchiaioli group of 'plein air' artists who painted on old cigar box lids. His travelogue books are illustrated with his characteristic 15x30cm oils on panel that can easily fit onto the back of a Vespa. Birdsall has exhibited paintings in one man shows and group exhibitions in several countries since the early nineties. Birdsall's interest in art may have been inspired by his uncle Timothy Birdsall, a notable cartoonist and illustrator who worked for The Sunday Times, The Spectator and appeared in the BBC satirical show "That Was the Week that Was".

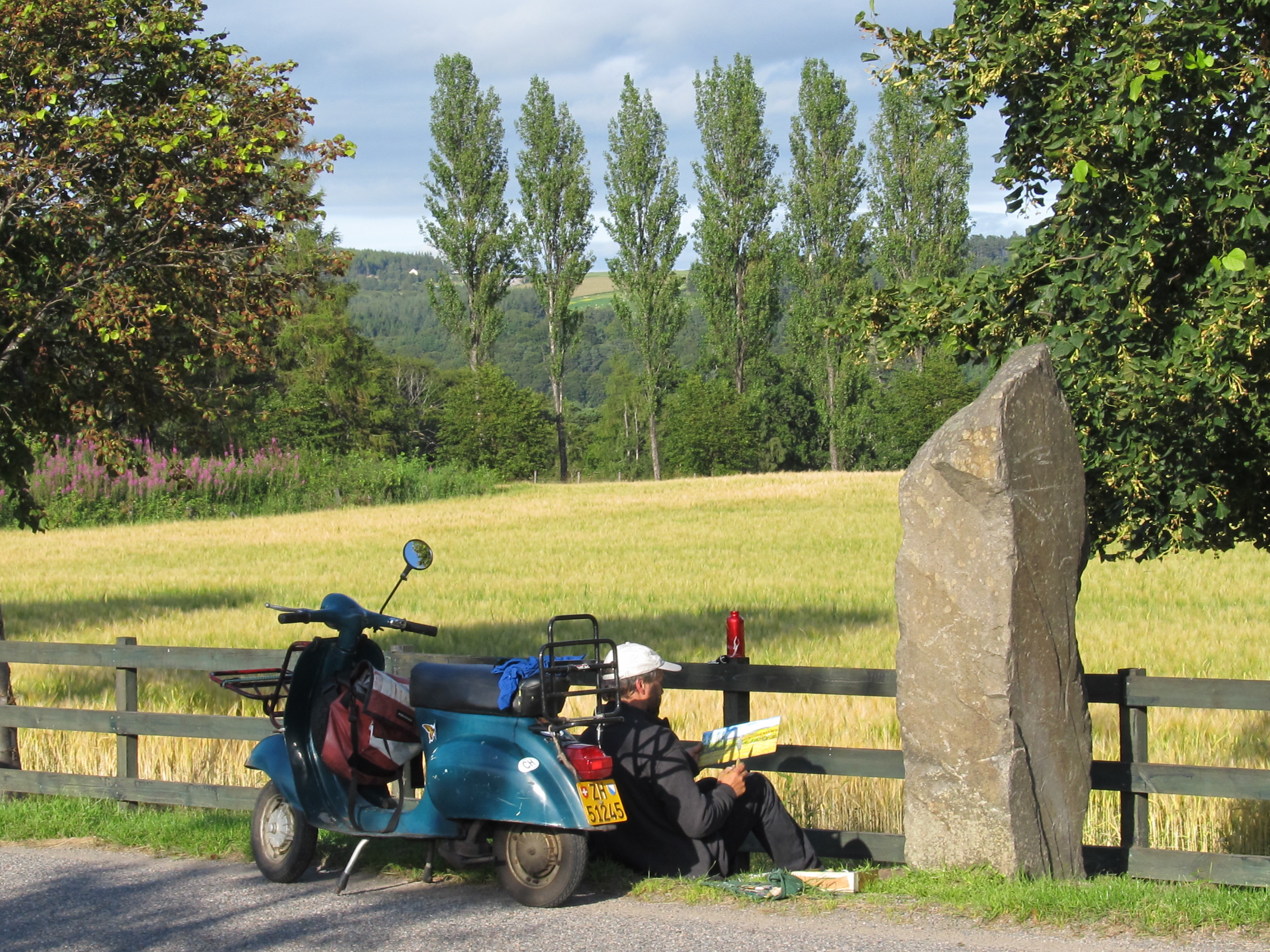
Ben Birdsall painting en plien air, Macallan distillery, Scotland

== Works ==
- Blue Charm, Blackstaff Press, 1995 ISBN 978-0856405440
- Tuscany by Vespa (Italian translation: La mia Toscana in Vespa), Arteventbook, Pisa, 2001 ISBN 978-8890316517
- La mia Umbria in Vespa, Arteventbook, Pisa, 2001 ISBN 978-88-96356-19-7
- Vespa Valdarno Tour, Arteventbook, Pisa, 2001 ISBN 978-88-96356-12-8
- Whisky Burn – Distilleries of the Highlands and Islands by Vespa, Wittenborg University Press, Netherlands, 2015 ISBN 978-94-6228-597-2
- Whiskey Burn – The Distilleries of Ireland by Vespa, Wittenborg University Press, Netherlands, 2018 ISBN 978-94-93066-00-7

== Personal life ==
Birdsall moved to Winterthur, Switzerland, in 2005. He is married and has one daughter.
