= WHU – Otto Beisheim School of Management =

German business school

Coordinates: 50.4003°N 7.6135°E

- Motto: Excellence in management education
- Type: Private research university Business school
- Established: 1984
- Affiliations: AACSB, EQUIS, FIBAA
- Dean: Professor Christian Andres
- Faculty: 43 full professors, 10 assistant professors, 3 adjunct professors, 270 professional staff members (Sept. 2024)
- Students: 2,063 (October 2026)
- Location: Vallendar, Rhineland-Palatinate, Germany
- Campus: Vallendar and Düsseldorf
- Colors: Blue and white
- Website: www.whu.edu

WHU – Otto Beisheim School of Management is a private German business school with campuses in Vallendar and Düsseldorf, Germany. As of October 2026, there are more than 2,050 students at WHU, 270 employees and 56 professors.

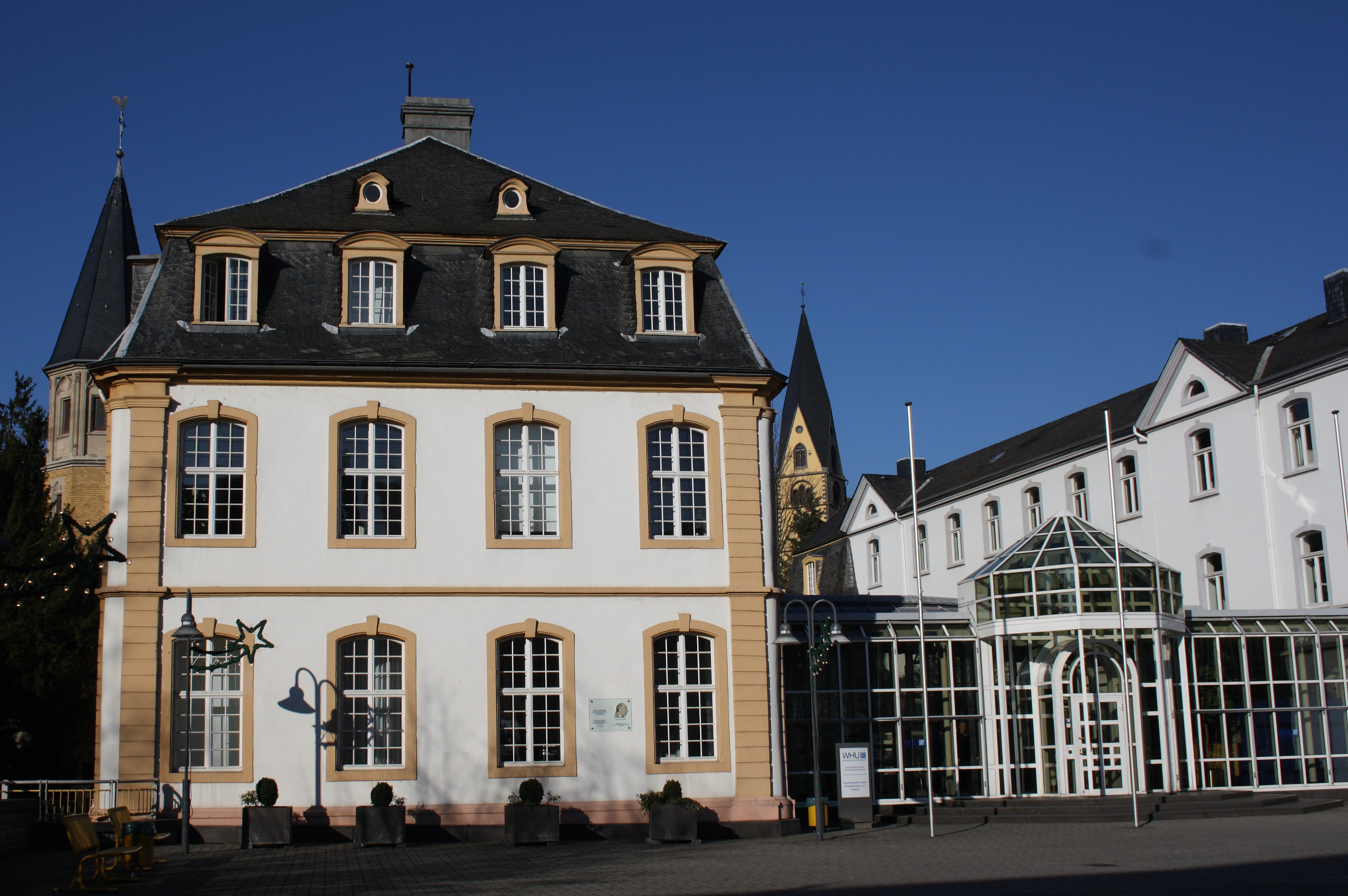
The Marienburg in Vallendar is the main building of WHU.

== Academics ==
=== Rankings ===
WHU is regularly placed in the top positions in German university rankings.

WHU’s Institutional Rankings
Name of the Ranking	Scope	Year	Overall	Germany
Financial Times European Business School	Europe	2025	20	3
U-Multirank	Global	2022	top tier / 1	top tier / 1
Universum Career Check	Germany	2024	top tier	top tier
Trendence	Germany	2026	top tier	top tier
Wirtschaftswoche Hochschulranking	Germany	2022	10	10
CHE Hochschulranking	Germany	2026	top tier	top tier

WHU’s Program-Specific Rankings
Publisher	Ranking	Scope	Year	Worldwide	Germany
Financial Times	Master in Management	Global	2026	19th	1st
Financial Times	Master in Finance	Global	2026	29th	1st
Financial Times	Global MBA	Global	2026	69th	2nd
Financial Times	Executive MBA	Global	2026	34th	2nd
Financial Times	Executive Education Open Programs	Global	2026	29th	2nd
Financial Times	Executive Education Customized Programs	Global	2026	45th	2nd
The Economist	Master in Management	Global	2021	8th	1st
The Economist	Which MBA?	Global	2022	83rd	3rd
The Economist	Executive MBA	Global	2020	4th	1st
QS World University Rankings	Top MBA	Global	2027	58th	3rd
QS World University Rankings	Global Joint EMBA	Global	2026	5th	1st
QS World University Rankings	Master in Management	Global	2027	24th	1st
QS World University Rankings	Master in Finance	Global	2027	33rd	2nd
QS World University Rankings	International Trade (MIB)	Global	2027	5th	1st
QS World University Rankings	Online MBA	Global	2026	24th	1st
Corporate Knights Better World MBA	MBA	Global	2025	34th	3rd

== History ==
WHU was founded in 1984 by the Koblenz Chamber of Commerce as the Wissenschaftliche Hochschule für Unternehmensführung, with preparations for the founding starting in 1983. Starting in 1986, the school began offering a doctoral studies program, and the process for offering postdoctoral studies began in 1997.

The name was modified in 1993 to honour WHU's benefactor, the businessman Otto Beisheim, after he donated 50 Million Deutsche Mark.

In 1997, an executive MBA with Kellogg School of Management was started. A year later, the school received a EQUIS-accreditation, followed by a FIBAA in 2005 and the beginning of MBA studies the same year. In 2006, the school became a member of AACSB, and was re-accredited by EQUIS in 2009.

Ulrich Lichtenthaler, a professor at the university, had his right to teach revoked in 2013 after accusations of scientific misconduct.

== Entrepreneurship ==
A study by the Technical University of Munich titled Entrepreneurial Impact of Academic Institutions 2025 – DACH Ranking: Munich Impact Study found that, according to the study, WHU has the highest number of startups per student in Germany, with approximately 350 startups per 1,000 students. The same study also identified WHU as the university with the second-highest absolute number of startup foundations in Germany between 2014 and 2024.

The University Startup Index 2025, published by Redstone and RWTH Aachen University, ranks WHU as the most efficient university in Europe according to its methodology in terms of startup creation relative to its budget, reporting the highest number of new startup foundations (88.0) per €100 million in university funding.

Reports published by the venture capital firm Antler in 2022 and 2023 also indicate that WHU ranks first among German universities and second in Europe—after the University of Oxford—in terms of the number of founders of so-called unicorn companies.

The business school's critics say it fosters an overly competitive environment, places too much emphasis on rankings, and that it focuses excessive memorisation. After the death of a student who was believed to have died due to overworking himself during an internship but was found to have died due to an underlying condition, the school responded that high pressure is an unfortunately norm in the business world and that they are taking steps to address it.

== Notable alumni ==
- Verena Hubertz, German Federal Minister for Housing, Urban Development and Building
- Thomas Buberl, CEO of Axa Group
- Julian Deutz, CFO of Axel Springer, diploma
- Robert Gentz, founder and board member of Zalando, diploma 2007
- Andreas Nick, Member of the Bundestag (German parliament), diploma 1990, PhD 1994
- Matthias J. Rapp, CFO of TÜV SÜD AG
- Oliver Samwer, CEO of Rocket Internet
- Christoph Schweizer, CEO of the Boston Consulting Group
- David Schneider, founder and board member of Zalando, diploma 2007
- Margret Suckale, board member of BASF, EMBA
- Oliver Zipse, board member of BMW, EMBA 1997
