= Hermann Schubert (economist) =

German economist (born 1964)

Hermann Schubert (born 10 July 1964) is a German economist and historian of economics.

== Career ==
Born in Munich, Schubert studied economics at LMU Munich from 1988 to 1994 and obtained his doctorate at the Faculty of Economics of the LMU in 2008 after a two-year doctoral program at the School for Advanced Studies in the Social Sciences (EHESS) in Paris. Since 2011, he holds a professorship in economics and since 2016 at the International School of Management in Stuttgart. Schubert's main research interests are capital market oriented macroeconomics, income and wealth distribution and the history of economics.
