= Wittenborg University of Applied Sciences =

University of Applied Sciences

Coordinates: 52.208837°N 5.967427°E

- Former name: Hogeschool Wittenborg
- Motto: Better Yourself, Better Our World
- Type: Private, business school
- Established: 1987
- Accreditation: All degree programmes accredited by NVAO BBA, MBA Double Accredited FIBAA
- Academic affiliation: NRTO
- Academic staff: 131
- Administrative staff: 87
- Total staff: 218 (55 nationalities)
- Students: 1100 (110 nationalities)
- Undergraduates: 600
- Postgraduates: 500
- Location: Apeldoorn & Amsterdam, Netherlands
- Campus: Urban
- Language: English
- Colors: Blue, white
- Website: http://www.wittenborg.eu

Wittenborg University of Applied Sciences (abbreviated as WUAS; Dutch: Hogeschool Wittenborg) is a Dutch government accredited private Vocational University established 1987 in the centre of the Netherlands, offering bachelor's and master's degrees - vocational education - at higher level.

== Overview ==
The main campus of Wittenborg is situated in Apeldoorn, the Netherlands, and was originally known in Dutch as Hogeschool Wittenborg. It officially changed its name to Wittenborg University of Applied Sciences in February 2013. Wittenborg positions itself as an international management and business school, offering all of its programmes in English.

Wittenborg was appointed (in Dutch "aangewezen") by the Netherlands government in 1996, which means that the school falls under the regulations and laws of the Ministry of Education, Culture and Science, including the Ministry Inspectorate. Under Dutch law, it is now known as an Entity for Higher Education and its Dutch accredited bachelor and master programmes are registered in the Central Register (CROHO) of Higher Education in the Netherlands. The bachelor and master programmes are accredited by the Netherlands and Flemish Accreditation Agency (NVAO). The bachelor and master programmes are also accredited by the Foundation for International Business Administration Accreditation (FIBAA).

== History ==
Wittenborg College was founded in 1987 in the Dutch Hanseatic city of Deventer by a local businessman, H. Nijkamp. The school became known for its Dutch language programmes in banking and insurance and real estate management, providing these industries in the Netherlands with hundreds of college graduates. Its main source of students in the late 1980s and early 1990s was military personnel leaving the armed forces due to the abolition of national service in the Netherlands.

In 2002, Wittenborg partnered with BTC, an international family consultancy specialised in corporate training programmes, and founded the Wittenborg University of Applied Sciences which began developing its international, English language, business programmes, gaining state accreditation from the European-recognised NVAO in 2006.

Since 2006, Wittenborg has developed as a business school focused on entrepreneurship and SME management within an international context. Since then, the school has attracted students from around the world to study in the Netherlands emerging as an international management institute focusing on business, hospitality and communication within a global context. All programmes are offered in English to students from more than 97 countries.

In September 2016, in her letter to the Dutch Parliament, Minister of Education, Culture and Science (in Dutch "minister van Onderwijs, Cultuur en Wetenschap") Jet Bussemaker, mentioned Wittenborg as an example of an institute that had implemented internationalisation across its whole profile.

== New location ==
In 2010, Wittenborg moved from Deventer into its own wing within the Aventus building in Apeldoorn, less than 15 kilometers to the west. This move was made possible by the City Government of Apeldoorn, as part of its ambition to attract more higher education institutions to the city. In 2015, Wittenborg opened two additional locations: one location in Apeldoorn at the Spoorstraat 23 and one location at the Dali Building in Amsterdam.

== Partnerships ==
In June 2011 Wittenborg Business School and NTI University announced plans to begin offering an English language variant of NTI's Action Learning Master of Business Administration (MBA) programme to international students.

In 2011, Wittenborg announced plans to offer three M.Sc. programmes in partnership with the University of Brighton (UK). The programmes in international hospitality management, international tourism and international event management were launched in Apeldoorn from September 2012.

== Programmes ==
Bachelor's in international business administration programmes specialised in:

- Economics and management
- Hospitality management
- Marketing and communication
- Financial services management
- Information management
- Real estate management
- Logistics and international trade
- Entrepreneurship and SME management

Master programmes

- International hospitality management (M.Sc.)
- International event management (M.Sc.)
- International tourism management (M.Sc.)
- Master of Business Administration (MBA)

== Wittenborg University Press ==
In 2013, Wittenborg University launched its publishing arm, Wittenborg University Press, which aims to produce publications of interest and relevance to its students, alumni and a wider audience. Publications include Sustainable Value Creation (2013) by Teun Wolters. ISBN 978-9081699693 and Whisky Burn - distilleries of Scotland by Vespa (2015), by Ben Birdsall ISBN 978-94-6228-597-2 .

== See also ==
- List of business schools in Europe
