= Antifragile =

Antifragility is a property of systems in which they benefit from shocks.

Antifragile or Anti-fragile may refer to:

- Antifragile (book), a 2012 book by Nassim Nicholas Taleb
- Antifragile (EP), 2022 EP by Le Sserafim
  - "Antifragile" (song), 2022 song by Le Sserafim
- Antifragile (album), 2025 album by All That Remains
