= Foundation for International Business Administration Accreditation =

Recognised accreditation body

- Abbreviation: FIBAA
- Formation: 2002
- Type: NGO
- Purpose: Educational accreditation
- Location: Bonn, North Rhine-Westphalia, Germany
- Members: ENQA; EUA; European Consortium for Accreditation; EQAR
- Director: Hans-Jürgen Brackmann
- Website: www.fibaa.com

The Foundation for International Business Administration Accreditation (FIBAA) is recognised accreditation body in all German speaking countries (Germany-Switzerland-Austria), FIBAA was founded in 2002 to accredit schools of business. Since the launch of the European Bologna Process, along with the transition to bachelor's and master's programs and the growing independence available to higher education institutions (HEIs) in designing their degree programs, the call for the HEIs to establish and advance sound and transparent quality assurance systems has grown continuously.

When the accreditation system was established in Germany, FIBAA was founded in 1994 and hence became one of the first agencies to be accredited by the German Accreditation Council. Since 2002, it has been entitled to award the Seal of the Accreditation Council for degree programs in Germany. The FIBAA is organized as a non-profit organization and is headquartered in Bonn, North Rhine-Westphalia, Germany as well FIBAA is registered in Zurich, Switzerland

The FIBAA Foundation Council is the leading board of the foundation. It defines and represents the common interests of the founders and decides on the economic and strategic baselines of FIBAA's work. The FIBAA Foundation Council assures that FIBAA's mission is well established in society and its institutions and promotes FIBAA's overall values of transparency, quality and internationality in the field of higher education.

== International activities ==
FIBAA is recognised as a quality assurance agency in:

- Germany – Accreditation by the German Accreditation Council
- Switzerland – Recognition by the Federal Department of Economics Affairs FDEA
- Netherlands – Recognition by the Nederlands Vlaamse Accreditatie Organisatie (NVAO)
- Kazakhstan - Recognition by the Ministry of Education and Science of Kazakhstan
- Austria– Recognition by the Federal Ministry for Science and Research

Europe-wide – Full membership in European Association for Quality Assurance in Higher Education (ENQA) Europe-wide-Listed in the European Quality Assurance Register for Higher Education (EQAR)

== History ==
Even before the Bologna Declaration announced by the European ministers responsible for higher education in 1999 and the resulting introduction of today's quality assurance systems, it became necessary to develop a suitable form of quality testing due to the confusing range of MBA programs that had developed in Germany, Austria and Switzerland. Hence, the leading organisations of Swiss, Austrian and German industry established the Foundation for International Business Administration Accreditation (FIBAA) in autumn 1994 as an international non-profit foundation. Right from day one, the intention was to develop a strict assessment guide for quality assurance in the field of management training.

Since its founding, FIBAA has established itself as a quality assurance agency which assesses degree programs, HEIs and their quality management. It examines and promotes German and foreign state and state-recognised private HEIs and universities.

== Accreditation objectives ==
The accreditation of degree programs is an internationally established quality assurance process in the higher education sector. It serves to maintain fundamental standards in terms of the content and structural design of educational offerings, to secure the comparability of various study offerings at national and international level, and to facilitate the international recognition of academic achievements and degrees.

FIBAA's work is shaped by an intensive quality process in close cooperation with the HEIs, whose goals are, on the one hand, to improve their quality and, on the other, to provide a successful, accreditation, certification or evaluation process.

FIBAA considers itself a non-profit quality assurance agency committed to the following goals:

- Securing and improving quality in the higher education sector,
- Contributing to the transparency of studies offered for the employment market, for students, companies, and for the HEIs themselves,
- Collaborating in the elaboration of principles for the quality process in the national and international education sector,
- Taking into consideration European and international concepts and guidelines in the field of quality assurance in the higher education sector, and
- Applying transparent combinations of information, quality standards and procedural principles.

== Accredited institutions ==
This list is not exhaustive:

- Technische Universität Berlin
- Berlin School of Economics and Law
- EBS University of Business and Law
- European School of Management and Technology
- FOM University of Applied Sciences for Economics and Management
- Munich Business School
- RWTH Aachen University
- Steinbeis-Hochschule Berlin
- Stuttgart Technology University of Applied Sciences
- University of Bayreuth
- University of Düsseldorf
- University of Marburg
- Wisconsin International University in Ukraine
- WHU – Otto Beisheim School of Management
- Wittenborg University of Applied Sciences

== See also ==
- List of recognized higher education accreditation organizations
- Higher education accreditation
- Educational accreditation
