= Peter Terium =

Dutch business executive

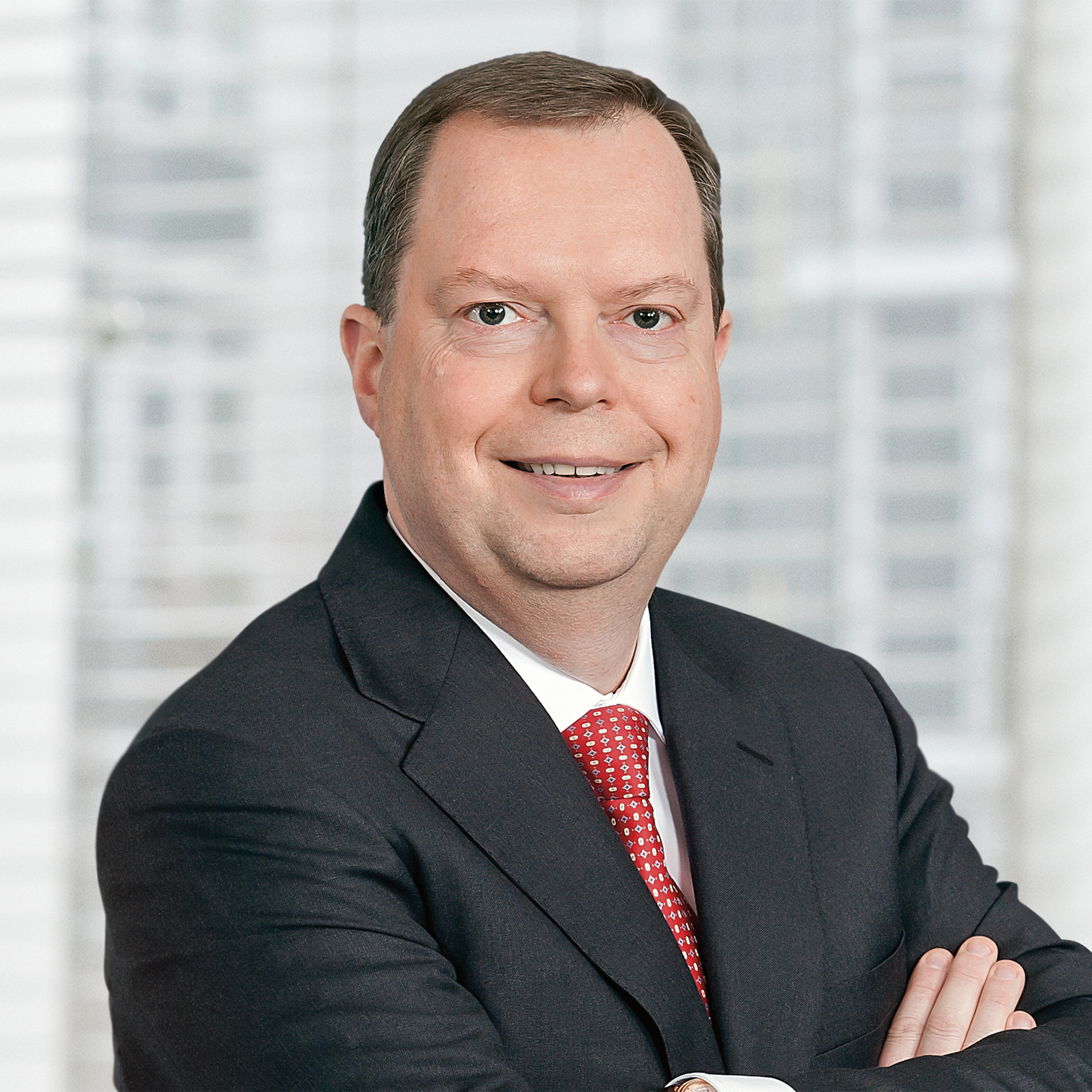
- Terium in 2012
- Born: September 26, 1963 (age 62); Nederweert, Netherlands
- Occupation: Business executive
- Known for: Former CEO of innogy and RWE

Peter Terium (born September 26, 1963) is a Dutch business executive and was the former CEO of innogy and RWE.

== Life ==
Terium is a trained accountant and began his career as an auditor at the Ministry of Finance followed by positions at KPMG as well as Schmalbach-Lubeca. In January 2003, Terium joined the RWE Group. He started as Head of Group Controlling at RWE AG and in 2004 also became Member of the Executive Board of RWE Umwelt AG. In July 2005, Terium was appointed as Chief Executive Officer of RWE Trading GmbH. His responsibilities included; the merger of RWE Trading GmbH and RWE Gas Midstream GmbH into RWE Supply & Trading GmbH, of which he became Chief Executive Officer in April of 2008.

From 2009 until 31 December 2011, Terium was CEO of Essent, a subsidiary of the German energy supplier RWE. Terium was appointed Deputy Chairman of the Executive Board of RWE AG in September 2011. From July of 2012 until October of 2016, Terium was Chief Executive Officer of RWE AG. While Rolf Martin Schmitz succeeded him in this position in 2016, he moved to RWE's subsidiary Innogy SE, where he functioned as CEO from April 1, 2016 until December 19, 2017.
