= Burton Nanus =

American academic

Burton B. "Burt" Nanus (born 1936, New York, NY) is an American academic, Professor Emeritus at the University of Southern California, where he was a faculty member from 1969 to 1994.

== Biography ==
- Bachelor of Science, Stevens Institute of Technology, 1957
- Master of Science, Massachusetts Institute of Technology, 1959
- Doctor of Business Administration, University of Southern California, 1967. He wrote his thesis on "The implications of EDP for multinational business operations."

Prior to joining the University of Southern California, he worked at Sperry Rand Corporation, the System Development Corporation, and his own consulting firm, Planning Technology, Incorporated.

== Academic work ==
Nanus is the author of several books:

- (with Stephen M Dobbs) Leaders Who Make a Difference: Essential Strategies for Meeting the Nonprofit Challenge, San Francisco : Jossey-Bass 1999
- Leading the Way to Organizational Renewal, Portland, Or. : Productivity Press, 1996
- Visionary Leadership (J-B US non-Franchise Leadership), 1995
  - Translated into German as Visionäre Führung, into Spanish as Liderazgo visionario : forjando nuevas realidades con grandes ideas. and into Japanese as ビジョン・リーダー : 魅力ある未来像の創造と実現に向かって (Romanized JP: Bijon rīdā : Miryoku aru bijon no sōzo to jitsugen ni mukatte)
- The Vision Retreat: a Facilitator's Guide, San Francisco : Jossey-Bass, 1995
- Visionary Leadership: Creating a Compelling Sense of Direction for Your Organization,: San Francisco : Jossey-Bass, 1992 According to WorldCat, the book is held in 1291 libraries
  - Translated into Polish as Wizjonerskie przywództwo : jak stworzyć atrakcyjną wizję dla twojej organizacji?
- The Leader's Edge: the Seven Keys to Leadership in a Turbulent World, Chicago : Contemporary Books, 1989
- Leaders: The Strategies for Taking Charge, 1985, co-authored with Warren Bennis
  - Translated into French as Diriger
- Developing strategies for the information society, 1982
- The emerging network marketplace, 1981
