= Innovation butterfly =

Butterfly effect in business

The innovation butterfly is a metaphor that describes how seemingly minor perturbations (disturbances or changes) to project plans in a system connecting markets, demand, product features, and a firm's capabilities can steer the project, or an entire portfolio of projects, down an irreversible path in terms of technology and market evolution.

== Origins ==
The metaphor was developed by researchers Anderson and Joglekar. It was conceived as a specific instance of the more general 'butterfly effect' encountered in chaos theory.

== How it works ==
The innovation butterfly arises because many innovation systems are made up of a large number of elements that interact with each other via several non-linear feedback loops containing embedded delays, thus constituting a complex system.

Perturbations can come from decisions made within the firm or from those made by its competitors, or they can result from external forces such as government legislation or environmental regulations, or unexpected spikes in the price of oil. How the innovation system evolves as a result of the innovation butterfly can lead ultimately to an innovative firm's success or failure.

Complex systems, in domains such as physics, biology, or sociology, are known to be prone to both path dependence and emergent behavior. What makes the behavior of the innovation butterfly different is market selection, along with biases in individual and group decision making within distributed innovation settings, which may influence the emergent behavior. Furthermore, managers in most fields of business endeavor to reduce uncertainty in order to better manage risk. In innovation settings, however, because success is based upon creativity, managers must actively embrace uncertainty. This leads to a management conundrum because innovation managers and management systems must encourage the potential for a butterfly effect but then must also learn how to cope with its aftermath.

How innovation butterflies are 'chased' is highly managerially relevant. Most butterflies end up 'merely' consuming a considerable amount of time and resources within a project, or for an innovation portfolio, within a firm. However, some butterflies can also unleash regime-altering emergent outcomes within an entire industry segment. Moreover, once these emergent outcomes begin to mature, and in some instances lead to disruptive innovations, they become extremely difficult to manage, Hence, shaping the innovation system before potential innovation butterfly's effects completely emerge is critical.

== See also ==
- Volatility, uncertainty, complexity and ambiguity
- Path dependence

== Research literature ==
=== Books ===
- Anderson, Edward G. Jr. and Nitin R. Joglekar (2012). The Innovation Butterfly: Managing Emergent Opportunities and Risks During Distributed Innovation, Springer (Understanding Complex Systems Series). Online version
- Christensen, Clayton M. (1997). The Innovator's Dilemma : When New Technologies Cause Great Firms to Fail. Harvard Business Press.
