= Klaus Evard =

German economist (1936–2024)

- Born: February 2, 1936; Berlin, Germany
- Died: August 30, 2024 (aged 88); Wiesbaden, Germany
- Education: Free University of Berlin; Universities of Lausanne; Innsbruck

Klaus Evard (2 February 1936 in Berlin - 30 August 2024 in Wiesbaden) was a German economist, university teacher, founder of the German business school EBS Universität für Wirtschaft und Recht, and entrepreneur.

== Early life and education ==
Evard was born in Berlin on February 2nd, 1936. He studied economics, business administration, and law at the Free University of Berlin and the Universities of Lausanne, Paris (Sorbonne) and Innsbruck. In 1972, he earned a doctorate from the Université Paris 1 Panthéon-Sorbonne with the dissertation Bilan consolidé et publicité des entreprises du Konzern d’après la législation allemande contemporaine, concerned consolidated financial statements and corporate disclosure under German law.

== Career ==
In 1971, Evard founded the European Business School (EBS) in Offenbach am Main. The school was established with an internationally oriented and practice-based approach to business education. Its first cohort began studying in Offenbach that year. It was later recognized as a university-level institution and later became EBS Universität für Wirthschaft. Evard served as the institution's president from 1971 to 1994. Evard also founded the EBS Paris and the EBS London.

Evard was, among other positions, a professor at the École des hautes études commerciales de Paris (HEC), the leading business school in France, and at the Université de la Sorbonne Nouvelle in Paris.

Evard was also involved in the founding of other universities. He initiated and supported the establishment of the International School of Management (ISM) in Dortmund and the California School of International Management in San Diego, where he also served as chairman from 1992.
