= Albert School of Business & Data =

University in Paris, France

Albert School is a private higher education institution based in Paris, specialising in data analysis and management. It was founded in 2022 by entrepreneurs Grégoire Genest, Mathieu Schimpl, and Matthieu Heurtel.

== History ==
Founded in 2022 in Paris by entrepreneurs Grégoire Genest, Mathieu Schimpl, and Matthieu Heurtel, an associate of former French Digital Minister Cédric O, Albert School trains students in data-driven careers. Positioned as an innovative blend of business and engineering schools, it is named in homage to Albert Einstein. The curriculum emphasises quantitative disciplines, with half of the courses dedicated to mathematics, data science and AI, the other half to business and humanities. The school was established to address the growing demand for hybrid professionals who combine technical expertise with business acumen.

Its 20 investors include Xavier Niel (Iliad), Bernard Arnault (LVMH), Rodolphe Saadé (CMA CGM), Jacques-Antoine Granjon (Veepee), Marc Simoncini (Meetic), Anne Lange, and eight unicorn companies (e.g., Contentsquare, PayFit, ManoMano, Jellysmack, Vestiaire Collective, Veepee, and Voodoo). Together, they invested €8 million to launch the Paris campus.

Albert School has opened campuses in Marseille (2023), Lyon (2024), Geneva, Madrid and Milan (2025). The institution aims to establish 50 global campuses by 2035.

== Programmes ==
The school’s academic offerings are structured around three core programmes: Data, Mathematics and Business.

The Bachelor in Business, Data & AI is an undergraduate programme open to students after high school. It offers core training in business management and data analysis, and awards a degree equivalent to three years of university study.

For students seeking advanced specialisation, the Specialised Master’s programme offers focused tracks in data-driven business, entrepreneurship, marketing, finance, and sustainable development. This programme requires a third-year internship, ensuring direct professional experience.

The "Grande École" Programme (PGE) is a five-year course that combines both bachelor's and master’s studies, ending with a degree equivalent to five years of university education.

Albert School’s Bachelor and Master programmes, offered in partnership with Mines Paris – PSL, have received official French state recognition.

The Bachelor in Science and Engineering is authorized to confer the “Grade de Licence” and is accredited by the Commission des Titres d’Ingénieur (CTI) and the French Ministry of Higher Education and Research.

The Master of Science is authorized to confer the “Grade de Master” under the decree of 3 March 2026, published in the Journal officiel on 12 April 2026.

Albert School is a pioneer in Web3 education, delivering specialised programmes in the metaverse, cryptocurrencies, and blockchain technology to equip students for the future of the decentralised internet.

== Academic partnerships ==
In 2024, Albert School established a significant academic partnership with École des Mines de Paris, launching joint programmes at the bachelor and master levels. This collaboration reflects the school’s commitment to integrating engineering and business education. Both institutions jointly manage recruitment, training, and graduation.

In 2025, the school expanded its international academic network by introducing the "AI & Entrepreneurship" Master’s programme in collaboration with the POLIMI Graduate School of Management in Milan. That same year, Albert School also created a dual Bachelor’s degree in data science with EDHEC Business School, offered on its Lille and Nice campuses.

== Corporate partnerships ==
Albert School maintains strong ties with a diverse range of leading corporations, facilitating internships and work-study opportunities for its students. Notable partners include LVMH, Google, Boston Consulting Group (BCG), Facebook, Capgemini, Cajoo, Carrefour, the French Ministry of Armed Forces, IBM, CMA CGM, Henkel, Edmond de Rothschild Group, Payfit, Nestlé, Reply, Alan, Orange Group and Asmodee. Additionally, students at the Madrid campus benefit from collaborations with IBEX 35 firms, while those in Lyon engage with local companies such as Groupe SEB, Descours & Cabaud, and Vicat.

== Key figures ==
Albert School’s inaugural class in 2022 consisted of 33 students, with 30% receiving scholarships. The following year, the school attracted 1,500 applications for just 92 Bachelor’s and 80 Master’s spots. By 2023, enrollment had increased to 150 students.

Tuition at Albert School is €13,900 per year for the Bachelor’s programme and €16,900 per year for the Master’s programme.

== Accessibility policy ==
Albert School promotes social diversity through scholarships covering 50% to 100% of tuition, funded by its corporate and donor network. MSc students benefit from fully funded tuition via apprenticeship contracts.

== See also ==
- Mines Paris – PSL
- POLIMI Graduate School of Management
