= Buzzle =

Apple reseller in Australia

- Type: Defunct
- Industry: Retail
- Founded: September 2000; 26 years ago
- Defunct: March 2001; 25 years ago
- Headquarters: Sydney, New South Wales, Australia
- Area served: Australia
- Key people: Thomas Qureshi, Chief Executive Officer

Buzzle was the largest Apple reseller in Australia, the result of the amalgamation of several resellers. At time of collapse, Buzzle had sales of A$85 million, accounting for 40% of Apple Australia's turnover and operating 24 of Australia's 68 AppleCentres. The company formed in September 2000 and later went into receivership in March 2001. The company owed A$30 million to 866 creditors at the time of collapse. Buzzle was the result of the amalgamation of DesignWyse, Status Graph, GM Computer, Mac's Place and Manning Computers. Next Byte pulled out at the eleventh hour. The company had intended to become a public company.

The company sued Apple Computer Australia for A$57 million following the company's receivership citing that Apple was responsible for the company's demise. Most of the stores were sold and operate under other brands today.

Buzzle was the subject of Going Public, a four-part Australian Broadcasting Corporation documentary which aired in 2001.
