= Albert School (disambiguation) =

Albert School is a school in Paris, France.

It may refer to schools, or former schools, in multiple nations:

- Albert Academy, Freetown, Sierra Leone
- Albert Community Centre, Saskatoon, Saskatchewan, Canada, originally named Albert School
- Greater St. Albert Catholic Schools, Alberta, Canada
- Mount Albert Grammar School, Central Auckland, New Zealand
- The Royal Alexandra and Albert School, Reigate, Surrey, England
- Saint Alberts High School, Zimbabwe
- Saint Albert High School, Council Bluffs, Iowa
- St. Albert the Great Elementary School, Louisville, Kentucky
- Williams Creek School, Gillespie County, Texas, US, originally named Albert School
