= Maxim's Art Nouveau "Collection 1900" =

Private art collection in Paris, France

Coordinates: 48.8675°N 2.3222°E

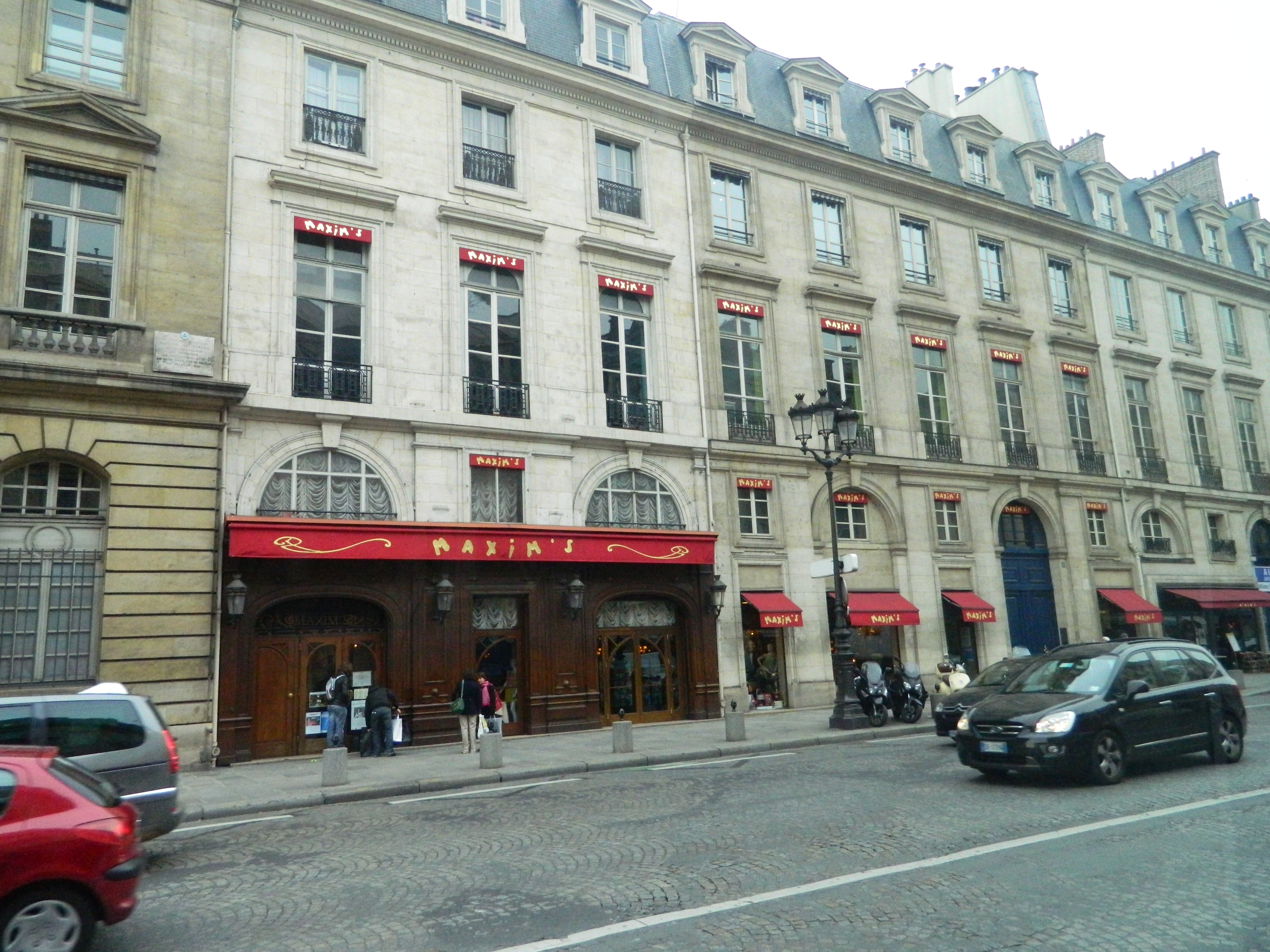
The façade of Maxim's Restaurant

Maxim's Art Nouveau "Collection 1900", also known as the Musée Art Nouveau - Maxim's, is a private collection of Art Nouveau objects and decor, located in the 8th arrondissement above Maxim's Paris restaurant at 3, Rue Royale, Paris, France. It is open for guided tours in afternoons except Monday and Tuesday; an admission fee is charged.

Pierre Cardin (the owner since 1981 of Maxim's restaurant, a symbol for Art Nouveau) has collected for over 60 years objects from the Belle Époque. There are more than 550 pieces from all over the world, signed by Louis Majorelle, Louis Comfort Tiffany, Émile Gallé, Henri de Toulouse-Lautrec and Clement Massier. These objects are displayed in a 12-room apartment building (three floors) which is now classified as a historic monument.

Highlights of the collection include furniture by Majorelle, a sofa inspired by Antoni Gaudí and recreations of bedrooms from that time period.

== See also ==
- List of museums in Paris
