= Laurent de Gourcuff =

French businessman

- Born: Neuilly-sur-Seine, France
- Education: European Business School Paris
- Occupation: Businessman
- Title: Chairman and CEO, Paris Society
- Spouse: Constance de Gourcuff
- Children: 3

Laurent de Gourcuff (born 1976 or 1977) is a French businessman, the founder of the hospitality company Paris Society.

== Early life and education ==
The de Gourcuffs are a Breton noble family, originally from Plovan. Laurent de Gourcuff was born in Neuilly-sur-Seine; his parents ran restaurants and organised events. After hosting paying parties as a 16-year-old and admitting to cheating on his baccalauréat, he graduated from the European Business School Paris.

== Career ==
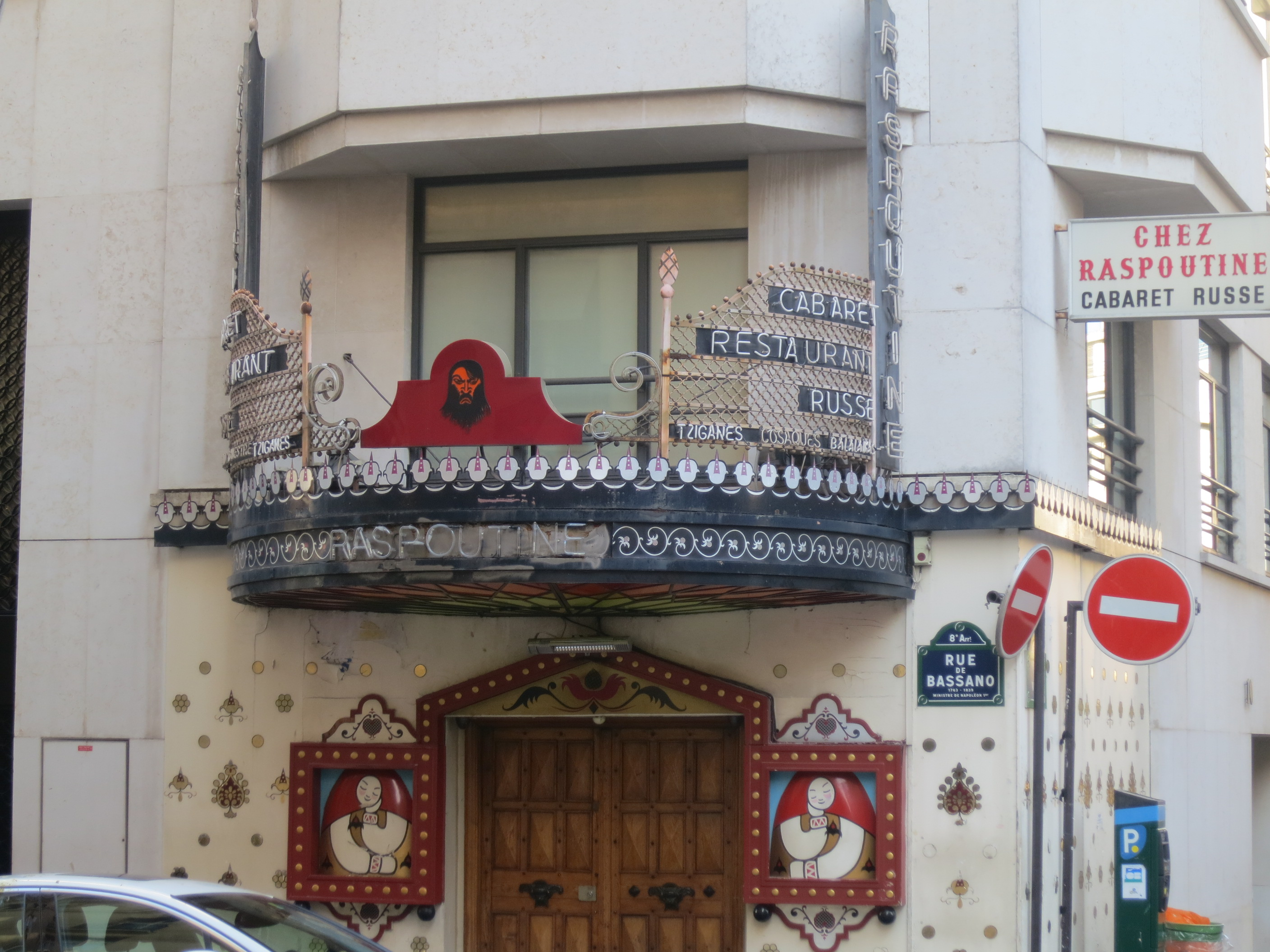
Le Raspoutine, a Paris cabaret-restaurant in de Gourcuff's holdings

His early career was as an owner of nightlife establishments. He started his first company, Octopussy, when he was 21, and bought his first club, Les Planches, when he was 22. In 2008, he founded Groupe Noctis, which he expanded to include several restaurants and nightclubs in Paris, many in association with Gilles Malafosse. His first restaurant was Monsieur Bleu, in the Palais de Tokyo, opened with Malafosse in 2013. He was one of a new generation of nightculb and restaurant entrepreneurs in Paris that also included Benjamin Patou and Jean-Philippe Cartier. Despite having to sell several properties in the mid-2000s to pay €3 million in personal debts from a bad investment, he re-established his company holdings and diversified into event spaces and hosting.

As of May 2017, Noctis also had establishments in La Baule-Escoublac and Marseille and on Île de Ré. In July 2017, Accor acquired a 31% share in the company; in 2021 this was increased to 40.8%. Noctis was subsequently renamed to Paris Society and became known for "eatertainment". It has also expanded outside France, including Raspoutine in Miami (a branch of the Paris cabaret restaurant Le Raspoutine), Gigi in Dubai, and properties in Los Angeles and London. Many of de Gourcuff's restaurants offer views from elevated vantage points. In 2019, he transformed the former L'Opéra restaurant at the Palais Garnier opera house into CoCo, a branch of which opened in July 2023 at the former Les Brotteaux station in Lyon. In 2021, Paris Society partnered with the new owner to transform the 17th-century citadel at Belle Île into a luxury hotel. In the early 2020s Paris Society also extensively renovated the former Cistercian Vaux-de-Cernay Abbey. formerly a three-star hotel, into a multi-restaurant luxury hotel with interior design by Cordélia de Castellane.

By 2017, de Gourcuff's rivalry with Patou, chairman of Moma Group, had become contentious; the two agreed in 2019 to end the conflict. Beginning in February 2021, de Gourcuff and others were investigated in connection with the granting of a restaurant licence at Longchamp Racecourse; he was reportedly called in for further questioning in early December 2022. In November 2022, Accor announced its purchase of the outstanding stock in Paris Society, whose estimated revenue for that year was €250 million, with de Gourcuff to remain at its head. In March 2023, de Gourcuff announced that Paris Society had been chosen to operate Maxim's and planned an extensive renovation, which has been completed.

De Gourcuff and Paris Society were found guilty of corrupt dealings in connection with the Longchamp restaurant licence, and in February 2024 he was given a suspended sentence of two years in prison, fined €150,000, and barred from managing a business for five years. His lawyers announced that he would appeal.

In late 2024, de Gourcuff opened Baronne, a restaurant in the Hôtel Salomon de Rothschild in Paris. From July 2025, Accor began to divest itself of Paris Society's club holdings to de Gourcuff and other former Paris Society executives; he took a 70% share in the properties, with Pernod Ricard owning 30%. In October 2025, he bought the Parisian restaurant Le Grand Véfour. In November 2025 it was announced that in advance of the first hearing on his appeal, he had reached an agreement with the courts under which in exchange for pleading guilty and paying a €1m fine, his suspended sentence was reduced to one year, the ban on his managing businesses was lifted, and his criminal record was expunged. In 2026, he partnered with Pierre-Antoine Capton and Xavier Niel to buy the Lily Wang, an Asian restaurant in Paris formerly owned by Niel.

== Personal life ==
De Gourcuff and his wife, Constance, have three children, Dimitri, Paloma and Léonard. He has a second residence in Eure. He is teetotal.
