= European Business School Paris =

Business school in Paris, France

Coordinates: 48.8184004°N 2.3419722°E

- EBS - European Business School
- Type: Business school
- Established: 1967
- Affiliations: UGEI, AACSB International, EFMD, Erasmus
- Faculty: 40
- Students: 1,600
- Location: 9 avenue Pierre de Coubertin, 75013 Paris
- Campus: Urban
- Website: Official website

European Business School Paris (also known as EBS Paris) is a private business school located in Paris, France, part of Groupe ACCELIS.

== History ==
EBS Paris is a European state-accredited school of management. It has a five-year program, is recognized by the French Ministry of Education as a Master's degree qualification, making it a Grande École. It is also a member of UGEI, Conférence des Grandes écoles, European Foundation for Management Development, and Association to Advance Collegiate Schools of Business.

It currently educates international executives and business managers, having over 7,600 alumni in 64 countries. EBS Paris is a partner of the French National Committee of Foreign Trade Advisers. The school has been part of Laureate International Universities since 2013. Bill Clinton was the honorary chancellor of the network from 2010 to 2015.

EBS Paris has been ranked 92 in the top 100 universities in the world by the Ecole des Mines ParisTech in 2011. The ranking was made considering the number of alumni holding management positions in the world's 500 largest companies. It was ranked 29th-best "post-bac" business school by le figaro in 2018.

== Notable alumni ==
- Jacques-Antoine Granjon, French entrepreneur and CEO
- Arthur Sadoun, French businessman
- Laurent de Gourcuff, French businessman.
