= Reseller =

Company or individual that buys goods or services for resale

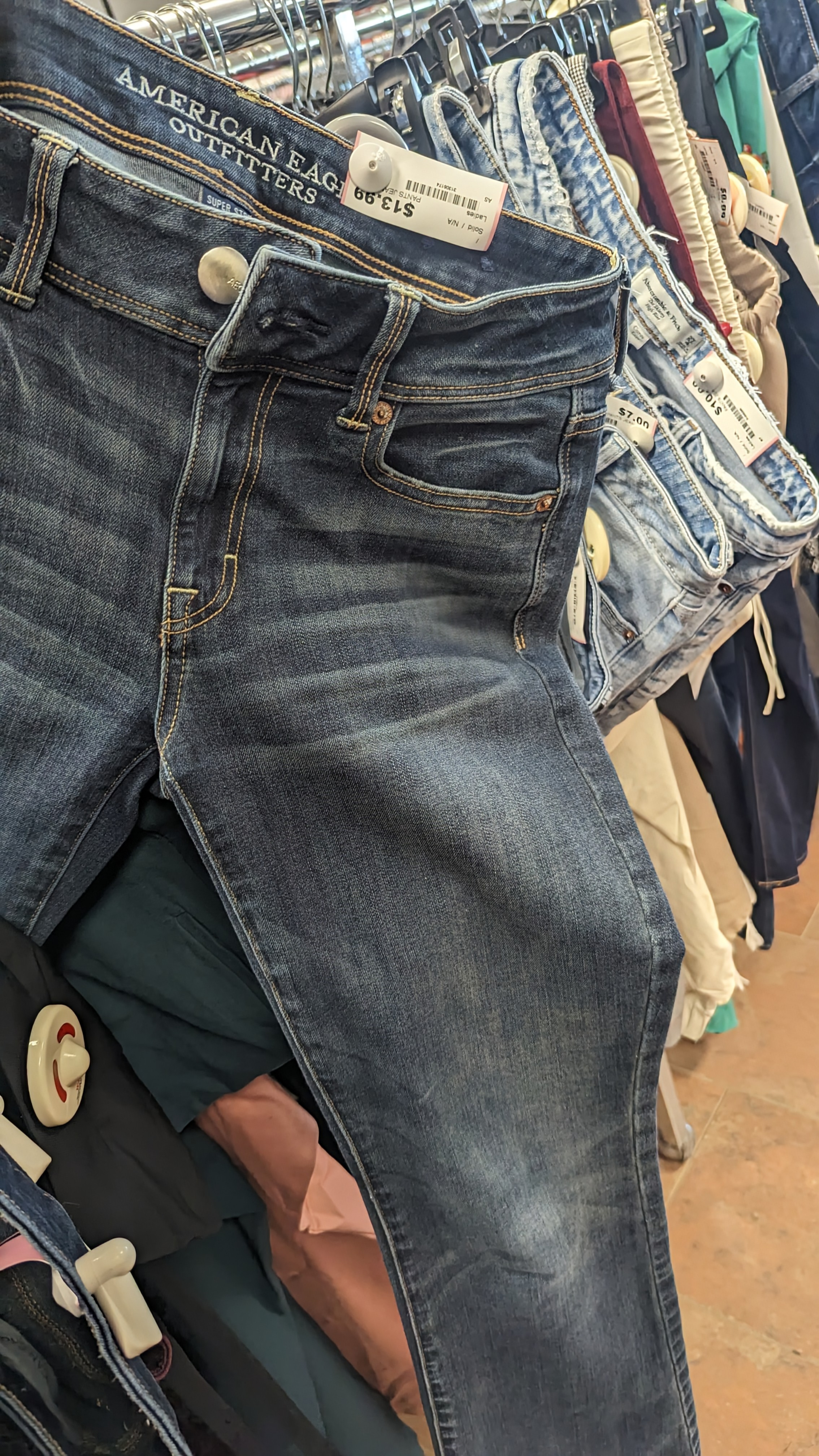
American Eagle Outfitters jeans for sale at a thrift store

A reseller is a company or individual (merchant) that purchases goods or services with the intention of selling them for profit rather than consuming or using them. Resale can be seen in everyday life from yard sales to selling used cars.

Reselling creates a circulation of products, which extends the lifespan of products and reduces the amount of waste in landfills; a used clothing purchased over a new one saves an average about 1 kg of waste, 22 kg of CO_{2}, and 3,040 liters of water. In 2023 the apparel resale market in the US reached approximately $193.7 billion.

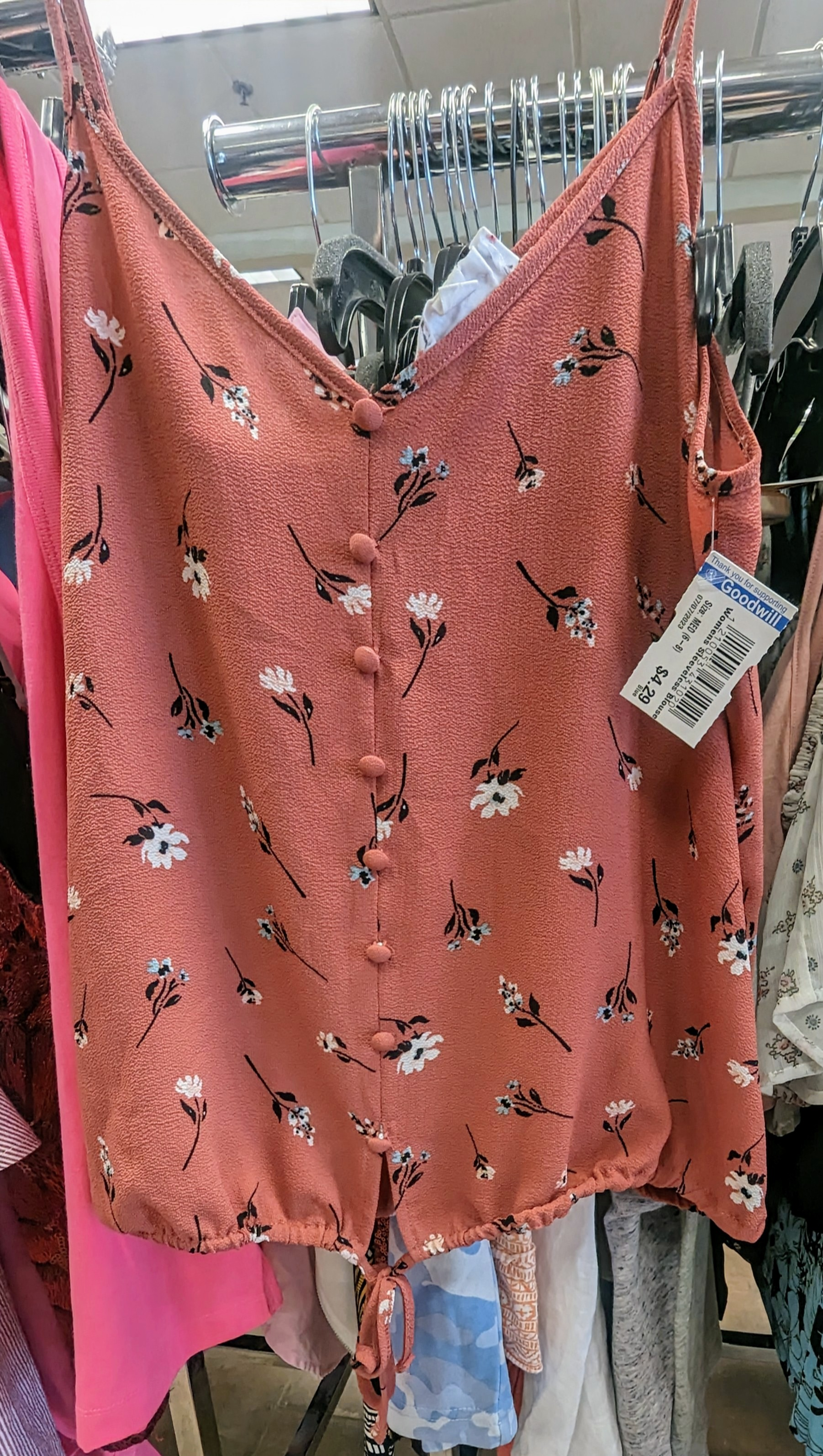
Women's blouse at a Goodwill

== Thrift stores ==
Dating back to the Middle Ages, trading of secondhand clothing continues in the 21st century. Examples of thrifting organizations include The Salvation Army and Goodwill.

== Online resellers ==
The RealReal, Vestiaire Collective, Hewi, Collector Square, Depop, eBay, StockX, Chrono24, and Dotte are active in the online reselling market.

== Software and telecommunications ==
In telecommunications, companies buy excess amounts of transmission capacity or call time from other carriers and resell it to smaller carriers. A software reseller is a consultant who sells the software from large companies under a licence, having no legal employment status with the parent company and generally operating on a freelance basis. Software resellers work with small and medium enterprises (SMEs), local businesses and niche operators. This benefits the software house as they may not hold the resources for the legwork needed to spread their network on a lower scale. While it benefits the reseller because they can build up networks of smaller clients and become a single point of contact for them for every aspect concerned with the software, be it advice, training or updating.

== See also ==
- Value-added reseller
- Price discrimination
- First-sale doctrine
- Recommerce
- Ticket resale
