= Veepee =

French online marketplace

- Formerly: Vente-Privée (2001–2019)
- Type: Private
- Industry: E-commerce
- Founded: January 30, 2001; 25 years ago
- Founders: Jacques-Antoine Granjon; Mickaël Benabou; Julien Sorbac
- Headquarters: La Plaine Saint-Denis, France
- Area served: Austria; Belgium; Brazil; France; Germany; Italy; Netherlands; Spain; Switzerland
- Key people: Jacques-Antoine Granjon (CEO)
- Services: Online marketplace
- Revenue: €3.2 billion (2023)
- Number of employees: 5.000 (2023)
- Website: www.veepee.com

Veepee (formerly vente-privee.com until January 2019) is a French e-commerce company specializing in flash sales of discounted products from third-party brands. Founded in 2001, it offers products in categories including fashion, accessories, toys, watches, home appliances, sports equipment, technology, wine, travel and entertainment.

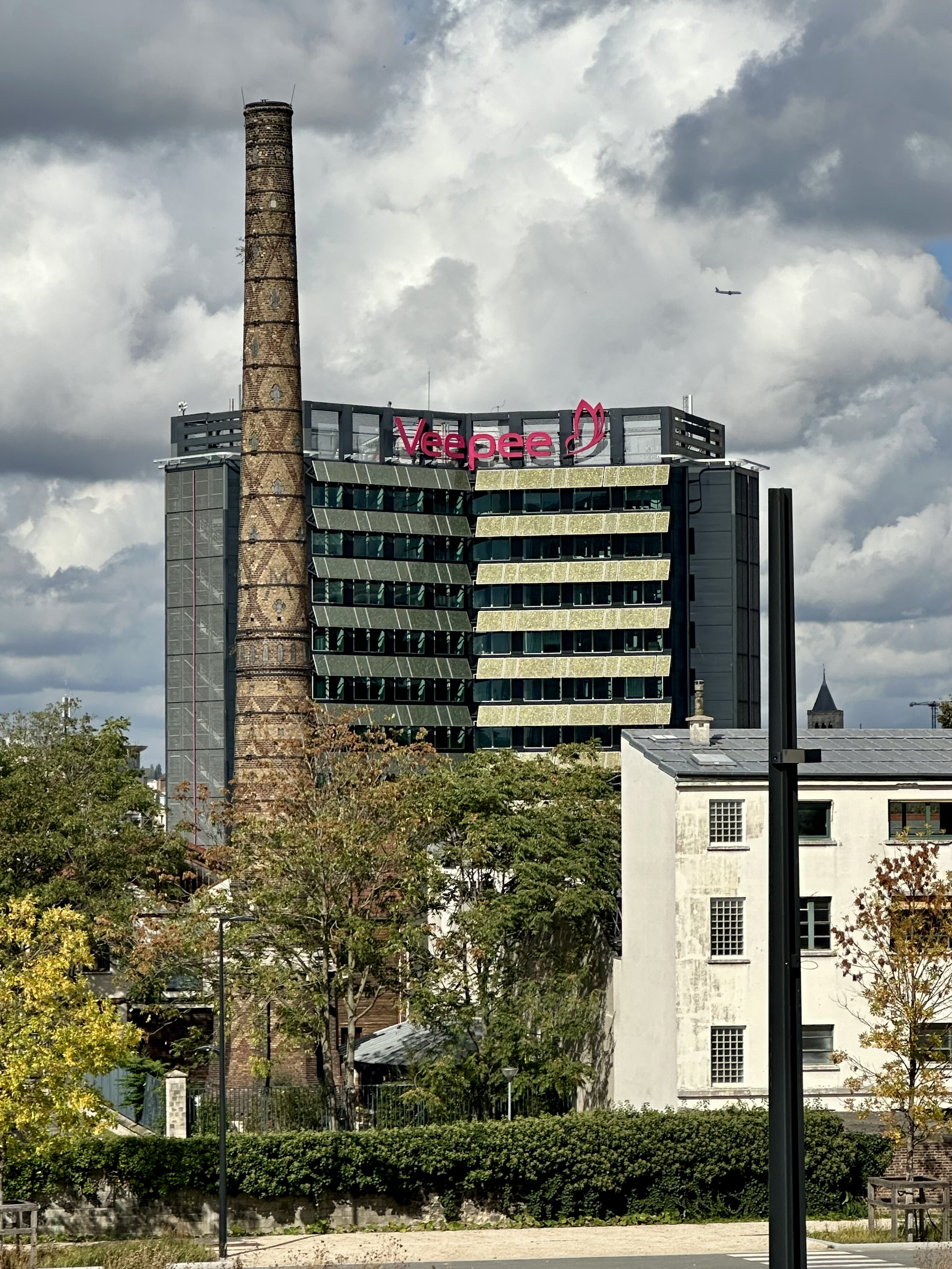
Veepee Tower in Saint-Denis

== History ==
Vente-privee.com was founded in 2001 by Jacques-Antoine Granjon and seven business partners.

At the end of 2000, Granjon and his associates began developing the concept of selling end-of-season and overstock inventory through members-only, limited-time online sales. The aim was to help suppliers quickly sell excess inventory without harming their brand image or competing with traditional distribution channels.

In 2006, the company began expanding internationally by establishing subsidiaries in several European markets. On 26 July 2007, Summit Partners acquired a 20% stake in the company. The investment supported its expansion into Spain, Germany, Italy, the United Kingdom, Belgium, Austria and the Netherlands. Until 2009, new members could join only by invitation from an existing member.

In late 2011, Vente-privee launched a joint venture with American Express in the United States. The venture was discontinued at the end of 2014.

Beginning in 2016, the company expanded through acquisitions, including Vente-Exclusive in the Benelux countries, Privalia in Spain, Italy, Brazil and Mexico, Eboutic.ch in Switzerland, Designers & Friends in Denmark, and Złote Wyprzedaże in Poland.

In 2017, Veepee announced an €80 million investment in research and development, including the launch of the Veepee Impulse startup accelerator at Station F, the establishment of innovation laboratories in partnership with Epitech and 42, and the recruitment of 250 IT employees.

In January 2019, the company announced its rebranding to Veepee, adopting the new name across its European markets.

In 2019, Veepee sold Privalia México to Grupo Axo, while continuing to operate in Brazil under the Privalia brand. In November, the company closed its consumer e-commerce business in the United Kingdom due to uncertainty surrounding Brexit.

== Entertainment ==
In 2012, the company exclusively launched the album Après by Iggy Pop through its platform.

Since 2014, vente-privee completed the successive acquisitions of three theaters (Théâtre de Paris, Théâtre de la Michodière, Théâtre des Bouffes Parisiens). In June 2017, vente-privee continued its diversification strategy by launching a new platform offering multi-theme tickets at reduced prices: panda-ticket.com.
