= Jacques-Antoine Granjon =

French entrepreneur (born 1962)

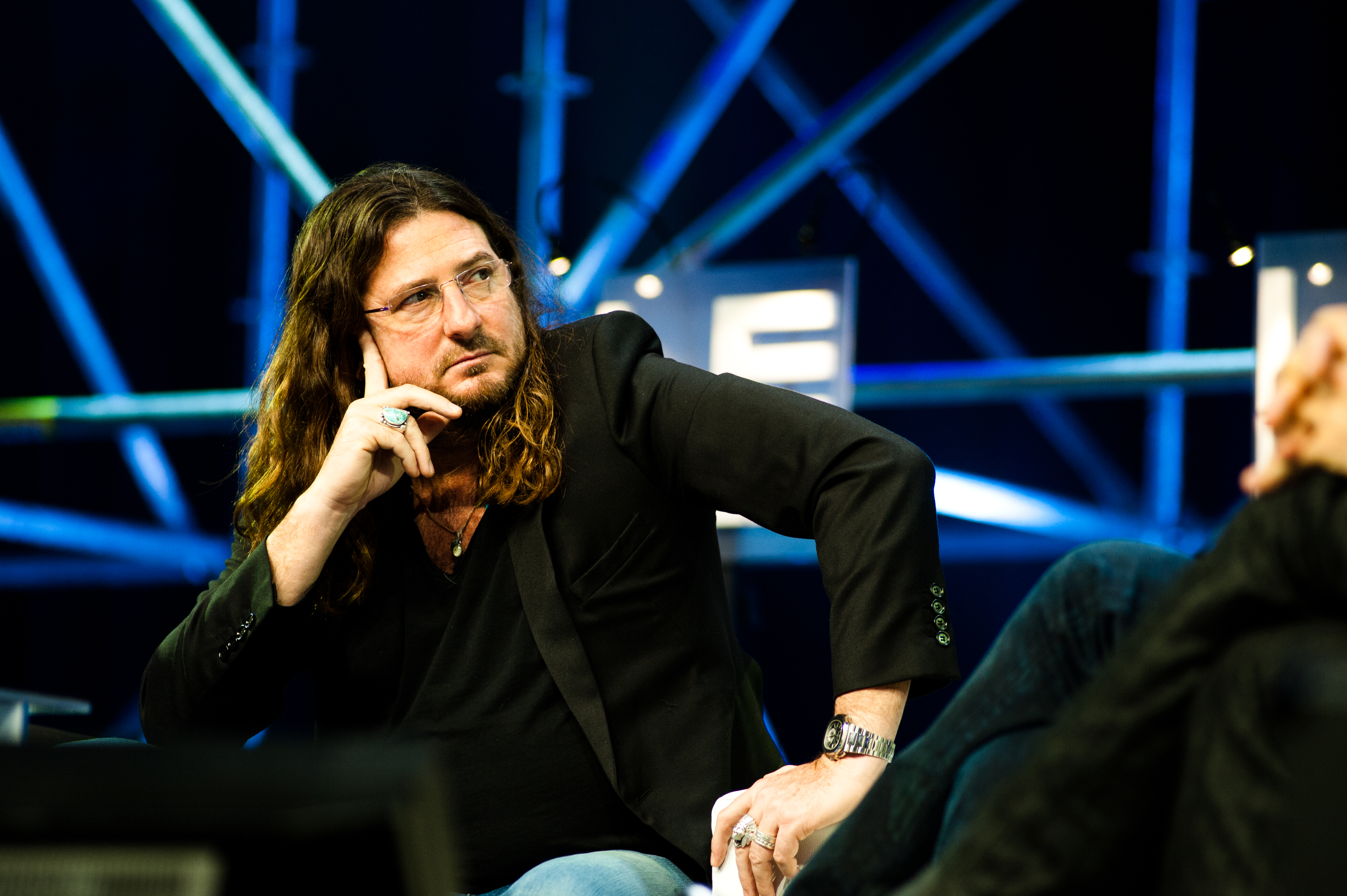
- Born: 9 August 1962 (age 64); Marseille, France
- Education: European Business School
- Occupation: Businessman
- Known for: Founding Veepee
- Children: 3

Jacques-Antoine Granjon (born 9 August 1962) in Marseille (France) is a French billionaire businessman and CEO of Veepee.

As of July 2026, his net worth is estimated at €1.3bn.

== Biography ==
=== Education ===
Granjon completed his education at the European Business School (EBS) and lycée Saint-Louis-de-Gonzague in Paris.

=== Career ===
Early in his career, Granjon, along with his friend Julien Sorbac from European Business School, established Cofotex, a company specializing in the wholesale of overstocked goods. In 1996, he purchased the old printing houses of the French newspaper Le Monde in Plaine-Saint-Denis to serve as the company's headquarters. Cofotex eventually became part of Veepee.

In 2000, inspired by emerging technologies and his expertise in clearance, Granjon developed a visual concept to transform the way end-of-season items were sold. Together with his seven associates, he launched vente-privee.com in France in January 2001. The company quickly grew and had more than 2,100 employees and revenues of 1.6 billion euros by 2013.

In addition to his success with vente-privee.com, Granjon co-founded the École européenne des métiers de l'Internet (EEMI) in 2011, alongside Xavier Niel, Marc Simoncini, and Alain Malvoisin. EEMI is an institution dedicated to providing education and training in internet-related fields.

== Personal life ==
Granjon is known for his laid-back style and outspoken personality. His signature long hair and casual demeanor reflect his unconventional approach to business and life, which has contributed to his success as an entrepreneur. Granjon has been quoted saying, "Better to have hair that is long and clean than short and dirty," exemplifying his unique perspective and individuality.

In his personal life, Granjon has three children from his first marriage. He has since remarried.
