= Louis Vaudable =

French restaurateur (1902–1983)

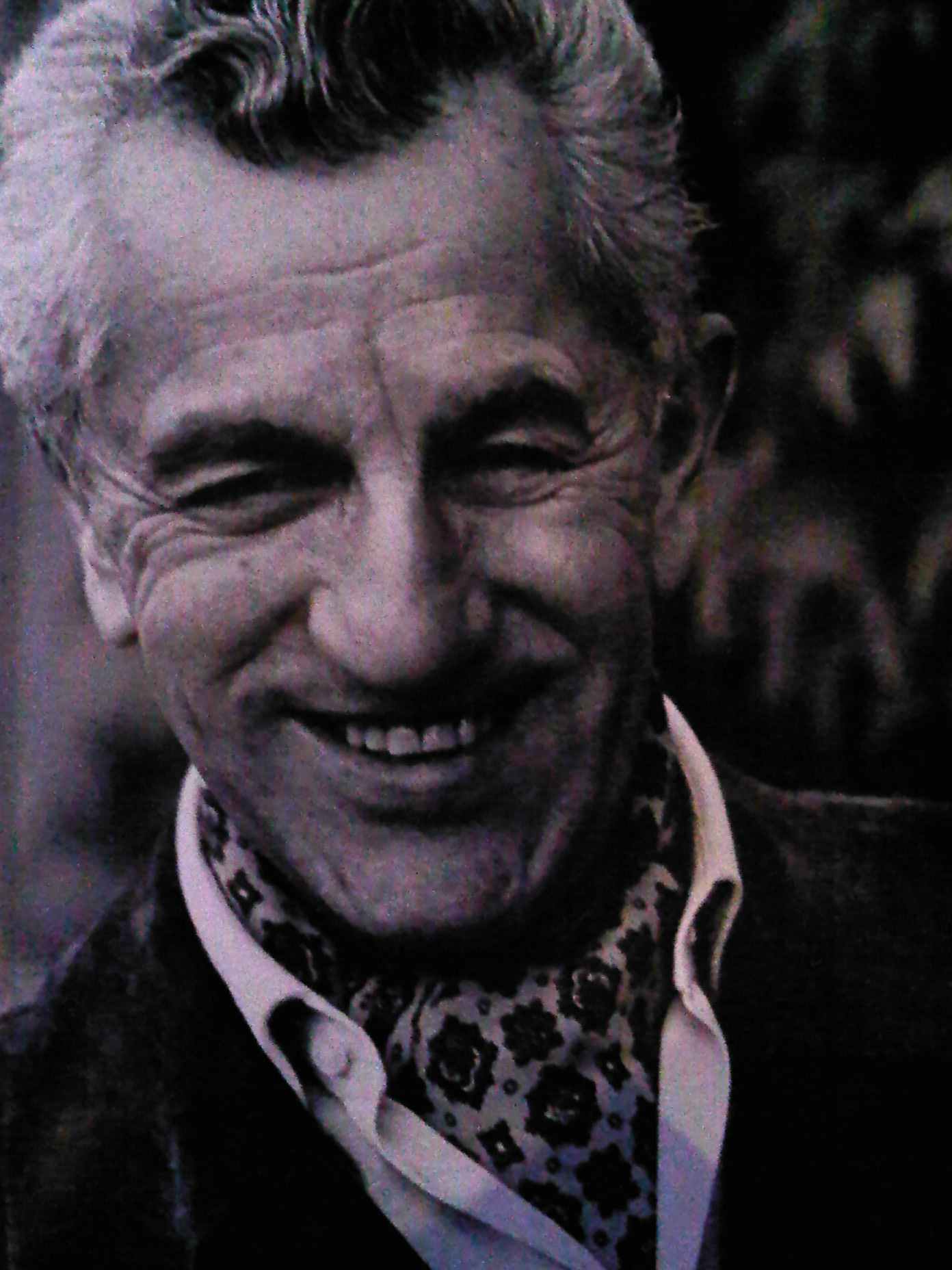
Louis Vaudable

Louis Jules Annet Vaudable (French pronunciation: [lwi vodabl]; 25 August 1902 – 29 April 1983) was a French restaurateur, known for having been the owner of the former most famous restaurant in the world, Maxim's.

== Biography ==
He was the son of Octave Vaudable, a restaurateur from Auvergne and owner of the restaurant Noël Peters, who bought Maxim's in 1932. With three generations of restaurateurs, the Vaudable family is one of the most important figures in the restaurant business.

After graduating from HEC Paris in 1923, Louis interned in hotels throughout Europe and the US like Hôtel Esplanade in Berlin or Hôtel Bristol in Vienna before studying Haute Cuisine for three years.

Thanks to its quality of food and service, Maxim's, during the Vaudable era, was considered the best restaurant in the world and world-wide celebrities from Brigitte Bardot to Aristotle Onassis would make it their restaurant of choice.

Louis Vaudable's son, François, who assisted his father for years, sold Maxim's to Pierre Cardin in 1981.

François Vaudable now lives in Paris and is married to an American. He has two daughters.

Louis Vaudable was also:

- Co-owner of the restaurant Le Grand Véfour
- Owner of the Eiffel Tower's restaurants: Le Jules Verne and La Belle Époque
- Administrator of the Maxim's Ltd company, from 1932 to 1957, and general director of Les Cuisines Maxim's company from 1951 to 1972
- Manager of Les caves Maxim's company (wine exportation) from 1948
- President of Air Maxim's Orly-Ouest
- Administrator of Air Maxim's International
- Advisor for the French Foreign Trade from 1932 to 1939 and from 1963 to 1971
- Honorary advisor from 1971 to 1980
- Officer of the French Legion of Honor, officer of the French National Order of Merit, medal of vermeil of the city of Paris, and was designed in 1978 as "Personality of the year for gastronomy".
