= Maxim's =

Restaurant in Paris, France

Coordinates: 48°52′2.3″N 02°19′20″E

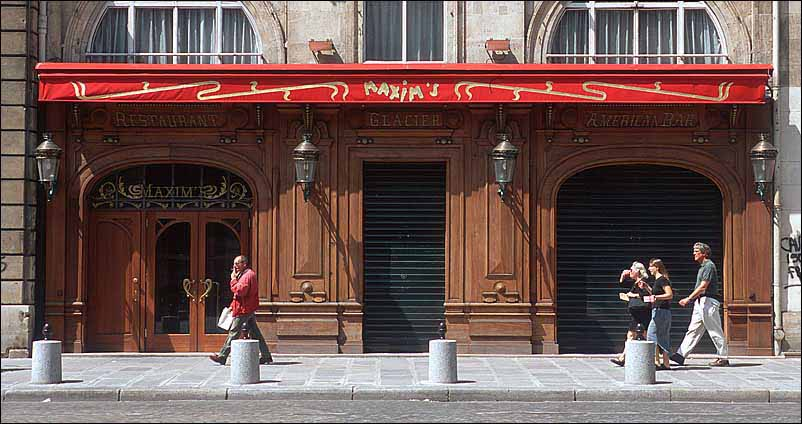
Maxim's

Maxim's (French pronunciation: [maksim‿s]) is a restaurant in Paris, France, located at No. 3 Rue Royale in the 8th arrondissement. It is known for its Art Nouveau interior decor. In the mid 20th century, Maxim's was regarded as the most famous restaurant in the world.

== History ==
=== Early history ===
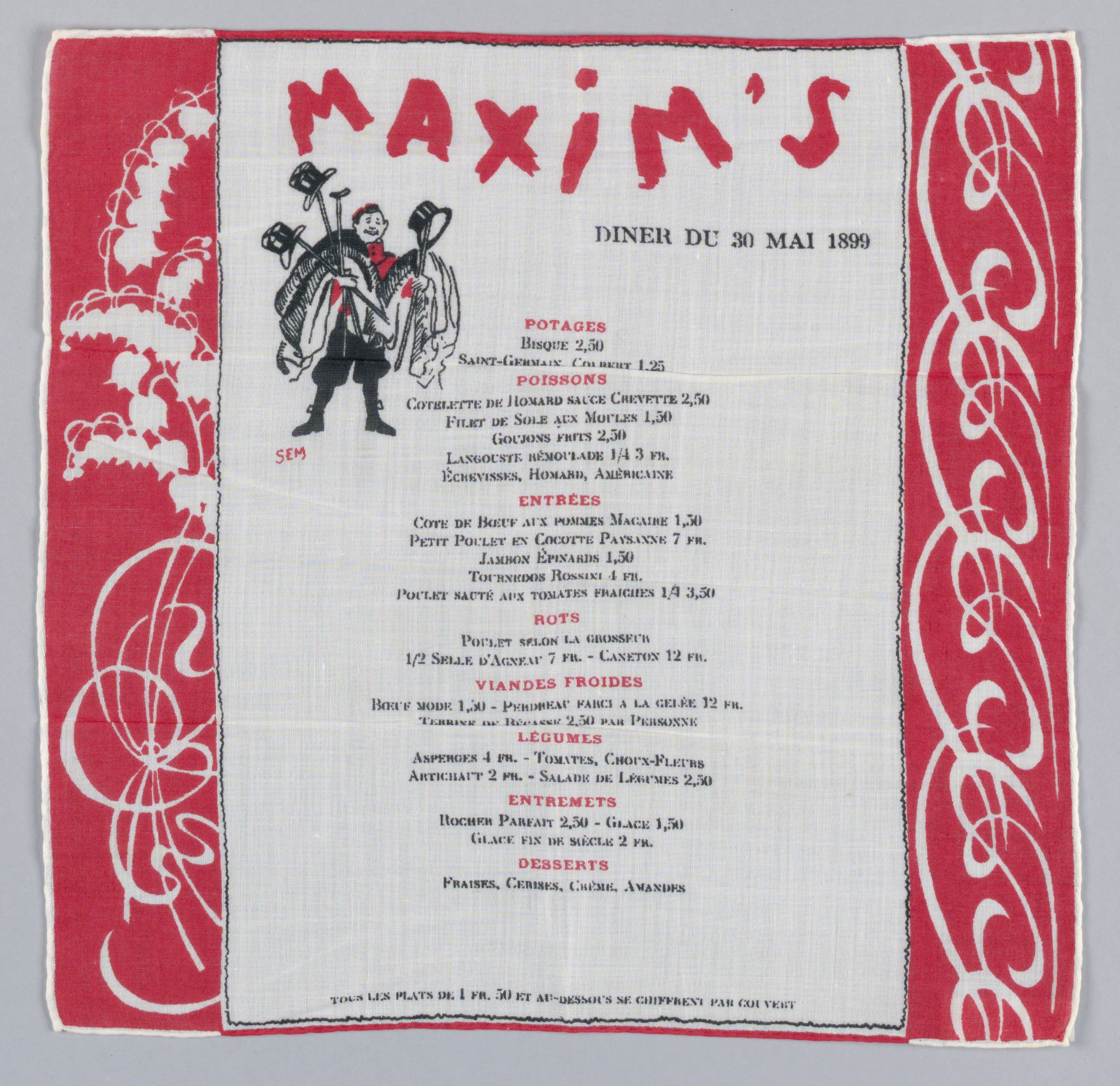
An 1899 menu, printed on a handkerchief

Maxim's was founded as a bistro in 1893 by Maxime Gaillard, formerly a waiter, at 3 Rue Royale in Paris. The location had previously been an ice-cream parlor. In 1899, it was given the decor it became known for, in preparation for the 1900 Paris Exposition. Ceilings were done in stained-glass, and there are murals of nymphs. In that era, it became known as a "place to take ladies but never one's wife," as said in Franz Lehar's music about the location. At the end of the 19th century, in la belle époque, Maxim's "became the social and culinary centre of Paris."

It became one of the most popular and fashionable restaurants in Paris under its next owner, Eugene Cornuché. He gave the dining room its Art Nouveau decor, installed a piano, and made sure that it was always filled with beautiful women. Cornuché was accustomed to say: "An empty room... Never! I always have a beauty sitting by the window, in view from the sidewalk." It was so famous that the third act of Franz Lehár's 1905 operetta The Merry Widow was set there.

In 1913, Jean Cocteau said of Maxim's clientele: "It was an accumulation of velvet, lace, ribbons, diamonds and what all else I couldn't describe. To undress one of these women is like an outing that calls for three weeks' advance notice, it's like moving house."

After the restaurant fell on hard times, in 1932, Octave Vaudable, owner of the restaurant Noel Peters, bought Maxim's. He started selecting his clients, favouring the regulars, preferably famous or rich, beginning a new era of prestigious catering under the Vaudable family which lasted more than half a century. Famous guests of the 1930s included Edward VIII, Josephine Baker and Jean Cocteau, a close friend and neighbour of the Vaudables. The playwright Georges Feydeau wrote a popular comedy called La Dame de chez Maxim ("The Lady from Maxim's").

=== World War II and mid-20th century ===
In the course of the German occupation of Paris during World War II, Otto Horcher was installed as the manager of the restaurant, with the restaurant itself remaining in business. Maxim's was the most popular Parisian restaurant of the German high command and collaborationist celebrities. Hermann Göring, Otto Abetz, and Ernst Jünger favoured Maxim's when in Paris. Due to the support of officials, Maxim's enjoyed protected status during the occupation: its employees were not deported and it was exempt from food restrictions. It was closed by the French resistance after the liberation of Paris, reopening in September 1946.

After the war, the Vaudables restored the restaurant and began expanding internationally as well, with the restaurants in Istanbul, Chicago, Tokyo and Mexico City using Maxim's name but operating under different management. In 1949, the Peacock Grill opened in Houston, and then was renamed Maxim's, with design based on Maxim's de Paris. In the late 1950s, Pan Am had Maxim's de Paris food catered in-flight, including their famous beef entree, as the Boeing 377 Stratocruisers "had their own ovens, and there was usually a beef tenderloin cooked on board and sliced in front of you."

Maxim's was also immensely popular with the international celebrities of the 1950s, with guests such as Aristotle Onassis, Maria Callas, the Duke of Windsor and his wife Wallis Simpson, Porfirio Rubirosa, Max Ophüls, and Barbara Hutton.

When the restaurant was renovated at the end of the 1950s, workmen discovered a treasure trove of lost coins and jewelry that had slipped out of the pockets of the wealthy and been trapped between the cushions of the banquettes.

In 1956, the fame of the restaurant led to its becoming the namesake for a Western-inspired restaurant in Hong Kong, Maxim's Boulevard. The restaurant achieved rapid success and eventually developed into the conglomerate Maxim's Caterers, the largest catering corporation in Hong Kong by revenue and market share, and one of the largest in all of East Asia.

In the 1960s, Maxim's Restaurant at Orly Airport in France opened. Maxim's: The Nancy Goldberg International Center in Chicago went up for bids in 2013, after opening in 1963 as a replica of Maxim's Paris as well. The Chicago Maxim's de Paris was sold in 2022 from the City of Chicago, to local residents Victoria and Adam Bilter, to have the interior restored and re-opened as a private members social-club.

Brigitte Bardot caused a scandal when she entered the restaurant barefoot. Jean Paul Gaultier recalled that Pierre Cardin was rejected from Maxim's de Paris due to the dress code, creating "a huge scandal," when he wore a turtleneck instead of a dress shirt and bow tie. Other guests of this time period were Jeanne Moreau, Barbra Streisand, Kiri Te Kanawa, John Travolta and Sylvie Vartan. It was during the fifties, sixties and seventies that Maxim's, under the management of Octave Vaudable's son, Louis Vaudable, became the most famous restaurant in the world and one of the most expensive. With his wife Magguy (Maggie), Louis Vaudable assured Maxim's international reputation.

François Vaudable, who had been directing the restaurant by his father Louis's side for years, pursued the work of his family which gave Maxim's its era of glory.

=== International expansion and Cardin Enterprises ===
In the early 1970s, De Gaulle Airport opened, and the holding company Air Maxim's International was created to manage all the restaurants at the airport. It also began managing two airport restaurants at Lyon and Marseille, and also expanded into catering on trains and in department stores and the management of two hotels.

In 1971, Maxim's closed briefly while it was providing food and wine for the 2,500-year celebration of the Persian Empire. 600 guests dined over five and a half hours in the longest and most lavish official banquet in modern history as recorded in successive editions of the Guinness Book of World Records.

Cardin Enterprises began lending their name to the owners, Louis and Maggie Vaudable, in 1978. The Maxim's brand was extended to a wide range of goods and services. In 1981, Maxim's Boutiques sold around 900 items made or purchase by Cardin, but all sold under Maxim's label, including a line of men's evening wear. Friday night was still black-tie night at the restaurant itself. Other items included table linens, china, glassware, furniture and flowers, in around 200 boutiques in France.

In 1981, Air Maxim's International was grossing over $50 million annually, mostly from licensing fees. When the Michelin Guide, which had awarded Maxim's three stars for years, were rumored to be considering reducing the number to two, Vaudable says they "demanded a special symbol because we're not a restaurant like others. When the Michelin refused, I asked that we be dropped." According to The New York Times, the feud did not affect the popularity of the restaurant, with reservations still required a day in advance and a "hierarchical seating system" controlled by the restaurant's director.

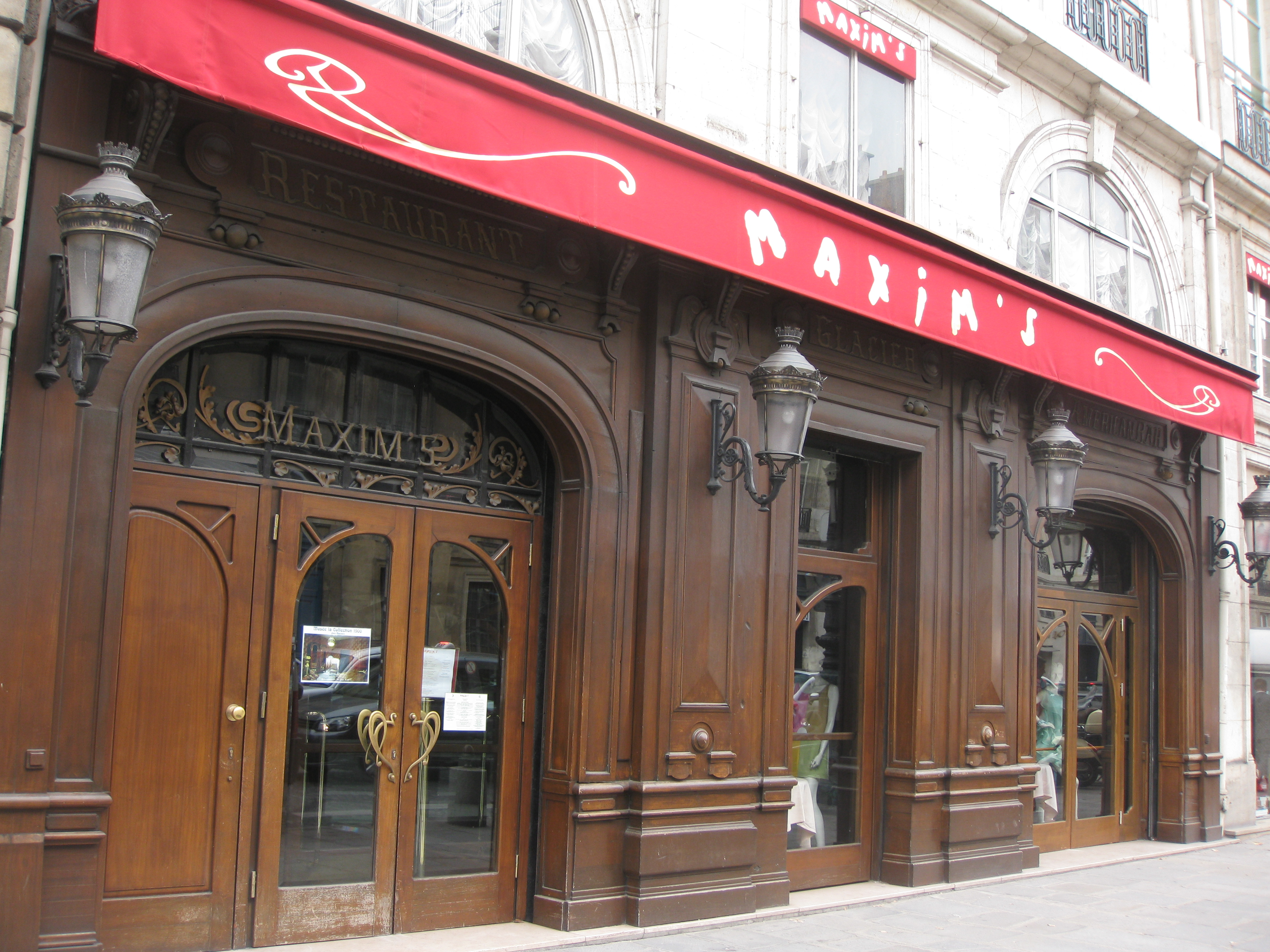
Façade in 2012

In 1981, the French Government declared the restaurant's Art Nouveau interior a historic monument. The same year, upset at the idea of its falling into foreign hands, the Vaudables offered to sell Maxim's to fashion designer Pierre Cardin. Cardin Enterprises purchased it in May 1981 for an undisclosed price, said to be in excess of US$20 million. Louis and Francois Vaudable were expected to train a successor chosen by Cardin and then leave the business, with decor and ambiance expected to remain the same. Under Cardin's management, an Art Nouveau museum was later created on three floors of the building and a cabaret was established, which Cardin filled each night with songs from the beginning of the 20th century.

The chefs who worked at Maxim's included a young Wolfgang Puck.

Beijing was Maxim's first outlet, and was located on the second floor of the Chongwenmen Hotel, an affiliate of Beijing Tourism Group, owned by the government of China. The Chinese state owned 51% of Beijing Maxim's, while Maxim's held 49%. For the location, material was imported from Italy and France, and craftspeople were brought in from Japan, with total decorations costing $3.5 million. When it opened, authorities did require some of the naked figures be covered with curtains. A former Maxim's employee stated around 70% to 80% of the customers at Beijing Maxim's were from embassies and American and French tourist groups. Chinese nationals increasingly became the main customers at the Beijing restaurant by 1993.

A New York location was opened in 1985, after two years in development. The restaurant posted a loss in its first year, and was closed after seven years. Around 1985, the restaurants in Brussels and Rio de Janeiro were scuttled over management issues, and the Palm Springs hotel, opened in February 1986, also encountered occupancy issues.

The press noted criticism by food critics for Cardin's apparent focus on Maxim's as a franchisable trademark, with food quality not commensurable with price. The Club des Cent (club of 100) moved its general assembly to another restaurant. Cardin had a Maxim's boutique, selling evening clothes, and Maxim's Minim's at the Paris location selling gourmet snacks within blocks of the restaurant.

Pierre Cardin died in 2020. By 2023, Maxim's was open mainly for private events. In March 2023, Laurent de Gourcuff, CEO of Paris Society, announced that his company had been selected to revive the restaurant, and that a cocktail bar and terrace would be created on the upper floors. Daily bookings resumed in November 2023.

== In media ==
- Maxim's was featured in Franz Lehár's 1905 operetta, The Merry Widow.
- It was mentioned in the 1937 Jean Renoir film, La Grande Illusion.
- The 1958 musical film Gigi was filmed on location at Maxim's, with two scenes there.
- It was mentioned in the 1962 episode of The Saint "The Covetous Headsman".
- It was mentioned in the 1966 episode of I Dream of Jeannie "My Master, the Thief".
- Maxim's was mentioned in multiple episodes of Bewitched, including: "The Joker is a Card," "Daddy Comes to Visit," "Serena Stops the Show," and "Paris, Witches Style".
- In the first episode of the 1978 series of the Morecambe and Wise Show, some scenes play in a replica of Maxim's.
- Maxim's was mentioned in the Ivor Novello song "and her mother came too".
- Maxim's was mentioned in the 1982 Top 40 song "I Predict", by Sparks.
- It was featured in the 2011 Woody Allen film Midnight in Paris.
- It appears in a scene from the movie Sidney Sheldon's Bloodline, featuring Audrey Hepburn and Ben Gazzara.
- In the 1966 film How to Steal a Million, some scenes play in Maxim's.
- In the 1967 film The Night of the Generals, Peter O'Toole, playing a Nazi officer during World War II, visits Maxim's. He calls it "an adequate restaurant, very clean".
- The sign for the Maxim Restaurant shows up multiple times in background shots of the anime series Lupin the Third Part II and the establishment is further mentioned verbally in several episodes as a place Lupin and Jigen frequent.
- In the 2012 film Hitchcock, Alma Hitchcock tells her husband Alfred that there will be no more shipments from Maxim's Of Paris, as they are financing Psycho themselves.

== See also ==
- Maxim's Art Nouveau "Collection 1900"
