= Vestiaire Collective =

Online retailer of used luxury goods

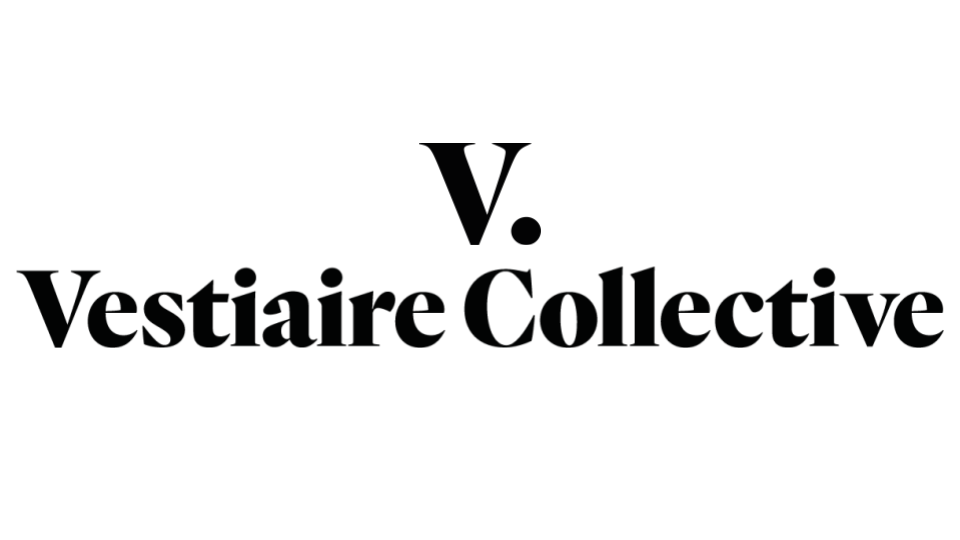
- Type: Public limited company with a board of directors (n.o.s.)
- Industry: Recommerce, Fashion
- Founded: 2009
- Founder: Sébastien Fabre, Christian Jorge, Fanny Moizant, Sophie Hersan, Henrique Fernandes, Alexandre Cognard
- Headquarters: 53 rue de Châteaudun, 75009, Paris, France
- Key people: Bernard Osta (CEO), Sophie Hersan (Co-founder & Fashion Director)
- Products: Pre-loved fashion and luxury items including clothing, footwear, accessories, and jewelry
- Services: Authentication, C2C Marketplace, B2C Marketplace, Consignment, Resale as a Service (RaaS)
- Number of employees: ~600
- Website: https://www.vestiairecollective.com

Vestiaire Collective
- Operating system: iOS, Android
- Size: 198.1 MB (iOS) (as of October, 20th 2025)
- Available in: English, French, German, Italian, Spanish, Swedish, Dutch, Korean, Traditional Chinese
- Website: vestiairecollective.com

Vestiaire Collective is a global platform for buying and selling pre-owned luxury and designer fashion. The platform connects buyers and sellers of secondhand luxury and designer items, with listings digitally verified and curated by an internal team supported by AI. Buyers can choose physical authentication through international hubs or opt for direct shipping. In 2020, Vestiaire Collective was recognized as the 11th French Unicorn part of the French Tech Next 40/120 list.

== History ==
Vestiaire Collective was founded in 2009 as "Vestiaire de Copines" by Fanny Moizant, Sophie Hersan, Sébastien Fabre, Alexandre Cognard, Henrique Fernandes, and Christian Jorge. The platform launched with 3,000 pre-owned fashion items sourced from friends and family. In 2012, the company rebranded to "Vestiaire Collective".

Vestiaire Collective started operations in the United Kingdom in 2012, followed by its expansion into the United States in 2014. The company continued its international growth, reaching various European markets in 2015 and further expanding to Hong Kong, Singapore, and Australia by 2017. Vestiaire Collective operates in over 70 countries worldwide. In 2022, Vestiaire Collective acquired Tradesy, a US-based resale company as part of its ongoing development in the North American market.

In 2019, Maximilian Bittner became the Global CEO, with a focus on increasing the company's presence in the US market. In October 2025, Bernard Osta, who had been serving as Chief Financial Officer, was appointed CEO of Vestiaire Collective, succeeding Maximilian Bittner. In January 2026, co-founder Fanny Moizant announced her departure from the company.

== Funding ==
The company has secured investment from a range of institutional investors and venture capital firms, including fashion conglomerate Kering, Tiger Global Management, media company Condé Nast, and SoftBank Group and Generation Investment Management (co-founded by former U.S. Vice President Al Gore). Other notable backers include Eurazeo, Fidelity International, Korelya Capital, Luxury Tech Fund, Cuir Invest, Vitruvian Partners, and Bpifrance.

In February 2024, the company has raised capital through equity crowdfunding platform Crowdcube, in which Vestiaire Collective raised approximately €3.5 million, exceeding its initial objective by more than three times.

== Business Operations ==
=== Services (C2C, B2C, VIP, RaaS) ===
Vestiaire Collective primarily operates a consumer-to-consumer (C2C) platform connecting buyers and sellers of pre-owned luxury fashion items. Sellers list items by uploading photographs, with listings digitally verified through AI technology and reviewed by the company's curation teams. Buyers can select physical authentication through one of four international authentication centers or opt for direct shipping.

==== Resale as a Service ====
Vestiaire Collective operates an "Official Partners" program, partnering with luxury brands and retailers to facilitate resale. As of 2025, the company has established partnerships with over 12 luxury brands, including:

- Courrèges
- Isabel Marant
- Chloé
- Burberry
- GIGLIO.com
- LN-CC
- Alexander McQueen
- Mulberry
- Paco Rabanne
- Mytheresa
- Luisaviaroma
- Magda Butrym
- Ganni
- Zalando

=== Verification of Authenticity ===
Vestiaire Collective's verification process is composed of 4 steps: profile monitoring, digital verification, physical verification and quality control. The company provides automatic physical inspection for all purchases over €1,000 (with a €15 opt-in charge for items under €1,000). Items are verified and quality-checked at one of four regional authentication centers located in Tourcoing (EU), Crawley (UK), Hong Kong (Asia), and Brooklyn (North America). After receiving the purchase, buyers can report authenticity concerns; if a doubt is raised, the item is sent to a regional hub for physical inspection by the authentication team. The company established its own verification training program in 2017, requiring 750 hours of instruction and specialization in a specific category. Vestiaire Collective is a signatory of the French Anti-Counterfeiting Charter (2012) and the European Commission's Memorandum of Understanding to combat online counterfeiting (April 2024)

=== Platform Statistics ===
The platform features around 6 million curated items with approximately 30,000 new items listed daily. Vestiaire Collective operates in over 70 countries with a community of millions of members globally. According to company data, 85% of Vestiaire Collective consumers indicate willingness to buy fewer, higher quality items on the platform.

== Sustainability Initiatives ==
=== Fast Fashion Policy ===
In 2022, Vestiaire Collective announced a three-year plan to ban fast fashion brands from its platform in two phases: 30 brands in 2022 and 33 in 2023. The company collaborated with an expert committee to establish criteria for defining fast fashion based on five factors: low price point (considering repairability), high renewal rate (number of collections per year), wide product range size (items available at any given time), speed to market (production cycle time), and strong promotion intensity (frequency of sales).

=== Environmental Impact ===
According to the company's 2025 Impact Report, purchasing pre-owned items on Vestiaire Collective avoids 90% of the environmental costs associated with buying new items. The report states that 85% of items purchased on the platform prevent a first-hand purchase (displacement rate). The company has committed to reducing carbon emissions in line with the Paris Agreement requirements through Science Based Targets initiative (SBTi) targets. Vestiaire Collective reported reducing both carbon intensity and absolute emissions by 6% in 2023 compared to 2022, and by 2% in 2024. The company's 2025 Impact Report announced the launch of carbon credits, described as a new climate finance tool for the circular fashion industry.

== Leadership ==
=== Chief Executive Officer ===
==== Bernard Osta ====
Bernard Osta is the chief executive officer of Vestiaire Collective. He joined the company in May 2021 as Chief Strategy Officer, was appointed Chief Financial Officer in September 2023, and became chief executive officer in October 2025. Prior to joining Vestiaire Collective, he spent 15 years in investment banking at Lazard and Goldman Sachs in New York and Paris, working on major international transactions. Osta holds a Master of Science in management from HEC Paris. He serves as an independent member of the supervisory board of Vivendi.

== Awards and Recognitions ==
- Received B Corp certification in 2021
- Featured on the French Tech's Next 40/120 list since 2020
- Received the French Qualiweb "Best Digital Customer Relationship of the Year" award (2024) and "Italy's Best Customer Service" (2025/2026), French Qualiweb "Best Digital Customer Relationship” of the Year" award (2026)
- Co-founders featured in the "Make it Iconic" campaign alongside other French public figures (2024).
