= IBS =

IBS most commonly refers to:

- Irritable bowel syndrome, a disorder of the bowel

IBS may also refer to:

== Academia and education ==
- Indiana Boys School, a former name of Plainfield Juvenile Correctional Facility
- Institute for Basic Science, a research institute in Daejeon, South Korea
- Institute of Bangladesh Studies, a research institute in Rajshahi University
- International Bilingual School, a former Japanese private school in the Los Angeles area
- International Biometric Society, an academic statistical association for mathematical and statistical methods in the biosciences
- International Business School, Budapest, a partnership with Oxford Brookes University based in Hungary dating from 1991
- International Business School, Germany, a private institution of post-secondary education located in Nuremberg
- Iowa Braille School
- International Boys' Schools Coalition

== Associations ==
- Institute of Professional Sound, formerly Institute of Broadcast Sound, a UK broadcasting professional association
- Instytut Badań Strukturalnych, the Institute for Structural Research in Warsaw, Poland
- Intercollegiate Broadcasting System, an organization of non-profit, education-affiliated radio stations
- International Bible Society, a former name of Biblica, a group that translates and publishes the Bible
- International Boy Scouts, Troop 1, a historic Boy Scout Group in Japan

== Business ==
- International Builders' Show, an annual trade show organized by the National Association of Home Builders
- Iptor Supply Chain Systems, formerly International Business Systems, a supply chain management company
- Internet Broadcasting, a web design firm focused on broadcast television
- LuckyFM Ibaraki Broadcasting System, a commercial radio station in Ibaraki Prefercture, Japan

== Fiction ==
- IBS, a satirical news channel on the BBC's programme Broken News
- International Brotherhood of Stevedores, a dockworkers union in season two of the TV show The Wire

== Statistics ==
- Integrated Brier score, a statistical rate

== Medical ==
- Irritable bowel syndrome, a disorder of the bowel
- Ichthyosis bullosa of Siemens, a genetic skin disorder

== Science and technology ==
- Ideal Body Size, a component of the figure rating scale
- Identical By State, a genetic term also known as non-identical by type (NIBT)
- Instruction-based sampling, an implementation of a hardware performance counter used to collect performance data in a superscalar microprocessor
- Integrated bridge system, a navigation related system on ships
- Intrabeam scattering, a collective effect arising in high-intensity particle beams
- Ion-beam sputtering, a type of sputter deposition
- Iron-based superconductor
- Israel Broadcasting Service, former (1951–1965) name of the Israel Broadcasting Authority

== Other uses ==
- Isaac Bashevis Singer, a Jewish American novelist
- Iman Budhi Santosa, an Indonesian poet
- Industrialised Building System (IBS), a term used in Malaysia for a technique of construction
