= List of universities and colleges in Hungary =

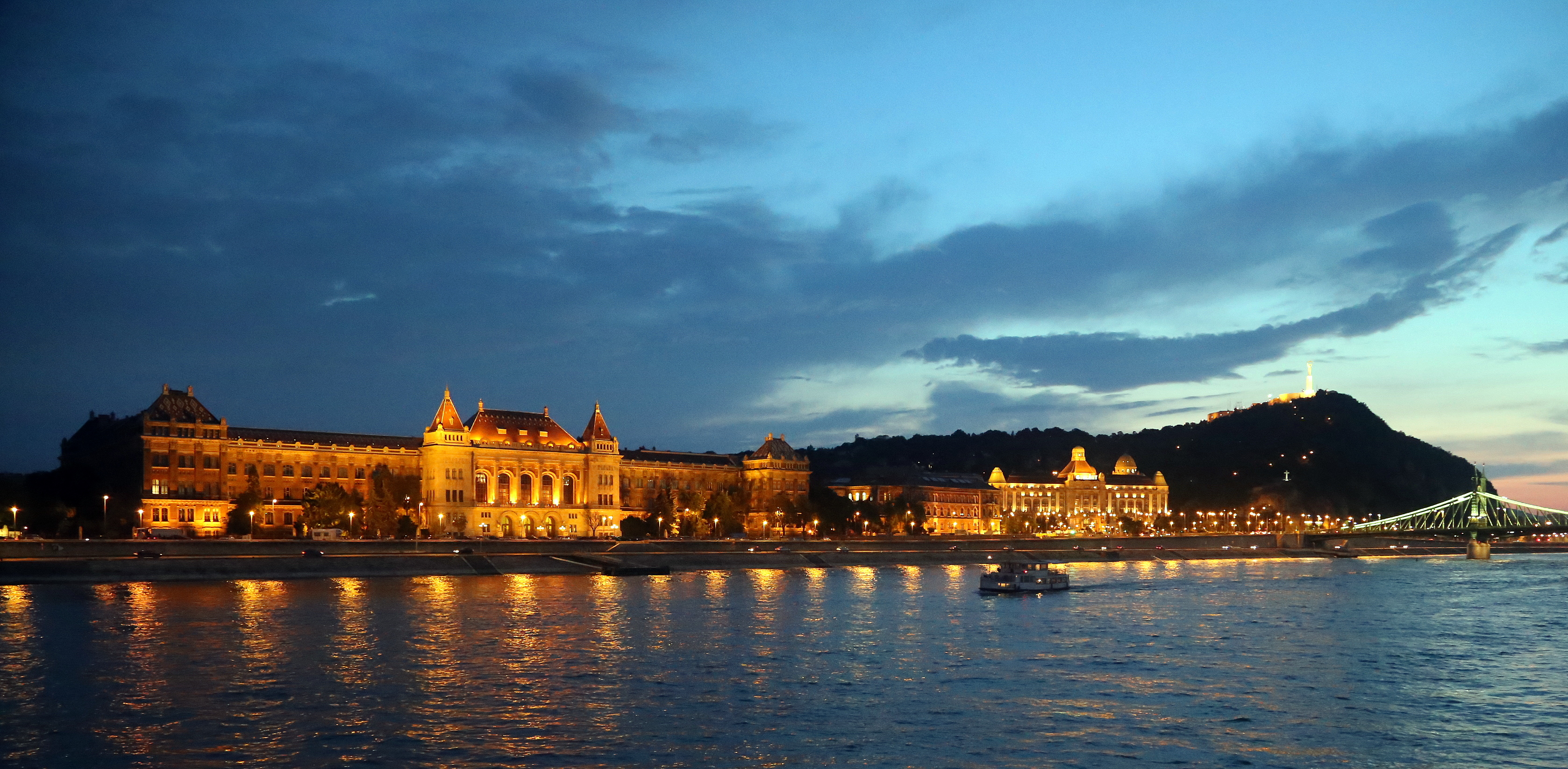
Budapest University of Technology and Economics, oldest institute of technology, founded in 1782

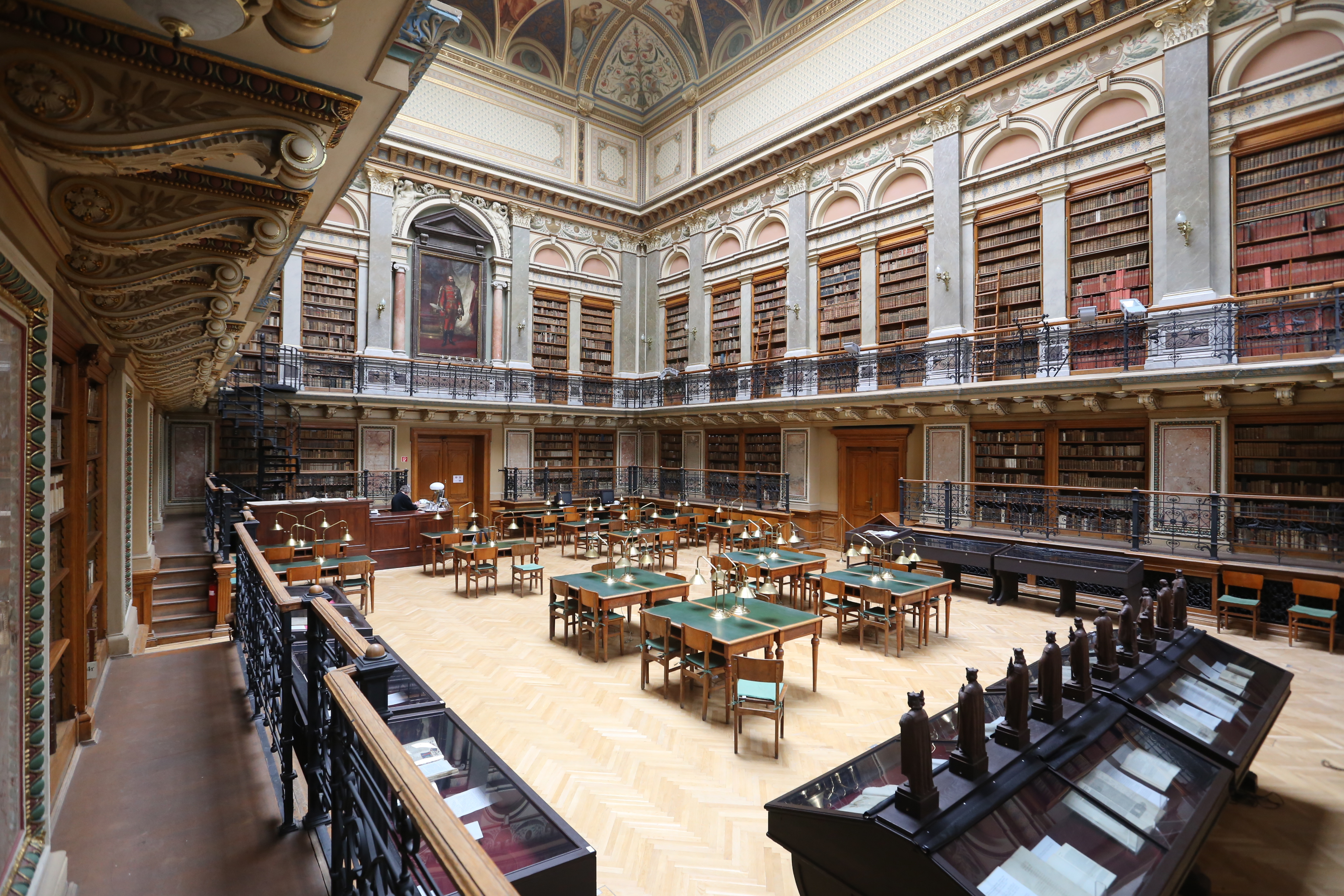
Eötvös Loránd University's university library large reading room

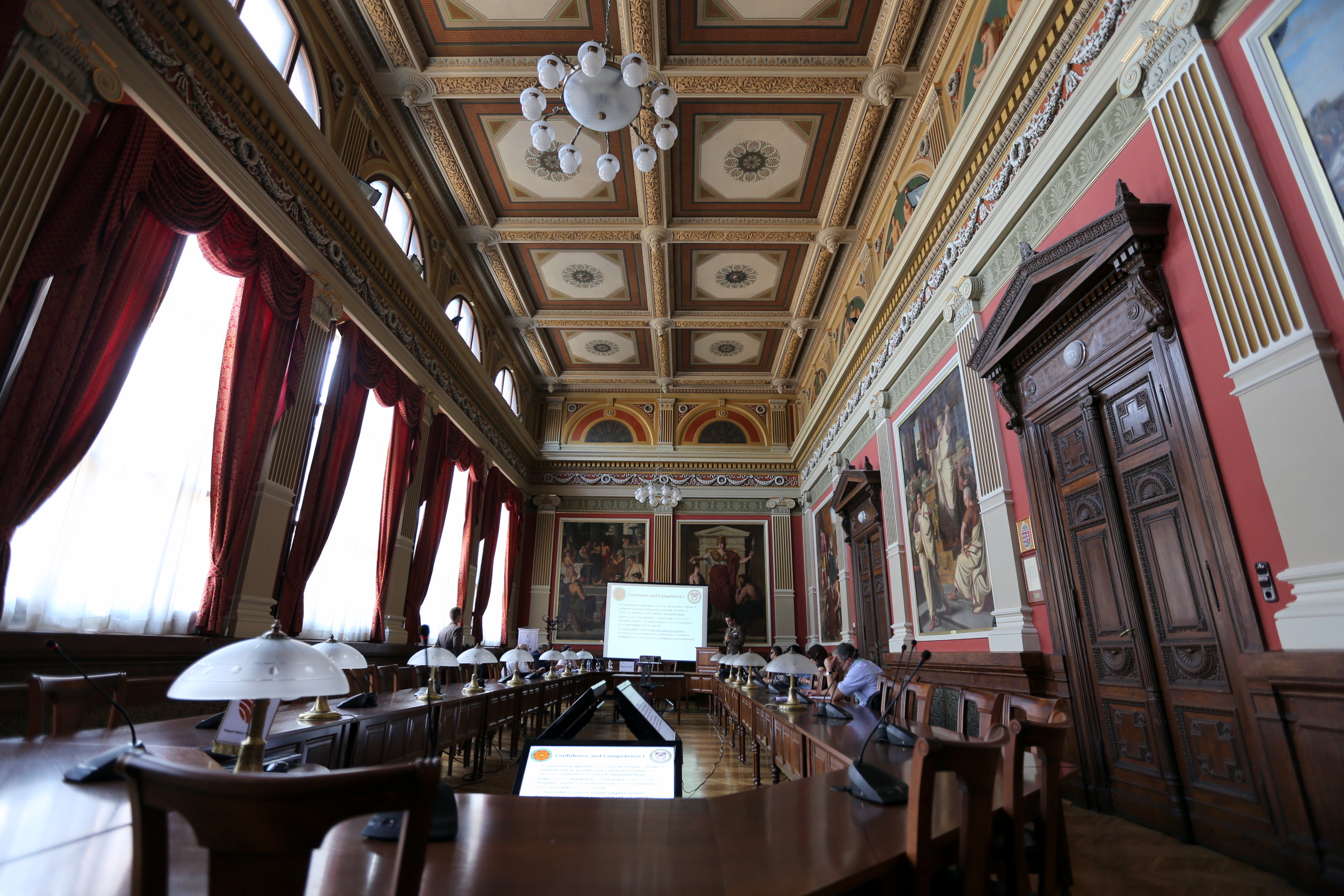
Rector's Council Hall of Budapest University of Economics and Business, the first public business school in the world, founded in 1857

Universities in Hungary have been instituted by Act of Parliament under the Higher Education Act. For new public universities and private universities, approval is required from the Ministry of responsible for the education and later from the Hungarian National Assembly. The Hungarian public higher education system includes universities and other higher education institutes, that provide both education curricula and related degrees up to doctoral degree and also contribute to research activities. In general, public Hungarian universities don't charge tuition fees.

The following is a list of universities and colleges of higher education in Hungary (listed alphabetically and grouped by location and funding), followed by a list of defunct institutions.

== Universities ==
=== In Budapest ===
Institution	Abbr.	Number of		Type	Established
Institution	Abbr.	Students	Academics	Type	Established
Andrássy University Budapest	ANNYE	250	51	University	2001
University of Veterinary Medicine	ÁTE	2000	142	Medical school	1851 / 1952 / 2016
Corvinus University	BCE	8,000		Business school	1920 / 1948 / 1990
Budapest University of Economics and Business	BGE	20,000	987	Business school	1857 / 2016
Budapest University of Technology and Economics	BME	24,000	1,200	Institute of technology	1782
Eötvös Loránd University	ELTE	38,000	1,800	Research university	1635 / 1777 / 1950
Franz Liszt Academy of Music	LFZE	831	168	Music school	1875
Hungarian University of Fine Arts	MKE	652	232	Art school	1871 / 2000
Hungarian Dance Academy	MTE			Art school	/ 2017
Moholy-Nagy University of Art and Design	MOME	894	122	Art school	2001
National University of Public Service	NKE	10,800	465	National university	2011 (1808)
Óbuda University	OE	12,000	421	Institute of technology	1879 / 2000 / 2010
Semmelweis University	SE	16,000	1,304	Medical school	1769 / 1969
Academy of Drama and Film	SZFE	455	111	Art school	2000
University of Physical Education	TE	2,500	220	Physical education	1925 / 2014
Lutheran Theological University	EHE	220	36	Lutheranism	1557
Károli Gáspár University of Reformed Church	KRE	9,000	342	Calvinism	1993 (1855)
Budapest University of Jewish Studies	OR-ZSE	200	60	Judaism	1877
Pázmány Péter Catholic University	PPKE	11,000	736	Catholic	1992 (1635)
Budapest Metropolitan University	METU	7,000	300	University	2001
Central European University	CEU	1,380	399	University	1991
Milton Friedman University	MILTON			Business School	2001
Dennis Gabor University	DGU	1,250		Institute of technology	1992
Kodolányi János University	KJU	3,000		University	1992
International Business School	IBS	800	155	Business School	1991

=== In the rest of the country ===
==== Public institutions of higher education ====
Institution	Abbr.	City	Number of		Type	Established
Institution	Abbr.	City	Students	Academics	Type	Established
University of Debrecen	DE	Debrecen	32,351	1,700	Classic university	1912 (1538)
University of Dunaújváros	DUE	Dunaújváros		120	Applied science	1962
Eszterházy Károly University	EKE	Eger	7,000	700	Applied science	1774
University of Kaposvár	KE	Kaposvár		291	Classic university	2000 (1961)
University of Miskolc	ME	Miskolc	9,513	536	Classic university	1949 (1735)
University of Nyíregyháza	NYE	Nyíregyháza	5,000	319	Applied science	2000
University of West Hungary	NYME	Sopron	2,700	684		2008 / 2000 / 1735
John von Neumann University	NJE	Kecskemét	6,510	216	Institute of technology	2016 / 2000
University of Pannonia	PE	Veszprém	9,632		Applied science	1949 (1797)
University of Pécs	PTE	Pécs	22,325	1,854	Research university	1921 (1367)
Széchenyi István University	SZE	Győr	15,000		Institute of technology	1968 / 2002
Szent István University	SZIE	Gödöllő	19,000		Institute of technology	2000
University of Szeged	SZTE	Szeged	24,834	1400	Research university	1872 (1581)

==== Privately or church funded universities ====
- Debrecen Reformed Theological University
- Milton Friedman University

Universities in Budapest
Name	Established	City	Type	Students	Academics
Aquincum Institute of Technology	2011	Budapest	Private Institute of technology	50	41

=== Other Hungarian-language universities ===
Hungarian-language universities not in Hungary
Name	Established	City	Type	Country
Babeș-Bolyai University (Note: Official instruction in three languages: Romanian, Hungarian and German.)	1919 (1959)	Cluj-Napoca	Classic university	Romania
Ferenc Rákóczi II. Transcarpathian Hungarian Institute	1996	Berehove	Classic university	Ukraine
Sapientia – Hungarian University of Transylvania	2001	Cluj-Napoca	Classic university	Romania
Selye János University	2004	Komárno	Research university	Slovakia
UMFST Târgu Mureș (Note: Has separate section offering teaching and administrative support only in Hungarian.)	1945 (1948)	Târgu Mureș	Medical school	Romania

=== Former universities ===
- Albert Szent-Györgyi Medical University (merged with others to form University of Szeged in 2000)
- Attila József University (merged with others to form University of Szeged in 2000)
- Debrecen University of Agricultural Sciences (merged with others to form University of Debrecen)
- Franz Joseph University (ceased operation in 1945)
- Gödöllő University of Agricultural Sciences (merged with others to form Szent István University in 2000)
- Hungarian University of Applied Arts (renamed to Moholy-Nagy University of Art and Design in 2006)
- Hungarian University of Physical Education (merged with Semmelweis University)
- Imre Haynal University of Health Sciences Budapest (merged with Semmelweis University)
- Janus Pannonius University (merged with others to form University of Pécs in 2000)
- Lajos Kossuth University (merged with others to form University of Debrecen)
- Miklós Zrínyi University of National Defence (merged with others to form National University of Public Service in 2012)
- University Medical School of Debrecen (merged with others to form University of Debrecen)
- University Medical School of Pécs (merged with others to form University of Pécs in 2000)
- University of Horticulture and Food Industry (merged with others to form Szent István University in 2000)
- University of Sopron (merged with others to form University of Western Hungary in 2000)
- University of Veterinary Science (merged with others to form Szent István University in 2000)

== Colleges of higher education ==
=== In Budapest ===
==== State funded ====
- Hungarian Dance Academy

==== Privately or church funded ====
- Avicenna International College
- Baptist Theological Academy
- Bhaktivedanta Theological College
- Budapest College of Management
- Budapest Contemporary Dance Academy
- CBS Central European International College
- Duna International College
- The Gate of the Teaching Buddhist College
- Harsányi János College
- International Business School, Budapest
- International Pető András Institute of Conductive Education for the Motor Disabled and Conductor-Teacher Training College
- John Wesley Theological College
- Pentacostal [sic?] Theological College
- Sapientia School of Theology
- Milton Friedman University
- Sola Scriptura Theological College
- Szent Pál Academy
- Wekerle Business School

=== In the rest of the country ===
==== State funded ====
- College of Szolnok, Szolnok
- Eötvös József College, Baja
- Kecskemét College, Kecskemét

==== Privately or church funded ====
- Adventist Theological College, Pécel
- Apor Vilmos Catholic College, Vác
- Archiepiscopal Theological College of Veszprém, Veszprém
- College of Modern Business Studies, Tatabánya
- Gál Ferenc Theological College, Szeged
- Győri Theological College, Győr
- Kodolányi János University, Budapest, Székesfehérvár, Orosháza
- Pápa Theological Academy of the Reformed Church, Pápa
- Sárospatak Theological Academy of the Reformed Church, Sárospatak
- Szent Atanáz Greek Catholic Theological Institute, Nyíregyháza
- Szent Bernát Theological College, Zirc
- Theological College of Eger, Eger
- Theological College of Esztergom, Esztergom
- Theological College of Pécs
- Tomori Pál College, Kalocsa

=== Former colleges of higher education ===
- Berzsenyi Dániel College (merged with University of West Hungary)
- Kölcsey Ferenc Reformed Teacher's Training College (merged with Debrecen Reformed Theological University)
- Police College (merged with others to form National University of Public Service in 2012)
- Vitéz János Roman Catholic Teacher's Training College (merged with Pázmány Péter Catholic University)

== See also ==
- Open access in Hungary
