= International Business School =

International Business School can refer to a number of institutions around the world, some of which are listed below:

- International Business School, Budapest
- International Business School, Germany
- Brandeis International Business School
- International Business School Groningen
- International Business School Plekhanov Russian Academy of Economics
- Isle of Man International Business School
- École de management de Normandie
