= University of Finance and Administration =

Czech academic publisher

- Vysoká škola finanční a správní
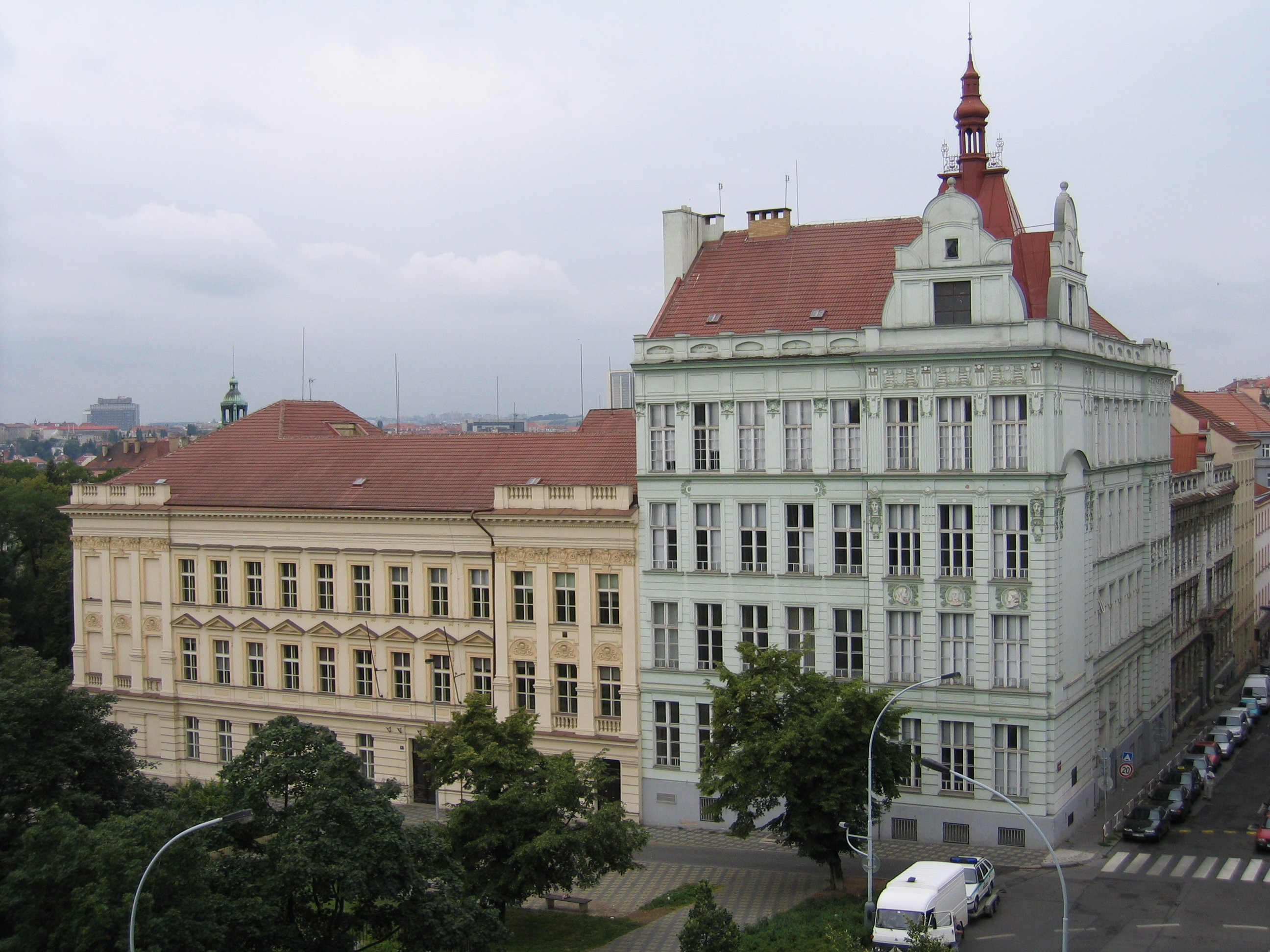
- Type: Private, Non-profit
- Established: 1999
- Affiliations: ERASMUS, City University, COEUR
- Rector: Bohuslava Šenkýřová
- Students: 5,421
- Location: Prague, Czech Republic; 50.0711122°N 14.4530614°E
- Website: http://www.vsfs.cz/

The University of Finance and Administration (Czech: Vysoká škola finanční a správní o.p.s., VŠFS) is a private business school in the Czech Republic. It was founded by the Bank Academy and Czech Coal Group in 1999 and was one of the first private business schools in the country. It has had full university status from the accreditation committee of the Czech government since 2009.

== History ==
In 1998 the Czech government passed a new Tertiary Education Code, 111/1998 Sb., entitling private schools to offer higher education. The University of Finance and Administration was founded the next year.

VSFS expanded in 2001, opening new campuses in Most and Kladno. In 2002 the university entered into cooperation with the City University of Seattle in the United States, and in 2004 joined the Erasmus programme and European Credit Transfer and Accumulation System (ECTS). In 2009 VSFS received state approval of its doctoral program and became a university. Since September 2016, the VSFS has its branch in Karlovy Vary, the building is in the city center, on the T.G. Masaryk Avenue.

== Study programs ==
In addition to Bachelors and Masters study programmes, and a Doctoral Study Programme (Ph.D.), the university runs study programs for local and regional government bodies, accredited by the Ministry of the Interior.

Thanks to its cooperation with the City University of Seattle, VSFS also runs Master of Business Administration (MBA) and Bachelor of Science in Business Administration (BSBA) programs in English. These include MBA programs focused on Global Management, Financial Management or Marketing Management, and a BSBA program offered as a Double Degree, a combination of the Czech and English program.

== Regional campuses ==
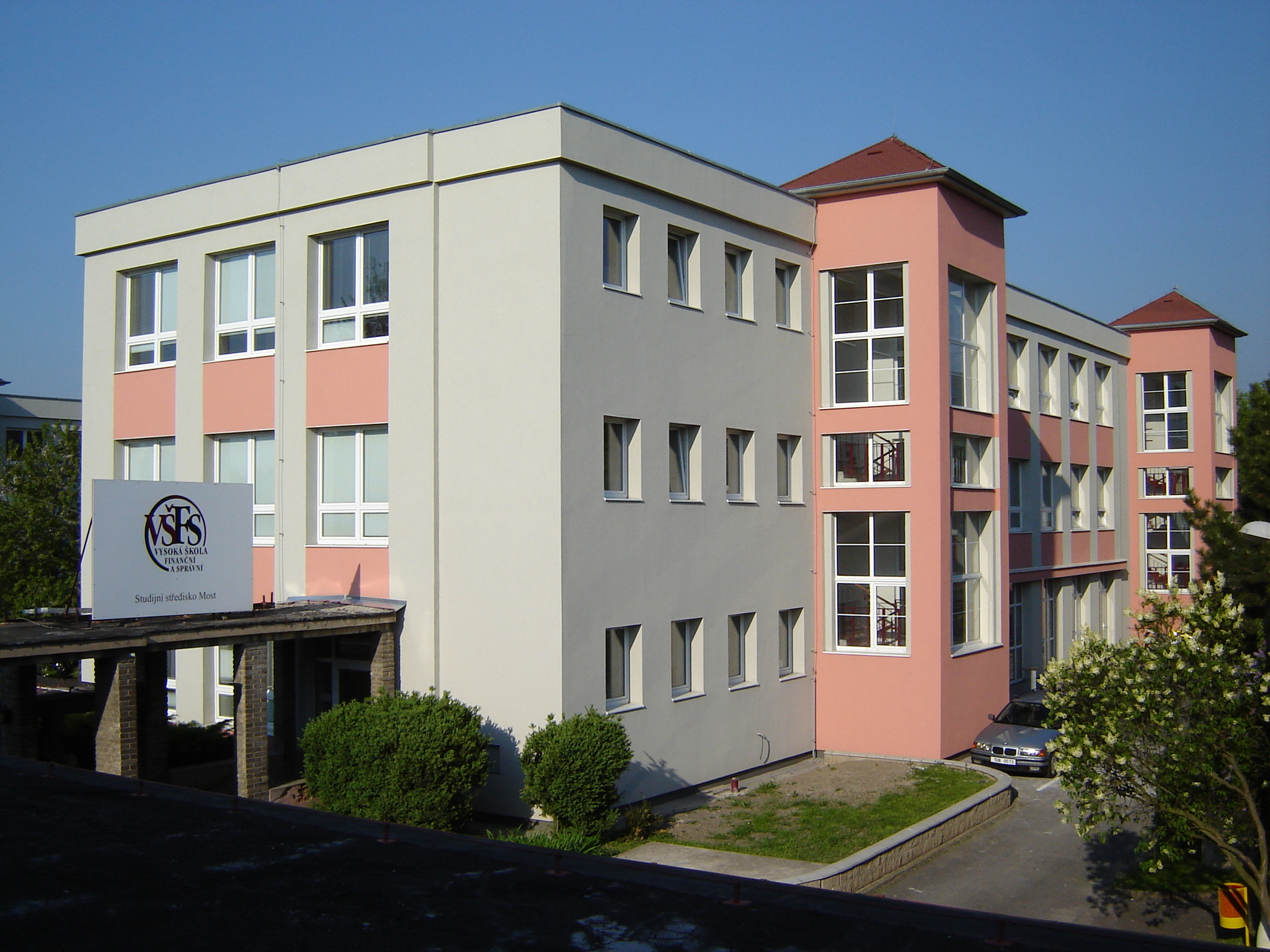
Campus in Most

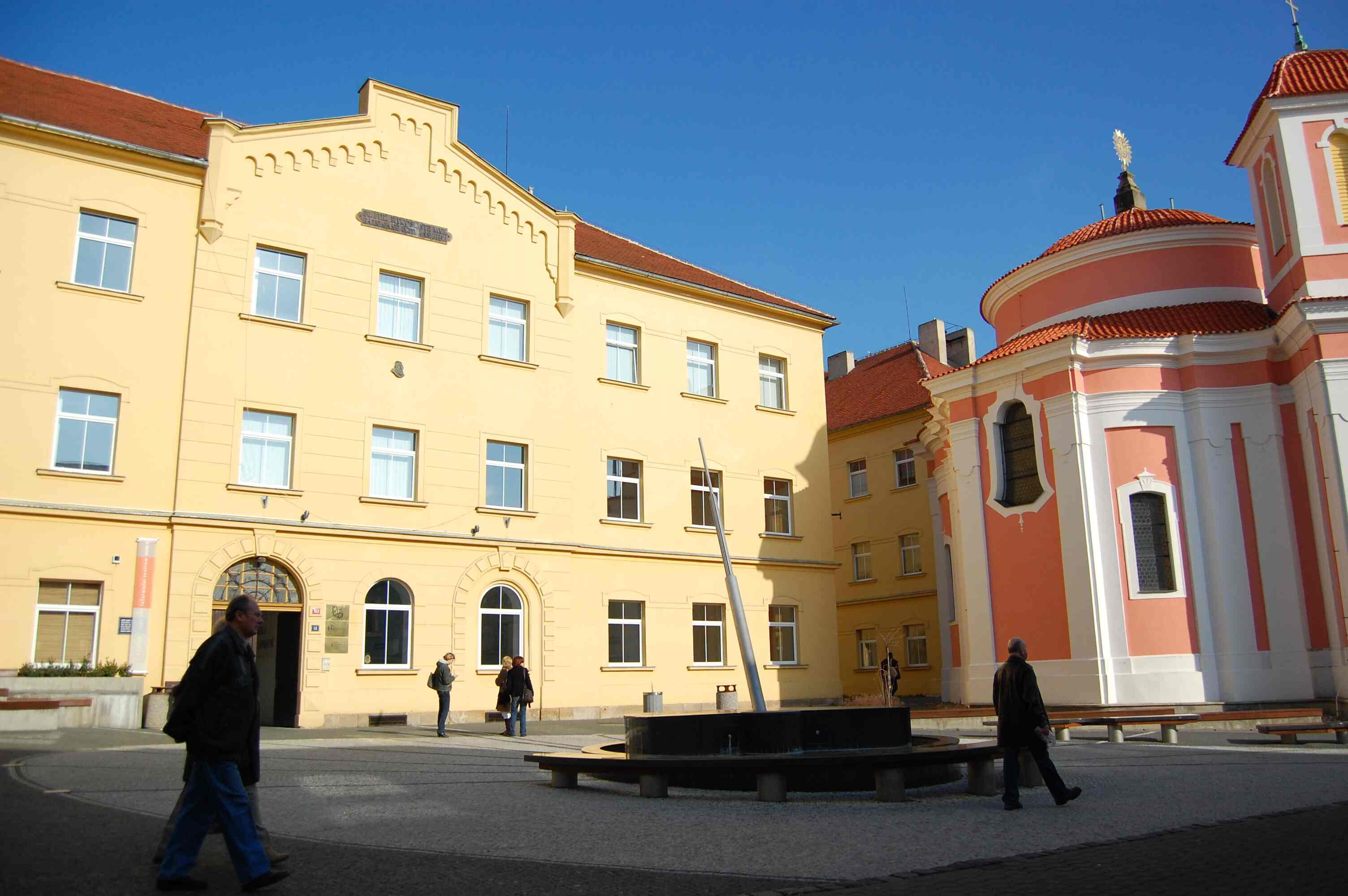
Campus in Kladno

The director of the campus in Most is Josef Švec, and the director of the campus in Karlovy Vary is Lenka Chlebková.

== Erasmus partners ==
- Austria: Fachhoschule des BFI Wien
- Belgium: EPHEC
- Finland: HUMAK University of Applied Sciences
- Finland: Savonia University of Applied Sciences
- France: Burgundy School of Business
- France: Douai Business School
- France: Paris 12 Val de Marne University
- France: Groupe ESC Troyes
- France: Lille University of Science and Technology
- Germany: Fachhochschule Ingolstadt
- Germany: University of Applied Sciences, Mainz
- Germany: Beuth University of Applied Sciences Berlin
- Germany: Chemnitz University of Technology
- Germany: Ravensburg University of Cooperative Education
- Hungary: Budapest College of Management
- Ireland: Maynooth University NUIM
- Iceland: Bifröst University
- Italy: Sapienza University of Rome
- Liechtenstein: Hochschule Liechtenstein
- Lithuania: Vilnius University
- Netherlands: Netherlands: Hogeschool Zeeland
- Poland: Opole University of Technology
- Poland: Wroclaw University of Economics
- Slovakia: City University of Seattle
- Slovakia: Pan-European University
- Slovenia: GEA College of Entrepreneurship
- Spain: Polytechnic University of Valencia - Alcoy campus
- Spain: CEU San Pablo University - Madrid campus
- Turkey: Anadolu University
- United Kingdom: University of Gloucestershire
- United Kingdom: United Kingdom: Robert Gordon University

== See also ==
- Education in the Czech Republic
