= OSK =

OSK or Osk may refer to:

- Ósk, an Icelandic feminine given name
- OS-K group, a candidate phylum of bacteria from Octopus spring, Yellowstone National Park
- On-screen keyboard, a computer user interface device
- Orchestre Symphonique Kimbanguiste, a Congolese orchestra
- ÖSK, Örebro SK, a Swedish professional football and bandy club
- Ortaköy Spor Kulübü, a Turkish sports club
- Osaka Shosen Kaisha, a former Japanese shipping company
- Ōsaki Station, JR East station code
- OSK Holdings Berhad, a Malaysian financial services company
- Oslo SK, a Norwegian sports club
- osk, developer of the browser game TETR.IO
