= OSK Holdings =

OSK Holdings Berhad
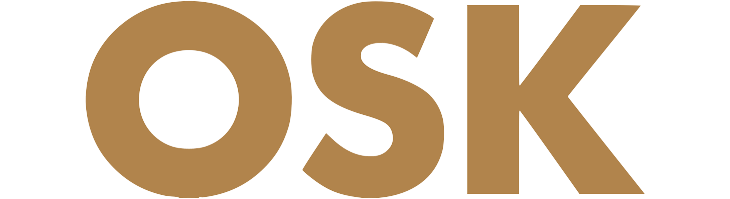
- Type: Public limited company
- Traded as: MYX: 5053
- ISIN: MYL5053OO003
- Industry: Conglomerate
- Headquarters: Kuala Lumpur, Malaysia
- Key people: Tan Sri Ong Leong Huat, Executive Chairman; Ong Ju Yan, Group Managing Director; Ong Ju Xing, Deputy Group Managing Director
- Products: Property & Property Investment; Financial services Construction; Industries; Hospitality
- Revenue: RM1.9 billion (FY 2025)
- Net income: RM575.96 million (FY 2025)
- Website: OSK Holdings Berhad website

OSK Holdings Berhad (OSK) (MYX: 5053) is a publicly listed company on the Main Board of Bursa Malaysia Securities Berhad. Despite its public-listing status, it is 80.76% owned by individuals, with the majority owned by its Executive Chairman Ong Leong Huat. OSK has diversified away from its stockbroking business and investment banking activities to now focus on property development and manufacturing.

OSK is mainly focused on five business segments for the bulk of its operations. These include: Property Development & Investment, Financial Services, Construction, Industries, and Hospitality.

== History ==
In 1963, OSK was established as a small-scale stockbroking company. The name OSK stands for Ong Securities and King, originating from its stockbroking days.

On 31 May 1991, OSK Holdings was listed on Bursa Malaysia's Main Market.

In 2001, OSK acquired three Malaysian brokers and gained Universal Broker status.

In 2007, OSK was granted an investment bank license by Bank Negara Malaysia.

In 2012, RHB Capital Berhad purchased 100% of OSK Investment Bank in a share swap agreement. In return, OSK received a 10.27% stake in the entire RHB group.

In 2015, PJ Development Holdings Berhad (PJDH) and OSK Property Holdings Berhad (OSKPH) officially became subsidiaries of OSK.

== Operations ==
=== Property Development and Investment ===
OSK Property (OSKP) owns and develops properties within Malaysia and abroad in Australia. Some of the most notable properties the company owns are Atria Shopping Gallery in Damansara, You City in Cheras, Plaza OSK near Ampang Park, and the upcoming Melbourne Square development in Australia.

=== Financial Services ===
OSK is a non-bank financial institution regulated by Bank Negara Malaysia. The company also offers Shariah-compliant personal financing primarily for government servants under its OSK Syariah Capital subsidiary. With its recent acquisition of Wilayah Capital for RM16.50 million, OSK has expanded into the motorcycle financing sector. As of 2026, OSK intends to expand into the Australian market, with its Australian asset management subsidiary obtaining an Australian financial services license (AFSL).

=== Construction ===
The company also manages and operates its in-house construction arm of OSK Holdings Berhad. It handles residential, commercial, and infrastructure projects in Malaysia and Thailand. Many of its materials are sourced by OSK's Industries segment.

=== Industries ===
Under its industries division, OSK owns the Olympic Cable Company (OCC) and Acotec Sdn. Bhd.

The Olympic Cable Company was first incorporated in 1968, and manufactures power cables for domestic and ASEAN markets. Its main factory is located in Melaka, while its second factory is located in Johor Bahru. Customers have included Tenaga Nasional, Kuala Lumpur International Airport and MRT Corp; it also exports roughly 5% of its cables abroad to countries such as Vietnam, Singapore, and Cambodia.

Acotec Sdn. Bhd. was incorporated in 1994 and manufactures IBS (pre-fabricated) hollow core precast concrete wall panels used in constructing apartments and homes. The company operates three manufacturing facilities located in Nilai, Taiping, and Bandar Tenggara, with the Bandar Tenggara facility primarily serving the Singapore market. As of 2019, Acotec's wall panels have been supplied to over 700 projects in Singapore and over 600 projects in Malaysia.

=== Hospitality ===
OSK owns four hotels in its portfolio. These include its flagship Swiss-Garden Hotel & Residences Genting Highlands, Swiss-Garden Beach Resorts Kuantan, Holiday Inn Express & Suites Johor Bahru, and DoubleTree by Hilton Damai Laut Resort.

== Regional Presence ==
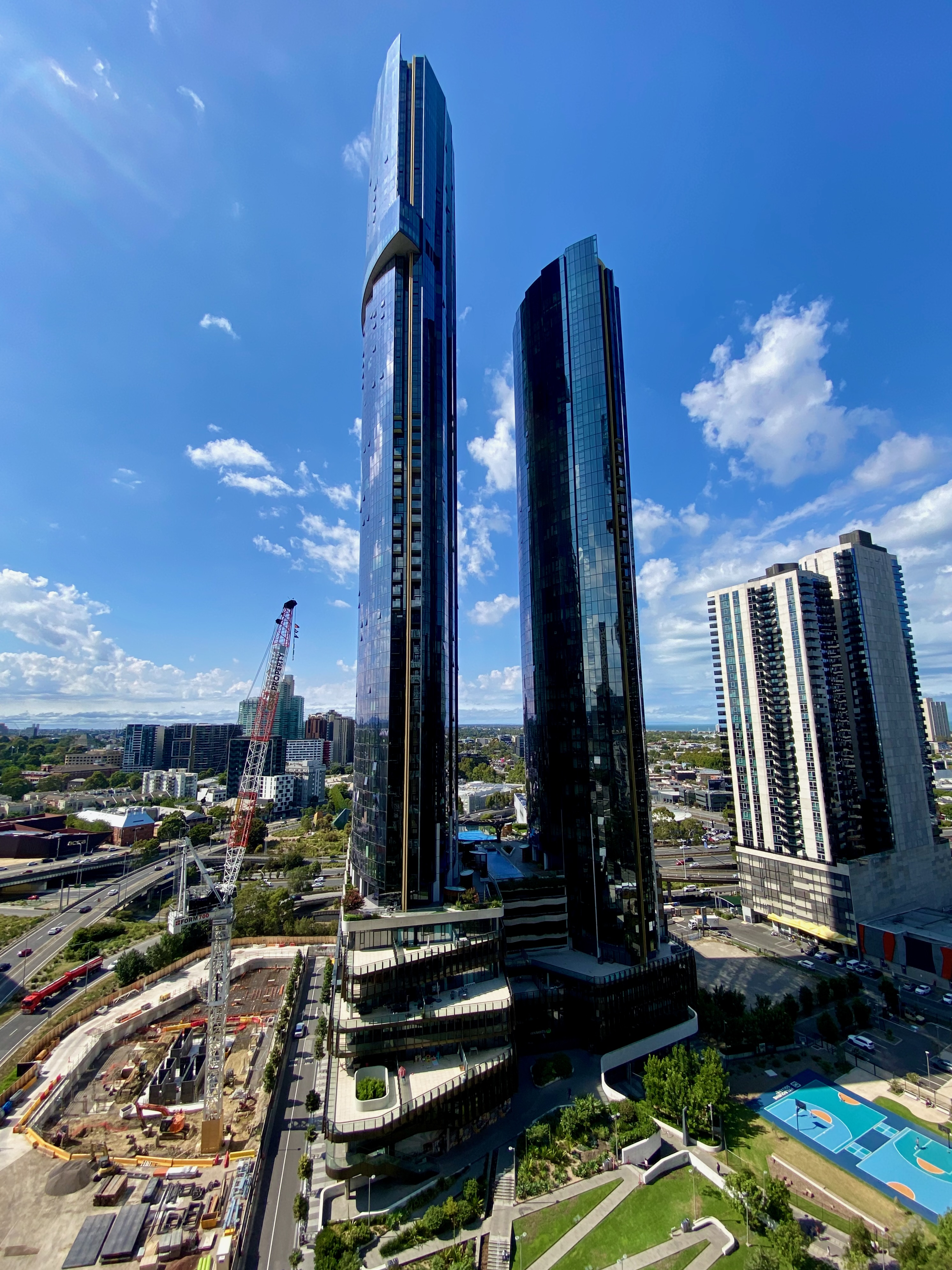
OSK's Melbourne Square under construction

OSK has over 50 offices across Malaysia and has a presence in the following countries:

- Australia
- Singapore
- Thailand

In April 2008, Bank Negara approved OSK's plan to set up a commercial bank in Cambodia to undertake commercial banking activities. OSK Indochina Bank Ltd had, on October 10, 2008, commenced commercial banking operations in Phnom Penh. The bank offered the full range of retail and commercial banking products and services as well as foreign exchange and capital market expertise. In the same month, OSK bought a 51% stake in Indonesian stockbroking company PT Nusadana Capital Indonesia (PTNCI) for RM69.8 million, expanding its investment banking services to the country.

However, after RHB Bank acquired OSK Indochina Bank in 2013, OSK sold all of its Cambodian assets to RHB. RHB also acquired PT RHB OSK Securities Indonesia, formerly PT Nusadana Capital Indonesia, from OSK in November 2012.
