= Institute for Structural Research =

The Institute for Structural Research (Instytut Badań Strukturalnych or IBS) is an independent scientific foundation based in Warsaw, established in 2006. The main aim of this organization is to organize and support the research increasing innovation and competitiveness of economy. The foundation inspires and carries out scientific works in the fields of:

- Economics
- Mathematics
- Informatics and quantitative methods
- Social Sciences

== Management of the Institute for Structural Research (IBS) ==
- Piotr Lewandowski – President of the Board
- Iga Magda – Vice President of the Board
- Julian Zawistowski – Chairman of the Council
- Paweł Kowal – Member of the Council
