= Iptor Supply Chain Systems =

Software company based in Sweden

- Type: Public (former); Private
- Industry: Supply chain management
- Founded: 1978
- Founder: Staffan Ahlberg and Gunnar Rylander
- Headquarters: Stockholm, Sweden
- Number of locations: Worldwide
- Area served: Worldwide
- Key people: Jessica Hayes, CEO
- Products: Supply chain management software
- Services: Supply chain management
- Website: www.iptor.com

Iptor Supply Chain Systems, formerly International Business Systems (IBS), is a supply chain management company that provides professional services and enterprise resource management software for distributors and wholesalers, with its headquarters in Stockholm, Sweden. They were previously publicly traded on the Stockholm Stock Exchange and have offices in several countries. They are rated by AMR Research and Frost & Sullivan as the largest supply chain execution services company by revenue.

The company rebranded as Iptor in September 2016.

== History ==
Logo as International Business Systems

The company was founded as IBS in 1978 by Staffan Ahlberg and Gunnar Rylander. Both decided to form the company by turning the IT division of Ekonomisk Företagsledning into an independent company. Their first major project was to develop an order processing system for Alfa Laval subsidiaries. The company went public on the Stockholm Stock Exchange in 1986. Around the same time they entered into partnership with IBM and became a supplier of software for the IBM AS/400. Ahlberg retired as the CEO of IBS in 2002 and was the longest serving CEO of a public company in Europe.

IBS expanded into Asia in 1996. The company also has a presence in the United States.

IBS purchased Australian-based international software developer IDS Enterprise Systems in 2005. At the time of the deal, IDS had revenue of €12 million and more than 100 employees and operations in the United Kingdom, the Netherlands, Australia, and Thailand.

In 2011, IBS was purchased by Symphony Technology Group. The deal made Symphony a 94.9% shareholder of IBS and the company went from being publicly traded to private.

== Products and services ==
IBS offers supply chain management software and services to distributors and wholesalers for small, medium and Fortune 500 companies. They also offer logistics, demand management, customer relationship management, financial management, and business intelligence services.

IBS Enterprise distribution resource management is a software suite from IBS that automates supply chain management including inventory planning, purchasing and supplier management, warehouse optimization, value-added services, demand management and returns processing.

IBS provides a publishing-specific platform referred to as the Bookmaster. The platform is an enterprise management business software designed for publishers and book distributors in both the print and digital markets. It incorporates financial and supply chain management within the software that also integrates with web-based financial transactions and business management processes.

IBS also offers a platform referred to as Dynaman which supports warehouse operations. The software is designed to improve process control, data capturing and visibility of inventory. It also allows integration with supply chain partner operations.

IBS also offers a connectivity platform designed to allow organizations and applications to connect and communicate with each other. Referred to as the IBS Integrator, it contains more than 12 service-specific adapters which enable it to connect between different systems and business partners. IBS has won multiple awards for the IBS Integrator.

== Awards ==
IBS received the Supply-Chain Council Award in 2003, and was named to the list of Top 100 Companies in 2002 by Frontline magazine.
