= Industrialised building system =

Industrialised building system (IBS) is a term used in Malaysia for a construction technique in which components are manufactured in a controlled environment, either on-site or off-site, and then placed and assembled into construction works.

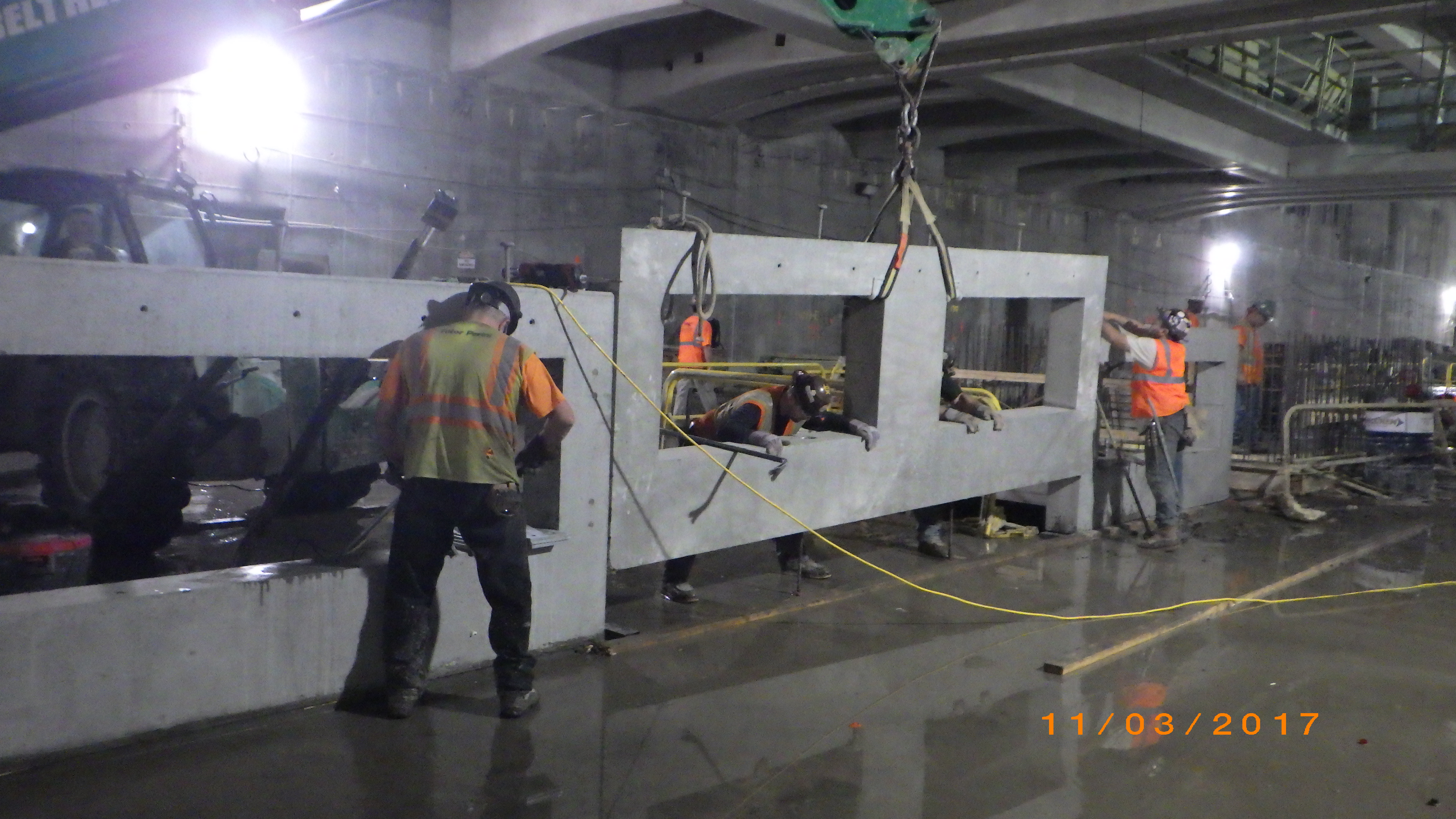
Pre-fabrication process in the NYC Subway

Globally, IBS is also known as Pre-fabrication, Modern Method of Construction (MMC), or Off-site Construction.

The Construction Industry Development Board of Malaysia (CIDB), a Malaysian government agency under the Ministry of Works, promotes the use of IBS to increase productivity and construction quality at construction sites through various promotional programmes, training, and incentives. The CIDB themselves are the national overseer of IBS operations; IBS operations are rated by the CIDB using the IBS Score, which evaluates how well a project conforms to the government's IBS standards. The IBS Score itself is rated from 0-100, with a higher IBS Score indicating greater usage of IBS in the project. The Score follows Malaysia's Construction Industry Standard 18 (CIS 18: 2010) and can be verified either manually, through a web application, or through a fully automated CAD-based IBS Score calculator.

Gamuda is Malaysia's largest fully automated, digital IBS wall panel and precast concrete manufacturer. OSK Group's Acotec Sdn Bhd is also a prominent player in the IBS concrete wall panel manufacturing sector.

== History and usage ==
The first example of a building that utilised IBS construction was the Pekeliling Flats, which was completed in 1964 and demolished in 2014.

Due to a combination of government policy and incentives, IBS usage in Malaysia has increased dramatically. IBS implementation increased from 79.5% in 2020 to 84% in 2021, while in the private sector, IBS usage increased from 41% in 2020 to 60% in 2021.

IBS has received positive reception from both private and public developers in Malaysia, namely by Gamuda, the Mah Sing Group, S P Setia, and PKNS.

From 2008 onwards, it became compulsory for all government projects worth more than RM10 million to achieve an IBS Score of 70 or higher. Additionally, after approval from the Malaysian cabinet on 19 May 2021, a minimum IBS Score of 70 became mandatory for private projects with a Gross Floor Area (GFA) of more than 50,000 square metres or a total value exceeding RM50 million.

As of March 2023, there are 118 IBS suppliers in Malaysia, covering all IBS category types.

== IBS components currently available in the Malaysian market ==
=== Blockwork system ===
A construction method where prefabricated and standardised masonry units, such as Autoclaved Aerated Concrete (AAC), or interlocking blocks, are produced off-site in a controlled setting before being transported and assembled on-site without extensive mortar or wet trades.

=== Formwork system ===
A modern and eco-friendly construction method where traditional timber formwork is replaced with prefabricated modular panels, usually made out of steel, aluminium, and high-strength plastic. It is one of the most widely used IBS components in Malaysia, as it decreases waste, increases construction speed, and enables higher quality concrete finishes.

=== Timber framing system ===
Wooden structural components (wall panels, floor joists, roof trusses) are manufactured in a controlled factory environment, then transported to the site to be assembled.

=== Precast component system ===
This system can be segmented into five sub-systems:

- Structural framing system = skeletal structure of a building consists of precast concrete columns and beams.
- Wall panel system = solid, hollow core, or sandwich precast concrete panels act as structural load-bearing walls or non-load-bearing partitions.
- Slab system = Precast half-slabs or hollow core slabs hoisted into place on site to function as floors or ceilings.
- Volumetric or box system = complete and full prefabrication of modular units which can come in the form of parts of a room (eg. bathroom, kitchen) or can even consist of a room in its entirety.
- Staircases and Façades = prefabricated staircases and façades to meet the needs of the construction site.

=== Steel framing system ===
Also known as Light Steel Frame (LSF), it is a method where all walls, floor joists, and roof trusses are prefabricated off-site in a factory using high-tensile galvanised cold-formed steel.

== Benefits ==
Some advantages include a faster project completion timeline, higher and more consistent material quality, and increased worksite efficiency. Additionally, IBS reduces the number of on-site workers, improves safety conditions due to decluttering, and is not prone to adverse weather disruptions. These benefits then cumulate in savings and lower long-term costs.

IBS is considered a more environmentally friendly alternative to traditional construction methods. The precise nature of off-site, controlled factory production of prefabricated pieces leads to major waste reduction, sometimes reducing waste up to 90%. It can also reduce carbon footprint, as fewer deliveries, fewer sizing errors, and increased efficiency can lead to a 40% decrease in carbon emissions. Factory processes are also more energy-efficient than on-site methods, reducing energy usage up to 67%.

Regarding its impact on the community, projects that tend to have a high IBS Score also tend to have quieter construction sites due to the reduced dust, noise, and pollution generated from on-site machinery.

== Drawbacks ==
In Malaysia, where foreign labour is cheaper compared to Australia or the United States, IBS can be 5-15% more expensive in contrast to traditional methods.

In geographic areas where IBS capacity is limited, such as in Sabah and Sarawak, there are concerns regarding whether the government's legal IBS Score thresholds can be met. The entire state of Sarawak only has 13 IBS manufacturers and suppliers, with 9 of them located in the capital of Kuching, three of them in Sibu, and one of them in Bintulu.

Furthermore, IBS can only be implemented in countries with strong transportation and supply chain links. The prefabricated pieces, sometimes long and fragile, require extensive logistical planning and coordination, especially if the construction site is far away from the IBS factory.

== List of buildings constructed using IBS ==
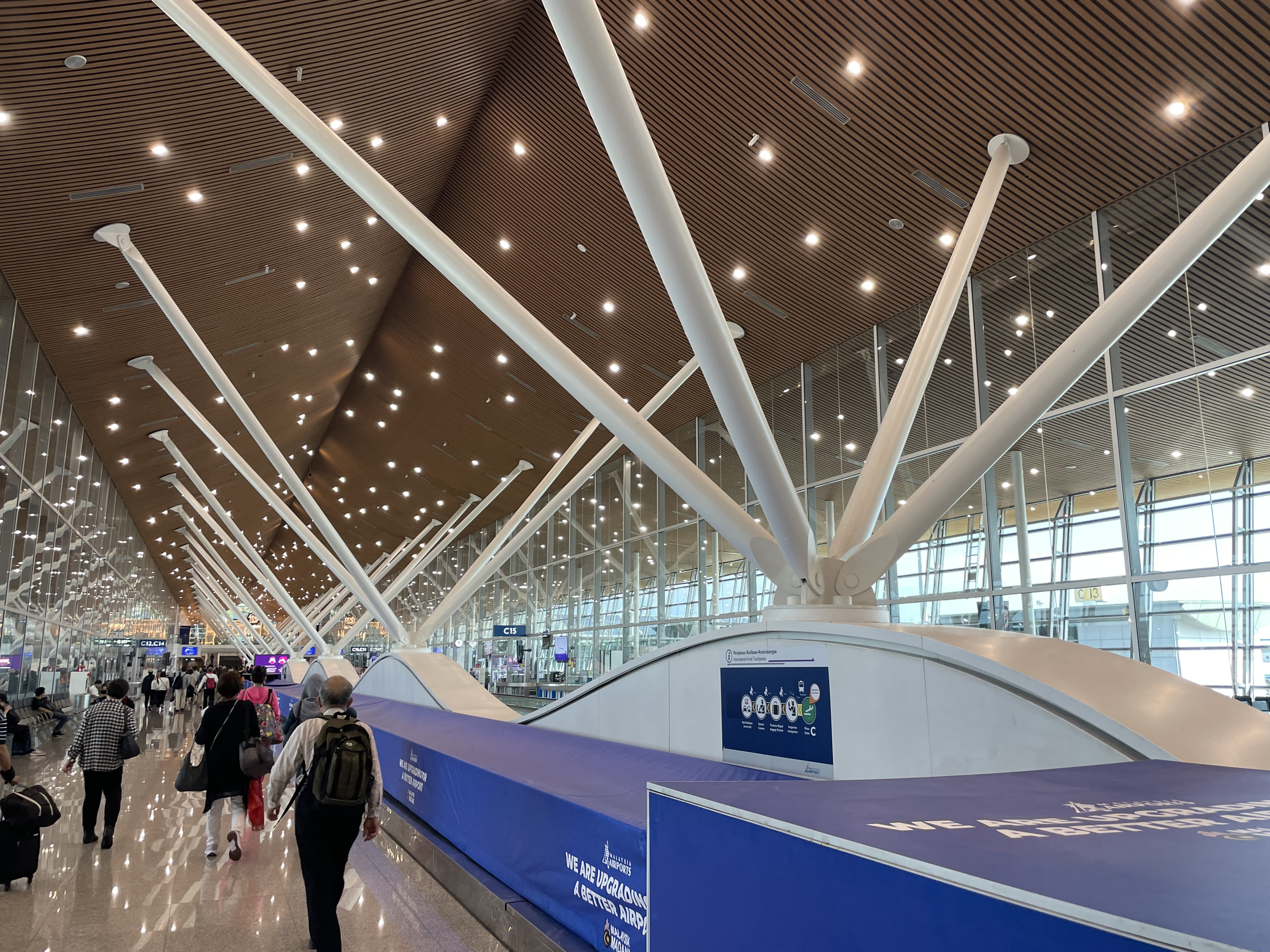
Kuala Lumpur International Airport's steel roof trusses utilised IBS

- Sultan Iskandar Building - concrete beams, hollow slabs, and columns
- Open University Malaysia - concrete beams, hollow slabs, and columns
- Kuala Lumpur International Airport - Main Terminal steel roof structure
- Kuala Lumpur Sentral station - steel roof structure and hollow core slabs
- Telekom Tower - Sky garden and roof pinnacle
- Serdang Hospital - steel beams, steel columns, and concrete half slabs
- SMART Tunnel - tunnel linings
