= Melbourne Square =

Melbourne Square may refer to:

- Melbourne Square (complex), an approved for construction skyscraper complex in Melbourne, Australia
- Melbourne Square (mall), a shopping mall in Melbourne, United States
