= Budapest College of Management =

- Általános Vállalkozási Főiskola
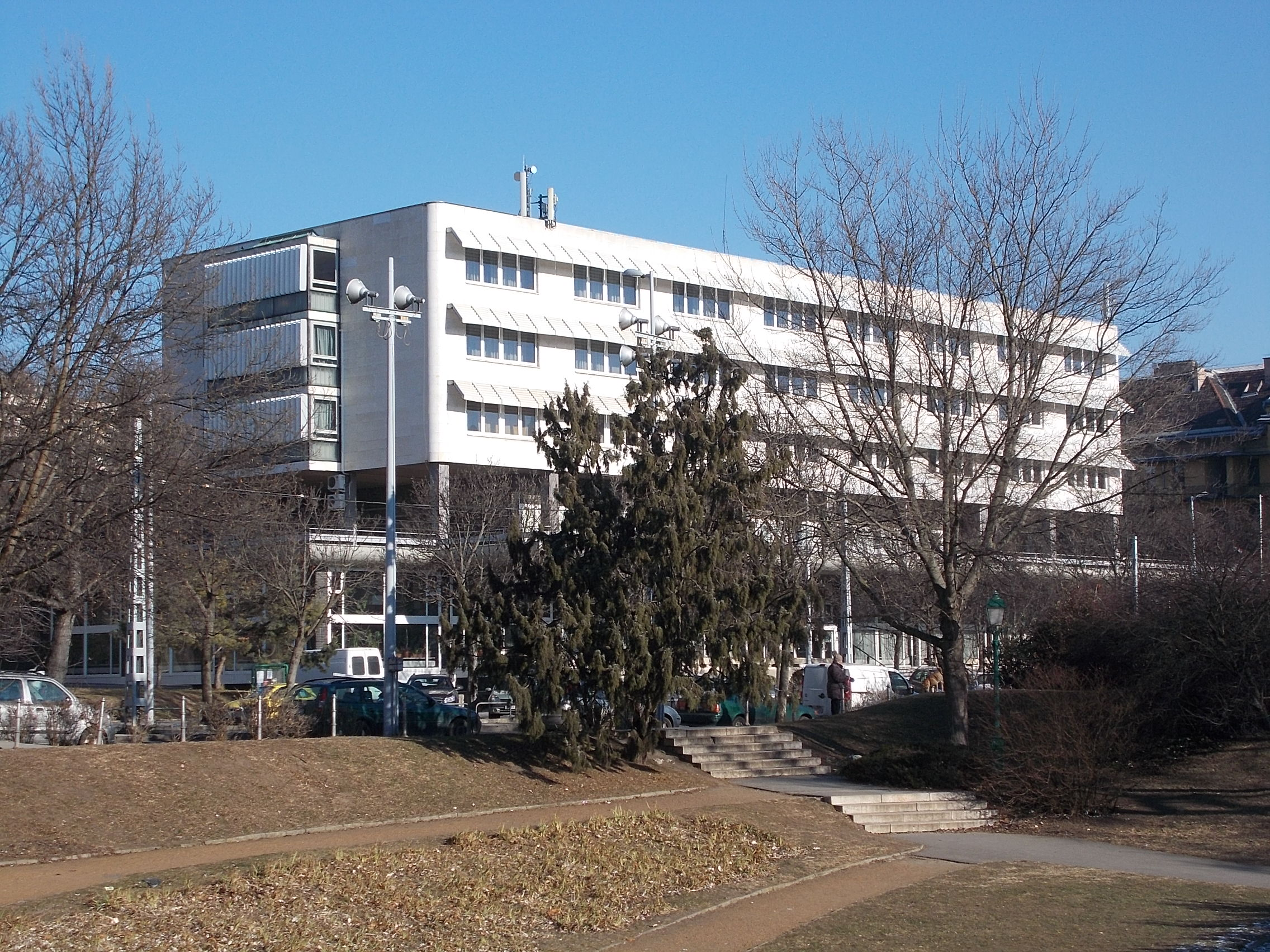
- The college building on Villányi street
- Established: 1996
- Location: Budapest, Hungary
- Website: www.avf.hu

Budapest College of Management (Hungarian: Általános Vállalkozási Főiskola) business and management training college located in Budapest, Hungary. The college was established in 1996. On 1 January 2015 Budapest College of Management merged with International Business School, Budapest.

== Courses ==
Some of the courses offered by this college are—

Undergraduate courses

- Business Administration and Management
- International Business
- Public Services
- International Relations
- Social Sciences

Post-graduate courses

- Business Development
- International Relations

Non-degree programs

- Preparatory Program
- Professional Training Courses
