= International Business School, Germany =

International Business School
- Type: for-profit, private, higher education college
- Established: 1984
- Director: Thomas Nau
- Location: Nuremberg, Germany
- Owner: ESO Education Group
- Website: international-business-school.de

The International Business School (IBS) was founded in1984 as a non-academic private business school. It offered three-year full-time management programs in different management disciplines. It also specialized in foreign language training. Due to declining student numbers and uncertainty in the European higher education market following Brexit, the Nuremberg campus-the last remaining IBS location-closed in 2021, ending the school's operations. With the closure of its last campus, the International Business School concluded its more than three-decade history as a provider of business and management education in Germany

== History & Focus areas ==
The school was originally established in Lippstadt in 1984. By 2002 further branches were established in Bad Nauheim and Berlin. The branch in Nuremberg opened in 2006.

The International Business School offered six-semester full-time programs in areas such as General Management, Hotel and Tourism Management, Media, Culture and Event Management, Marketing Management, Business Psychology and Human Resources, Real Estate Management, and Sports Management. Students received a non-academic IBS diploma as “Internationaler Betriebswirt (IBS)”.

In addition, students could achieve an academic bachelor's degree, most recently awarded as a “Bachelor of Arts in Management” from the University of Sunderland in England. Prior to that, IBS Lippstadt partnered with the University of Lincoln. The English bachelor's degree was completed at the English university in cooperation with IBS. The state-recognized IBS Berlin was rebranded as EBC Hochschule later on. The study programs and state recognition of the university remained unaffected. Due to declining student numbers and increased competition in the higher education market, the campuses were closed one after another. Even the last cohorts were able to complete their exams and obtain their degrees.

== Course of Study ==
The “International Business Studies/International Business Administration” program consisted of six semesters and included two three-month internships (in Germany and abroad).The first three semesters made up the basic studies, while the main studies took place in the final three semesters. During the main studies, students chose a specialization (Media, Culture and Event Management, Marketing Management, Real Estate Management, General Management, Sports Management, Business Psychology and Human Resources, Hotel and Tourism Management).

This three-year full-time program was organized in cohorts of up to 25 participants, with up to 34 hours of lectures per week.

In addition to business-related subjects, IBS offered comprehensive language training. Alongside Business English, courses were available in Business French, Spanish, and Chinese (Mandarin). Two foreign languages were mandatory parts of the curriculum. IBS also prepared students for various language diplomas, such as the London Chamber of Commerce and Industry (LCCI, English for Business) certificate and the French Chamber of Commerce diploma (DFA “Diplôme de français des affaires”). Other options included COCIM, TOEIC, and TFI.

From the fourth semester onward, IBS students could also enroll at the University of Sunderland (previously: University of Lincoln) to pursue the English bachelor's degree from UK public universities alongside their specialization.

== Lecturers ==
Lecturers from the International Business School included professors from nearby universities and professionals from the business sector.

Dr. Hans-Günther van Allen, Recipient of the Order of Merit of the Federal Republic of Germany.

Prof. Dr. Wolfgang Bernartz, Program Director at IBS

Dr. Bernd Bochmann

== Business Symposium ==
Each year, IBS organized business symposia together with students, inviting representatives from the business world to discuss practical topics and challenges in management with the students. Each symposium focused on a specific question or theme, shaping the discussions and topics addressed. By organizing these business symposia, the school aimed to better prepare students for the demands of professional life. In 2006, the 13th business symposium was already held.

=== 2005 ===
Topic: "Success Through Flexibility – Opportunities and Risks for the German Economy"

Speakers/Highlights: Representatives from Warsteiner, OBI, CDU NRW

=== 2006 ===
Topic: "Watching Successful Managers in Action"

Speakers/Highlights: Executives from various industries

=== 2009 ===
Topic: "Global Player vs. Hidden Champions"

Speakers/Highlights: Discussion on global vs. local success strategies

=== 2011 ===
Topic:"Step by Step"

Speakers/Highlights: Union Investment, Audi, hotel.de, E.ON, Gothaer Investment

=== 2012 ===
Topic:" Different Ways – One Goal with Many Paths"

Speakers/Highlights: Career and business paths presented by regional companies

=== 2013 ===
Topic:Tradition Meets Future

Speakers/Highlights: Jägermeister, WDR/EinsLive, B+B Parkhaus, Martin Kind (Hannover 96)

=== 2014 ===
Topic: Facing the 21st Century – One Goal, Many Paths

Speakers/Highlights: Maritim Hotels, Otto Group, MeisterWerke, Alpecin

=== 2015 ===
Topic: Live Your Dream!

Speakers/Highlights: Laurent Gauthier, Clemens Tönnies, alumni from Douglas and Sixt

== Critics ==
The school was originally established in Lippstadt in 1984 as a GmbH (private limited company). By 2002 further branches were established in Bad Nauheim and Berlin. Although the Bad Nauheim and Berlin branches were registered as separate companies, they all had the same director and shareholders and all three were wholly owned subsidiaries of the ESO Education Group. Nevertheless, on their websites the three IBS branches misrepresented themselves to prospective students as "non-profit" institutions.

Initially, the school offered only its own diploma in Internationale Betriebswirt (International Business Administration). However, unlike the Diplom-Betriebswirt whose name it resembled, the IBS diploma was non-academic.

In 2000, IBS started a partnership with the University of Lincoln whereby the British university would enroll IBS students to their BA and MBA distance learning programmes. The BA required two more years of study following acquisition of the IBS diploma. In their advertising, IBS claimed that students would receive a "double degree" (from both Lincoln University and IBS) that was "nationally and internationally recognized". For a foreign university BA to be recognized in Germany at that time, students were required to have attended that university for three full years. This led to numerous legal complaints from students. IBS was also the subject of criticism the low quality of its teaching in the 2002 book Die Bluff-Gesellschaft by Bärbel Schwertfeger.

In early 2005, a student at the Bad Nauheim branch sued IBS for "malicious deception" concerning the status of the degrees it offered. The judgement of the Frankfurt Oberlandesgericht (Higher Regional Court) awarded the student a full refund of tuition fees, further compensatory damages, and legal costs. By that time IBS was describing itself as an "American-style management academy" and a "private alternative to the university". The degrees on offer were no longer described as "nationally and internationally recognized".

== Programmes ==
As of 2018, the school offered several bachelor's programs in business and management in cooperation with the University of Sunderland in the UK. IBS was not certified in Germany to award academic degrees. The school also has its own diploma programs in International Business Studies which do not have state certification. No further students were accepted after the 2018 summer term following IBS's announcement that it would close in 2021.
