= International Business School, Budapest =

Hungarian business school

Coordinates: 47°31′17″N 18°59′26″E

International Business School Budapest
- IBS Nemzetközi Üzleti Főiskola
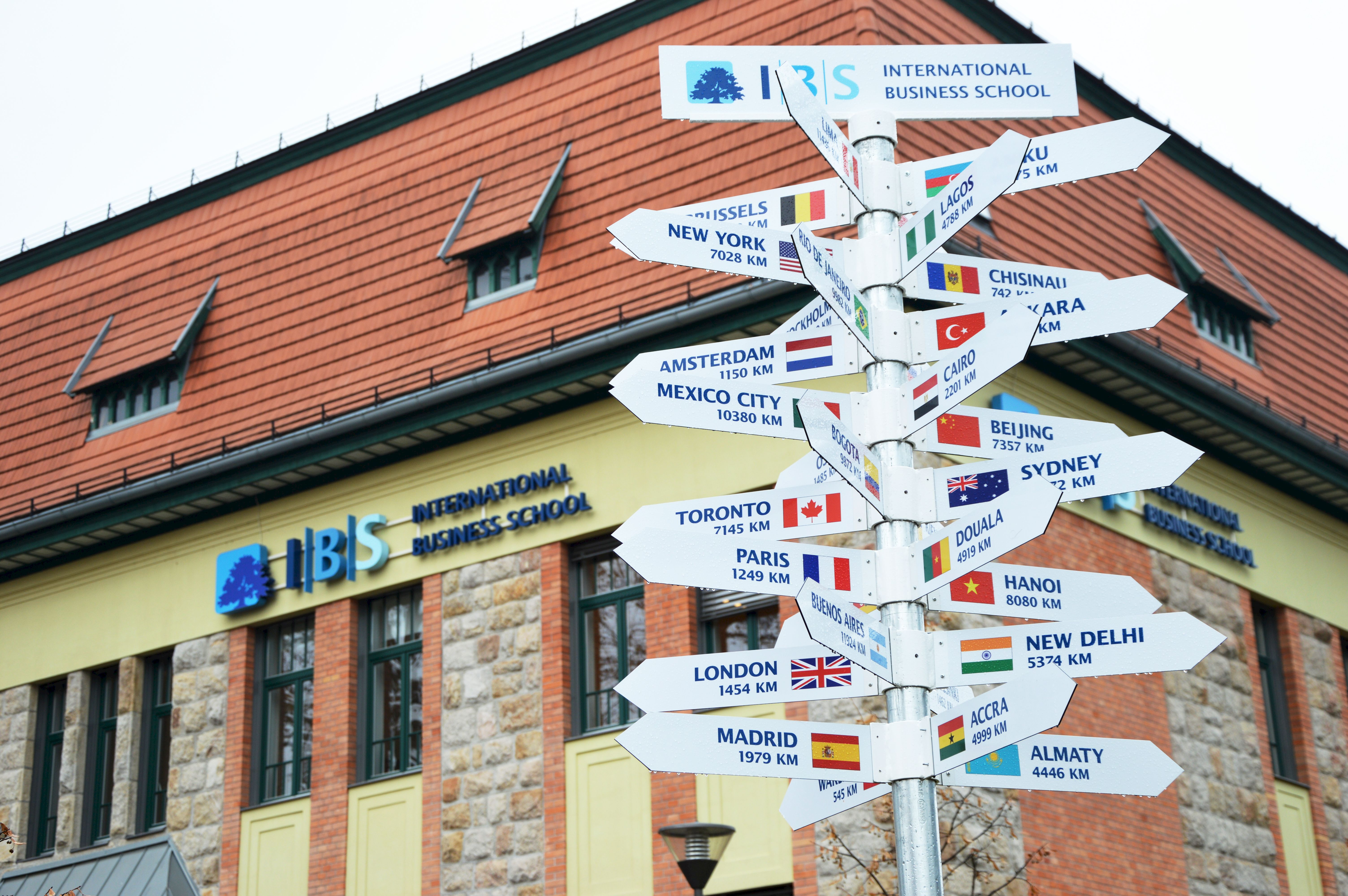
- IBS International Business School Budapest campus
- Type: Private college
- Established: 1991
- Founders: Prof. István Tamás
- Location: Záhony st. 7, 1031, Budapest, Hungary, Budapest, Hungary
- Campus: Urban
- Website: www.ibs-b.hu

International Business School (Hungarian: IBS Nemzetközi Üzleti Főiskola) is an accredited private college in Budapest, Hungary. It was founded in 1991, by Prof. István Tamás.

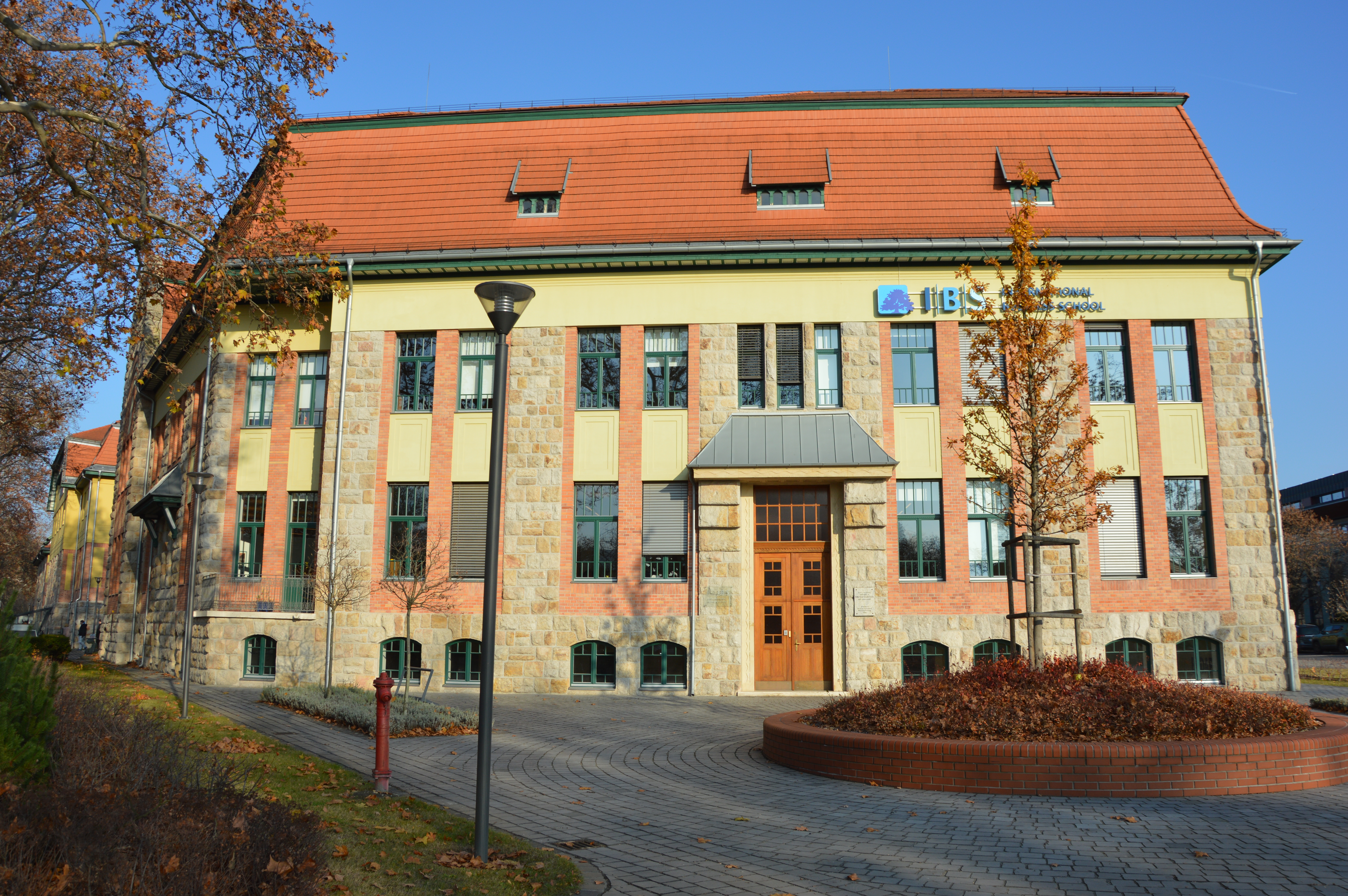
IBS International Business School Budapest campus

International Business School Budapest (Hungary) offers degree programmes in partnership with The University of Buckingham (UK) in Budapest and Vienna campuses.

It was accredited in Hungary, the UK, the EU, and the United States. The graduates of this university receive diploma of the University of Buckingham.

== Programs ==
=== Degree programmes ===
==== Undergraduate Degree Programmes ====
- BSc in Arts Management
- BSc in Business and Diplomacy
- BSc in Business and Tourism
- BSc in Financial Management
- BSc in Management
- BSc in Management with Psychology
- BSc in Management with Marketing

==== Postgraduate Degree Programmes ====
- MSc in International Management
- MSc in Financial Management
- MSc in Human Resource Management
- MSc in Marketing Management
- MSc in Strategic International Management
- MSc in IT for Business Data Analytics
- Masters by Research programmes
- PhD programmes

==== Language courses ====
- International University Foundation
- Global Gap Year

== Notable alumni ==
- Rajmund Fodor – Olympic champion water polo player
- István "Koko" Kovács – Olympic boxing champion
- Georgina Póta – European champion table tennis player
- Dániel Varga – Olympic champion water polo player
