= List of institutions accredited by AMBA =

The Association of MBAs (AMBA) has accredited MBA, DBA and MBM programmes at 277 graduate business schools in 57 countries and territories (as of 2020). Some of the accredited institutions offer programs in a further 33 countries, which expands AMBA's global presence to 85 countries. The list of 55 countries/territories below shows only the home countries of the 261 accredited business schools.

== United Kingdom ==
- London Business School, University of London
- Imperial College Business School, Imperial College London
- Bayes Business School, City, University of London
- UCL School of Management, University College London, University of London
- Brunel Business School, Brunel University London
- Cardiff Business School, Cardiff University
- Henley Business School, University of Reading
- Kent Business School
- Kingston Business School, Kingston University London
- Southampton Business School, University of Southampton
- Surrey Business School, University of Surrey
- The Open University Business School
- University of Bath School of Management
- Queen’s Business School, Queen’s University Belfast
- University of Exeter Business School
- Warwick Business School, University of Warwick
- Aston Business School, Aston University
- Birmingham Business School, University of Birmingham
- Cranfield School of Management
- Norwich Business School, University of East Anglia
- Nottingham Business School, Nottingham Trent University
- Nottingham University Business School
- Oxford Brookes University Business School
- Aberdeen Business School, Robert Gordon University
- Adam Smith Business School, University of Glasgow
- Alliance Manchester Business School, University of Manchester
- Durham University Business School
- Hull University Business School
- Lancaster University Management School
- Leeds University Business School
- Loughborough University School of Business and Economics
- Manchester Metropolitan University Business School
- Newcastle University Business School
- Sheffield University Management School
- University of Bradford School of Management
- University of Edinburgh Business School
- University of Leicester School of Management
- Strathclyde Business School, University of Strathclyde
- Essex Business School, University of Essex
- University of Liverpool Management School, University of Liverpool
- University of Sussex Business School

== Argentina ==
- IAE Universidad Austral
- Pontifical Catholic University of Argentina
- Torcuato di Tella University
- University of CEMA
- University of San Andrés

== Australia ==
- Macquarie Business School, Macquarie University
- QUT Business School, Queensland University of Technology
- Monash University Faculty of Business and Economics
- University of Sydney Business School

== Austria ==
- WU Executive Academy

== Belgium ==
- Antwerp Management School
- Solvay Brussels School of Economics and Management
- Vlerick Leuven Gent Management School

== Brazil ==
- Fundação Dom Cabral
- Getulio Vargas Foundation (FGV)
- Insper - Institute of Education and Research, São Paulo
- Institute of Management Foundation, University of São Paulo (FIA)

== Bulgaria ==
- Faculty of Economics and Business Administration (FEBA), Sofia University

== Canada ==
- HEC Montreal
- Schulich School of Business
- Telfer School of Management

== Chile ==
- Adolfo Ibáñez University
- Universidad de Chile
- Universidad del Desarrollo
- UDP - Universidad Diego Portales
- Universidad Tecnica Federico Santa Maria
- University of the Andes, Chile (ESE - Escuela de Negocios)

== China ==
- Antai College of Economics and Management, Shanghai Jiao Tong University
- Beijing Institute of Technology
- Beijing Jiaotong University
- Central South University Business School
- Central University of Finance and Economics
- Chongqing University
- Donlinks School of Economics and Management, University of Science and Technology Beijing
- East China University of Science and Technology, School of Business (ECUST)
- Guangdong University of Foreign Studies, School of Business
- Harbin Institute of Technology, School of Management (HIT)
- Hohai University Business School
- Huazhong University of Science and Technology, School of Management (HUST)
- Hunan University Business School
- Jinan University
- Lanzhou University School of Management
- Lingnan (University) College
- Nankai University
- Peking University HSBC Business School
- School of Economics and Management (SEM), Dalian University of Technology (DUT)
- Shanghai University
- Shanghai University of Finance and Economics, College of Business (SUFE)
- South China University of Technology, School of Business Administration (SCUT)
- Southwest Jiaotong University, School of Economics and Management
- Sun Yat-Sen University Business School
- Tianjin University
- Tianjin University of Finance and Economics Business School
- Tongji University, School of Economics and Management
- University of Chinese Academy of Sciences, School of Management
- University of Electronic Science and Technology of China School of Management and Economics (UESTC)
- UIBE Business School, University of International Business and Economics
- University of Science and Technology of China School of Management
- Wuhan University, School of Economics and Management
- Xiamen University
- Zhejiang University of Technology College of Economics and Management
- Zhejiang University, School of Management
- Zhongnan University of Economics and Law
- International Business School, Suzhou Xi’an Jiaotong Liverpool University
- Faculty of Business, University of Macau
- Glorious Sun School of Business and Management, Donghua University
- MBA School, Zhejiang Gongshang University
- Chinese University of Mining and Technology (CUMT)
- School of Business, Jiangnan University
- School of Business and Management, Shanghai International Studies University
- College of Economics and Management, Nanjing University of Aeronautics and Astronautics

== Colombia ==
- EAFIT University
- INALDE Business School, Universidad de la Sabana
- Universidad del Norte, Colombia
- School of Business & Economic Studies, Universidad Icesi
- Universidad de los Andes
- Universidad Externado de Colombia

== Costa Rica ==
- INCAE Business School

== Croatia ==
- Cotrugli Business School

== Czech Republic ==
- Faculty of Business Administration (FBA), Prague University of Economics and Business (VSE)

== Denmark ==
- AVT Business School
- Copenhagen Business School
- School of Business and Social Sciences, Aarhus University
- Technical University of Denmark

== Ecuador ==
- ESPAE Graduate School of Management, ESPOL Escuela Superior Politecnica del Litoral
- IDE Business School, Universidad de los Hemisferios
- USFQ Business School, Universidad San Francisco de Quito

== Egypt ==
- AUC - The American University in Cairo

== Fiji ==
- University of the South Pacific, Graduate School of Business

== Finland ==
- Aalto University School of Business
- Hanken School of Economics
- Jyväskylä University School of Business and Economics

== France ==
- Audencia Business School
- EM Strasbourg Business School
- École des Ponts Business School
- EDHEC Business School
- EMLYON Business School
- ESC Clermont Business School
- ESC Rennes
- ESSCA School of Management
- ESSEC Business School
- Excelia Business School
- Grenoble Graduate School of Business, Grenoble École de Management
- HEC Paris
- IESEG School of Management
- ICN Business School
- INSEAD
- Institut Mines-Télécom Business School
- Kedge Business School
- INSEEC Business School
- Le CNAM, International Institute of Management
- ISC Paris
- Montpellier Business School
- NEOMA Business School
- Paris School of Business
- TBS
- Ecole de Management Léonard De Vinci

== Germany ==
- Frankfurt School of Finance & Management
- Berlin Professional School, Berlin School of Economics and Law
- ESMT European School of Management and Technology
- GISMA Business School
- Mannheim Business School
- TUM School of Management

== Greece ==
- ALBA Graduate Business School
- Athens University of Economics and Business (AUEB)
- CITY College, International Faculty of the University of Sheffield

== Hong Kong ==
- Chinese University of Hong Kong (CUHK)
- Hong Kong Baptist University, School of Business

== Hungary ==
- Central European University
- Corvinus University of Budapest

== Iceland ==
- University of Iceland
- Reykjavik University School of Business

== India ==
- Goa Institute of Management
- Great Lakes Institute of Management, Chennai / Gurgaon
- IMI New Delhi
- IMI Bhubaneswar
- Indian Institute of Management Calcutta
- Indian Institute of Management Indore
- Indian Institute of Management Kozhikode
- Indian Institute of Management Tiruchirappalli
- Indian Institute of Management Lucknow
- Indian Institute of Management Bodh Gaya
- Indian Institute of Management Rohtak
- Indian School of Business
- MDI Management Development Institute
- NMIMS School of Business Management, Hyderabad / Bangalore / Indore
- SP Jain Institute of Management & Research
- T. A. Pai Management Institute
- XLRI Xavier School of Management

== Indonesia ==
- Faculty of Economics and Business, University of Indonesia

== Ireland ==
- Cork University Business School, University College Cork
- DCU Business School, Dublin City University
- DIT College of Business Graduate Business School
- J.E. Cairnes School of Business & Economics, NUI Galway
- Kemmy Business School, University of Limerick
- Trinity College Dublin School of Business
- UCD Michael Smurfit Graduate Business School, University College Dublin

== Italy ==
- MIB - School of Management
- Luiss Business School
- SDA Bocconi School of Management
- POLIMI Graduate School of Management

== Jamaica ==
- Mona School of Business, The University of the West Indies, Kingston

== Japan ==
- NUCB Business School, Nagoya University of Commerce & Business
- Ritsumeikan Asia Pacific University
- Doshisha University, Doshisha Business School
- Chuo University, Business School (Chuo Graduate School of Strategic Management)

== Kazakhstan ==
- Almaty Management University

== Lebanon ==
- ESA Lebanon

== Lithuania ==
- Vilnius University Business School

== Luxembourg ==
- Business Science Institute Luxembourg

== Malaysia ==
- University of Malaya
- Universiti Utara Malaysia

== Mexico ==
- EGADE Business School
- IPADE Business School, Universidad Panamericana
- ITAM Instituto Tecnológico Autónomo de México
- Universidad Anahuac, Facultad de Economía y Negocios
- Universidad de Monterrey, Facultad de Economía y Negocios
- Instituto Tecnologico de Estudios Superiores de Occidente (ITESO MBA Programm)

== Monaco ==
- International University of Monaco

== Morocco ==
- Ecole Hassania des Travaux Publics
- ISCAE

== Netherlands ==
- University of Amsterdam Faculty of Economics and Business
- Maastricht School of Management
- Maastricht University School of Business and Economics
- Nyenrode Business Universiteit
- Rotterdam School of Management
- TIAS School for Business and Society

== New Zealand ==
- Massey University
- The University of Waikato Management School
- University of Auckland Business School
- University of Canterbury
- Victoria University of Wellington

== Nigeria ==
- Lagos Business School

== Norway ==
- BI Norwegian Business School
- NHH Norwegian School of Economics

== Peru ==
- CENTRUM Catolica
- ESAN Graduate School of Business
- Universidad del Pacifico
- Universidad de Piura - PAD Escuela de Direccion

== Poland ==
- Faculty of Economic Sciences and Management, Nicolaus Copernicus University
- Faculty of Management, University of Warsaw
- Gdańsk University of Technology
- Kozminski University
- Poznan University of Economics
- SGH Warsaw School of Economics
- Wrocław University of Economics, Wrocław_University_of_Economics

== Portugal ==
- AESE Business School
- Católica Lisbon School of Business & Economics
- Católica Porto Business School
- INDEG-ISCTE Executive Education, Instituto Universitário de Lisboa
- ISEG Lisbon School of Economics and Management, Universidade de Lisboa
- Nova School of Business and Economics
- Porto Business School

== Romania ==
- Bucharest University of Economic Studies

== Russia ==
- Faculty of International MBA Programs, Institute for Social Sciences, RANEPA
- GSCM Graduate School of Corporate Management
- Higher Business School, State University of Management
- Institute of Business Studies, RANEPA
- Institute of Industry Management, RANEPA
- Institute of Public Administration and Civil Service (IPACS), RANEPA
- International Institute of Management LINK
- International Management Institute of St. Petersburg (IMISP)
- Kazan Federal University MBA Higher School
- Moscow State Institute of International Relations (MGIMO)
- MIRBIS Moscow International Higher Business School
- Plekhanov Business School Integral, Plekhanov Russian University of Economics
- Saint Petersburg State University Graduate School of Management
- Synergy Business School, Synergy University

== Singapore ==
- Singapore Management University (SMU)

== Slovenia ==
- IEDC Bled School of Management
- University of Ljubljana, Faculty of Economics

== South Africa ==
- Gordon Institute of Business Science, University of Pretoria
- Nelson Mandela Metropolitan University Business School
- School of Business and Governance, North-West University
- Rhodes Business School, Rhodes University
- University of Cape Town Graduate School of Business
- University of Stellenbosch Business School
- Wits Business School, University of the Witwatersrand
- Milpark Business School

== Spain ==
- ca:UPF Barcelona School of Management, Pompeu Fabra University (UPF BSM)
- Deusto Business School, University of Deusto
- EADA - Escuela de Alta Direccion y Administracion
- ESADE Business School
- IE Business School
- Universidad Carlos III de Madrid
- ESIC Business & Marketing School

== Sweden ==
- School of Business, Economics and Law, University of Gothenburg
- School of Economics and Management, Lund University
- Stockholm Business School, Stockholm University

== Switzerland ==
- EPFL - École Polytechnique Fédérale de Lausanne
- Geneva School of Economics and Management, Université de Genève
- HEC Lausanne, University of Lausanne
- IMD Business School
- University of St. Gallen

== Thailand ==
- Thammasat Business School, Thammasat University

== Trinidad & Tobago ==
- Arthur Lok Jack Graduate School of Business, The University of the West Indies

== Tunisia ==
- Mediterranean School of Business

== Turkey ==
- Graduate School of Business, Koç University
- Sabancı Business School, Sabancı University

== Ukraine ==
- IIB - International Institute of Business
- International Management Institute (MIM-Kyiv)

== Uruguay ==
- Facultad de Administracion y Ciencias Sociales (FACS)
- Instituto de Estudios Empresariales de Montevideo (IEEM)

== United States ==
- Hult International Business School
- Miami Herbert Business School at the University of Miami
- Olin Business School at Washington University in St. Louis

== Venezuela ==
- Instituto de Estudios Superiores de Administración

== See also ==
- Association of MBAs
- Triple accreditation
