= South Mediterranean University =

English-speaking university in Tunis, Tunisia

- Type: Private
- Established: 2002; 24 years ago
- Founders: Mahmoud Triki
- Accreditation: European Quality Improvement System (EQUIS), the Association to Advance Collegiate Schools of Business (AACSB), and the Association of MBAs (AMBA)
- President: Mahmoud Triki
- Location: Tunis, Tunisia; 36.845798°N 10.269064°E
- Campus: Berges du Lac (Tunis)
- Language: English
- Website: www.smu.tn

South Mediterranean University was founded in 2002 and it is located in the Berges du Lac district of Tunis. It is the first English-speaking university in Tunisia. The university has benefited from the support of its founding members, which include companies, business leaders, professionals, and Tunisian academics. To ensure the university’s academic independence, no founding member was granted binding voting rights.

SMU consists of four institutions: a business school (Mediterranean School of Business), an engineering school (Mediterranean Institute of Technology), a cultural institute (Culture and Language Institute), and a school for health professionals (Mediterranean School of Health).

SMU offers undergraduate engineering programs, languages master’s programs, as well as professional seminars delivered in English. The university has developed partnerships and exchange programs with various North American, European, Asian, and African universities, including the University of South Florida, Emporia State University, HEC Montréal, IÉSEG School of Management, Libera Università Internazionale degli Studi Sociali, Ritsumeikan Asia Pacific University, ESC Rennes School of Business, Kedge Business School, Nova School of Business and Economics, University of Hertfordshire, EM Normandie Business School, Portuguese Catholic University, the American University in Cairo, Instituto de Empresa, Hult International Business School, ESIC University, and Escuela de Alta Dirección y Administración. It also partners with Babson College, University of Maryland, University of Massachusetts, and University of South Carolina.

== See also ==
- List of universities in Tunisia
- List of schools in Tunisia
- Education in Tunisia
