= Mediterranean School of Business =

Business school in Tunisia

Coordinates: 36.8458°N 10.2691°E

- Established: 2002
- Founder: Mahmoud Triki
- Accreditation: AMBA, EFMD, EQUIS, AACSB, CFA, Triple accreditation
- Affiliations: South Mediterranean University
- Dean: Leila Triki
- Administrative staff: 200
- Location: 9, Avenue de l'Euro Jar Lac, Jardins Lac 2 1053, Tunis, Tunisia, Tunis, Tunisia
- Language: English
- Website: https://www.smu.tn/msb/

The Mediterranean School of Business is the first and only business school with the prestigious international Triple crown accreditation in Tunisia, by the European Quality Improvement System (EQUIS), the Association to Advance Collegiate Schools of Business (AACSB), and the Association of MBAs (AMBA).

Established in 2002, its competitive admissions requirements along with its distinguished and reputable faculty members, earned it its consistent rank as the top business school in Tunisia. MSB is the first business school among the French-teaching academic institutions with programs and activities fully in English: from courses, to clubs, events and team building activities. Students applying for the undergraduate, graduate and EMBA programs are met with rigorous English language requirements as well as a meticulous grades, résumé and profile assessment from the admissions office.

Situated in Les Berges du Lac 2, it is part of South Mediterranean University, the first English speaking educational hub in Tunisia, offering management and engineering studies, with an upcoming medical studies program with a brand new building and clinic.

Its Executive MBA Program is the first and only MBA Program in Tunisia accredited by the London-based Association of MBAs (AMBA). MSB offers its students exchange opportunities and double-master degrees abroad as it partners with different universities all over the world. Indeed, MSB developed partnerships and exchange programs with various North American, European, Asian and African universities, including the University of South Florida, Emporia State University, HEC Montréal, Luiss University, Ritsumeikan Asia Pacific University, ESC Rennes School of Business, KEDGE Business School, IÉSEG, Nova School of Business and Economics, University of Hertfordshire, EM Normandie, University of Groningen, Catholic University of Portugal, The American University in Cairo and IE Business School.

MSB students can also obtain a double degree from both SMU and from one of its partner universities, including the ESC Rennes School of Business, Hult International Business School, ESIC University, HEC Montréal and EADA Business School.

== See also ==
- List of business schools in Africa
- Education in Tunisia
- List of Arab universities
- List of colleges and universities
