= Triple accreditation =

List of triple-accredited business schools in the world

Triple accreditation or triple crown accreditation is the simultaneous accreditation of a business school by the three major international accreditation organisations: the Association to Advance Collegiate Schools of Business (AACSB) in the US, the Association of MBAs (AMBA) in the UK, and EFMD Quality Improvement System (EQUIS) in Belgium.

== Criteria ==
Triple accreditation accreditors

Association to Advance Collegiate Schools of Business in the United States

Association of MBAs in the United Kingdom

EFMD Quality Improvement System in Belgium

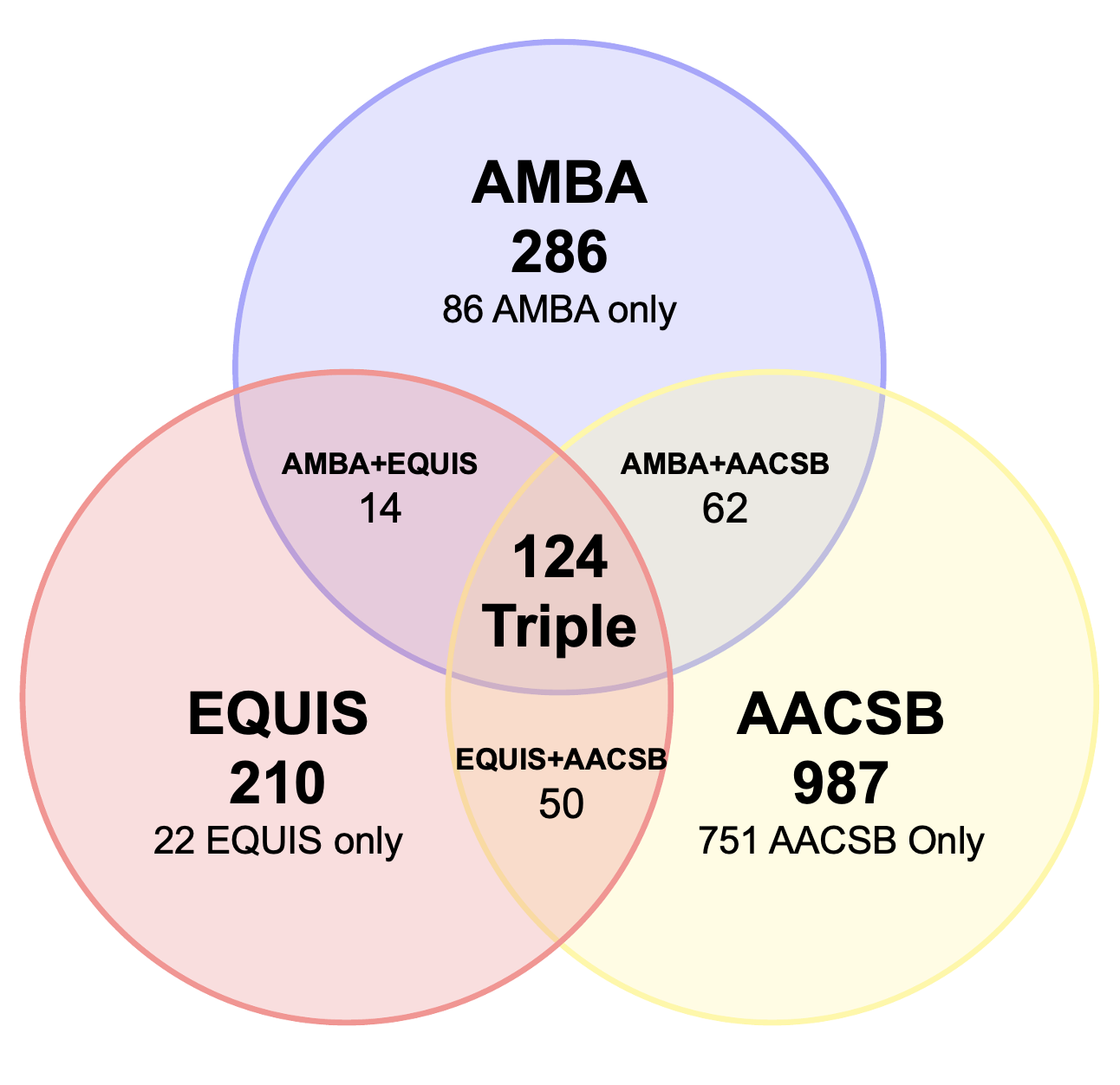
Number of schools worldwide with single, double and triple (AACSB-AMBA-EQUIS) accreditation in 2023

Each of the three institutions assesses a business school according to different criteria and scope:

- AACSB (United States) accreditation looks at the whole business school and is intended to "signify a business school's commitment to strategic management, learner success, thought leadership, and societal impact". There has been a greater emphasis on diversity and inclusion since the 2020 revision.
- AMBA (United Kingdom) accreditation examines the Master of Business Administration programme portfolio and is intended to show that this "demonstrates the highest standards in teaching, learning and curriculum design, career development and employability, student, alumni and employer interaction".
- EQUIS (Belgium) accreditation also looks at the whole business school, and is intended to "signal the school’s overall quality, viability and self-improvement commitment".

== Accreditation in the US ==
Most business schools in the United States chose to only pursue AACSB accreditation. The structure of United States business schools' MBA programs often does not align with European standards. For example, AMBA accreditation criteria require all MBA students to have a minimum of three years of postgraduate work experience. This is a requirement that the vast majority of top United States business schools do not meet, as their MBA programs also admit applicants with a bachelor's degree and no work experience.

== By country ==
A total of 149 business schools from around the world were triple-accredited as of 7 February 2026.

=== Argentina ===
- IAE Universidad Austral, Buenos Aires

=== Australia ===
- Monash University, Monash Business School, Melbourne
- Queensland University of Technology, QUT Business School, Brisbane
- University of Sydney Business School, University of Sydney

=== Austria ===
- Vienna University of Economics and Business, Vienna

=== Belgium ===
- Antwerp Management School, Antwerp
- Vlerick Business School, Ghent

=== Brazil ===
- EAESP - Fundação Getulio Vargas, São Paulo
- EBAPE - Fundação Getúlio Vargas, Rio de Janeiro
- Insper, São Paulo

=== Canada ===
- HEC Montréal, Montreal
- University of Ottawa, Telfer School of Management, Ottawa

=== Chile ===
- Adolfo Ibáñez University, Santiago
- Pontifical Catholic University of Chile, Santiago

=== China ===
- Beijing Institute of Technology
- Beijing Jiaotong University, School of Economics and Management
- Chongqing University, School of Economics and Business Administration
- Dalian University of Technology
- East China University of Science and Technology, ECUST School of Business
- Huazhong University of Science and Technology, School of Management
- Hunan University Business School
- Peking University, Peking HSBC Business School
- Shanghai Jiao Tong University, Antai College of Economics and Management
- Shanghai University of Finance and Economics
- Sun Yat-sen University, Sun Yat-sen Business School
- University of Chinese Academy of Sciences, School of Economics and Management
- University of International Business and Economics
- University of Science and Technology Beijing, School of Economics and Management
- Wuhan University Economics and Management School
- Xiamen University School of Management
- Xi'an Jiaotong–Liverpool University, International Business School Suzhou
- Zhejiang University School of Management

=== Colombia ===
- University of the Andes, Facultad de Administración, Bogotá

=== Costa Rica ===
- INCAE Business School, Alajuela

=== Croatia ===
- University of Zagreb, Faculty of Economics and Business

=== Czech Republic ===
- Prague University of Economics and Business, Prague

=== Denmark ===
- Aarhus University, School of Business and Social Sciences, Aarhus
- Copenhagen Business School, Copenhagen

=== Egypt ===
- American University in Cairo, Cairo

=== Finland ===
- Aalto University School of Business, Espoo
- Hanken School of Economics, Helsinki and Vaasa

=== France ===
- Audencia Nantes
- Burgundy School of Business
- EDHEC Business School
- EM Lyon Business School
- EM Normandie Business School
- EM Strasbourg Business School
- ESC Rennes School of Business
- ESSCA School of Management
- ESSEC Business School
- Excelia Business School
- Grenoble School of Management
- HEC Paris
- ICN Business School
- IÉSEG School of Management
- INSEAD
- KEDGE Business School
- Montpellier Business School
- NEOMA Business School
- Paris School of Business
- TBS Education

=== Germany ===
- European School of Management and Technology
- Frankfurt School of Finance & Management
- Mannheim Business School
- TUM School of Management

=== Hong Kong ===
- Hong Kong Baptist University, School of Business

=== Hungary ===
- Corvinus University of Budapest

=== India ===
- Indian Institute of Management Calcutta
- Indian Institute of Management Indore
- Indian School of Business
- Management Development Institute
- S. P. Jain Institute of Management and Research
- Indian Institute of Management Lucknow
- XLRI – Xavier School of Management

=== Ireland ===
- Cork University Business School
- DCU Business School, Dublin City University
- Kemmy Business School, University of Limerick
- Michael Smurfit Graduate Business School, University College Dublin
- J.E. Cairnes School of Business and Economics, University of Galway
- Trinity Business School, Trinity College Dublin

=== Italy ===
- LUISS Business School, Rome
- POLIMI Graduate School of Management, Milan
- SDA Bocconi School of Management, Milan

=== Japan ===
- NUCB Business School, Nagoya, Tokyo, Osaka

=== Macau ===
- University of Macau, Faculty of Business Administration

=== Malaysia ===
- Universiti Putra Malaysia, School of Business and Economics

=== Mexico ===
- EGADE Business School, Monterrey, Guadalajara and Mexico City
- Instituto Tecnológico Autónomo de México, Mexico City
- IPADE Business School, Monterrey, Guadalajara and Mexico City

=== Morocco ===
- International University of Rabat, Rabat Business School

=== Netherlands ===
- Erasmus University Rotterdam, Rotterdam School of Management
- Maastricht University School of Business and Economics
- Nyenrode Business University
- TIAS School for Business and Society
- University of Amsterdam, Amsterdam Business School

=== New Zealand ===
- Victoria University of Wellington, Victoria Business School, Wellington
- University of Auckland Business School
- University of Canterbury Business School
- University of Waikato, Waikato Management School
- University of Otago business school

=== Norway ===
- BI Norwegian Business School
- Norwegian School of Economics

=== Peru ===
- Pontifical Catholic University of Peru CENTRUM Graduate Business School, Lima

=== Poland ===
- Kozminski University, Warsaw
- SGH Warsaw School of Economics, Warsaw
- University of Warsaw, Faculty of Management

=== Portugal ===
- Católica Lisbon School of Business & Economics
- Católica Porto Business School
- ISEG - Lisbon School of Economics and Management, University of Lisbon
- Nova School of Business and Economics

=== Singapore ===
- Singapore Management University, Lee Kong Chian School of Business

=== Slovenia ===
- School of Economics and Business, Ljubljana

=== South Africa ===
- University of Cape Town, Graduate School of Business, Cape Town
- University of Pretoria, Gordon Institute of Business Science, Johannesburg
- University of Stellenbosch Business School, Bellville

=== South Korea ===
- Yonsei University School of Business, Seoul

=== Spain ===
- ESADE Business School, Barcelona
- IE Business School, Madrid

=== Sweden ===
- Gothenburg School of Business, Economics and Law, Gothenburg
- Jönköping International Business School, Jönköping
- Lund School of Economics and Management, Lund

=== Switzerland ===
- IMD Business School, Lausanne
- University of St. Gallen
- ZHAW School of Management and Law

=== Thailand ===
- Chulalongkorn University, Chulalongkorn Business school
- Thammasat University, Thammasat Business School

=== Tunisia ===
- Mediterranean School of Business, Tunis

=== Turkey ===
- Koç University, Istanbul

=== United Kingdom ===
- Aston Business School, Aston University
- Bayes Business School, City St George's, University of London
- Birmingham Business School, University of Birmingham
- University of Bradford School of Management, University of Bradford
- Cranfield School of Management, Cranfield University
- Durham University Business School, Durham University
- University of Edinburgh Business School
- University of Exeter Business School
- Adam Smith Business School, University of Glasgow
- Imperial Business School, Imperial College London
- Kent Business School, University of Kent
- King's Business School, King's College London
- Lancaster University Management School
- Leeds University Business School
- University of Liverpool Management School
- London Business School
- Loughborough University, School of Business and Economics
- Alliance Manchester Business School, University of Manchester
- Manchester Metropolitan University Business School
- Newcastle University Business School
- Nottingham University Business School
- Nottingham Business School, Nottingham Trent University
- Open University Business School, Open University
- Queen's Business School, Queen's University Belfast
- Henley Business School, University of Reading
- University of Sheffield Management School
- Strathclyde Business School, University of Strathclyde
- Warwick Business School, University of Warwick

=== United States ===
- Hult International Business School
- University of Miami, Miami Herbert Business School

== See also ==
- List of AACSB-accredited institutions
- List of AMBA-accredited institutions
- List of EQUIS accredited institutions
