= Nottingham University Business School =

UK business school

Coordinates: 52.9517°N 1.1866°W

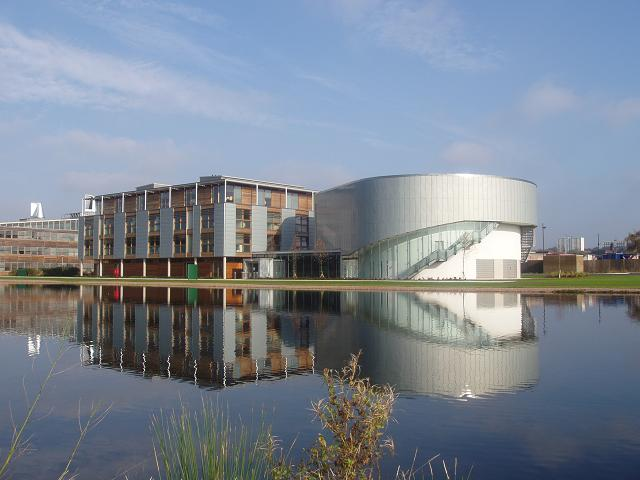
- South Building, Jubilee Campus
- Type: Public
- Parent institution: University of Nottingham
- Accreditation: AMBA, EQUIS, AACSB
- Location: Nottingham, United Kingdom
- Campus: Urban
- Website: http://www.nottingham.ac.uk/business

Nottingham University Business School (NUBS) is the business school of the University of Nottingham, United Kingdom situated on the university's Jubilee Campus, close to Nottingham city centre.

The school has three campuses in the UK, China and Malaysia. It is among a group of international business schools that hold triple accreditation from the leading accrediting organisations: AACSB, AMBA and EQUIS.

== History ==
=== List of deans ===
- Leigh Drake (2007–2010)
- Martin Binks (2010–2015)
- Alistair Bruce (2015–2017)
- James Devlin (2017–2019)
- Duncan Angwin (2019–2023)
- David Park (2023–present)

== Organisation ==
=== Academic departments ===
Research and teaching on the business school's UK campus is organised into six academic departments:

- Entrepreneurship, sustainability and innovation
- Finance, accounting and banking
- Industrial economics
- Marketing, tourism and analytics
- Operations management and information systems
- Work, organisation and management

The China campus has three academic departments:

- Entrepreneurship, marketing and management systems
- Finance, accounting and economics
- International business and management

The Malaysia campus is not organised into departments but instead into research clusters.

=== Research centres and institutes ===
The UK campus is home to eight research centres:

- Centre for health innovation, leadership and learning
- Centre for private equity and MBO research
- Centre for research in the behavioural sciences
- Centre for society, nature and organisations
- Haydn Green institute for innovation and entrepreneurship
- Global centre for banking and financial innovation
- N/LAB
- Sustainable travel and tourism advanced research centre

There are also six research centres on the China campus:

- Centre for inclusive finance
- Ningbo centre for new structural economics
- Nottingham China health institute
- UNNC–NFTZ blockchain laboratory
- Zhejiang provincial branding academy
- AHRC centre

The four research clusters on the Malaysia campus are:

- Accounting, finance and law
- Business analytics and economics
- Marketing, entrepreneurship, innovation and international business
- Organisations, leadership, strategy and sustainability

== Academic profile ==
=== Degree programmes ===
Nottingham University Business School offers undergraduate, master's and PhD degrees at all of its campuses. The UK campus also offers full-time MBAs, executive MBAs and executive education programmes, while the China campus offers part-time MBAs and the Malaysia campus offers executive MBAs.

=== Reputation and rankings ===
Business school rankings

Europe MBA Rankings
- QS (2026): 50=
- FT (2026): NR

Global MBA Rankings
- QS (2026): 141–150
- FT (2026): NR

Nottingham University Business School's MBA programme was ranked joint 50th in Europe and 141–150 globally by QS World University Rankings in 2025. It did not feature in the Financial Times global or European MBA rankings for 2025.

The Corporate Knights 2025 Better World MBA ranking rated Nottingham University Business School 16th globally for sustainability research and education.
