= University of Bradford School of Management =

English business school

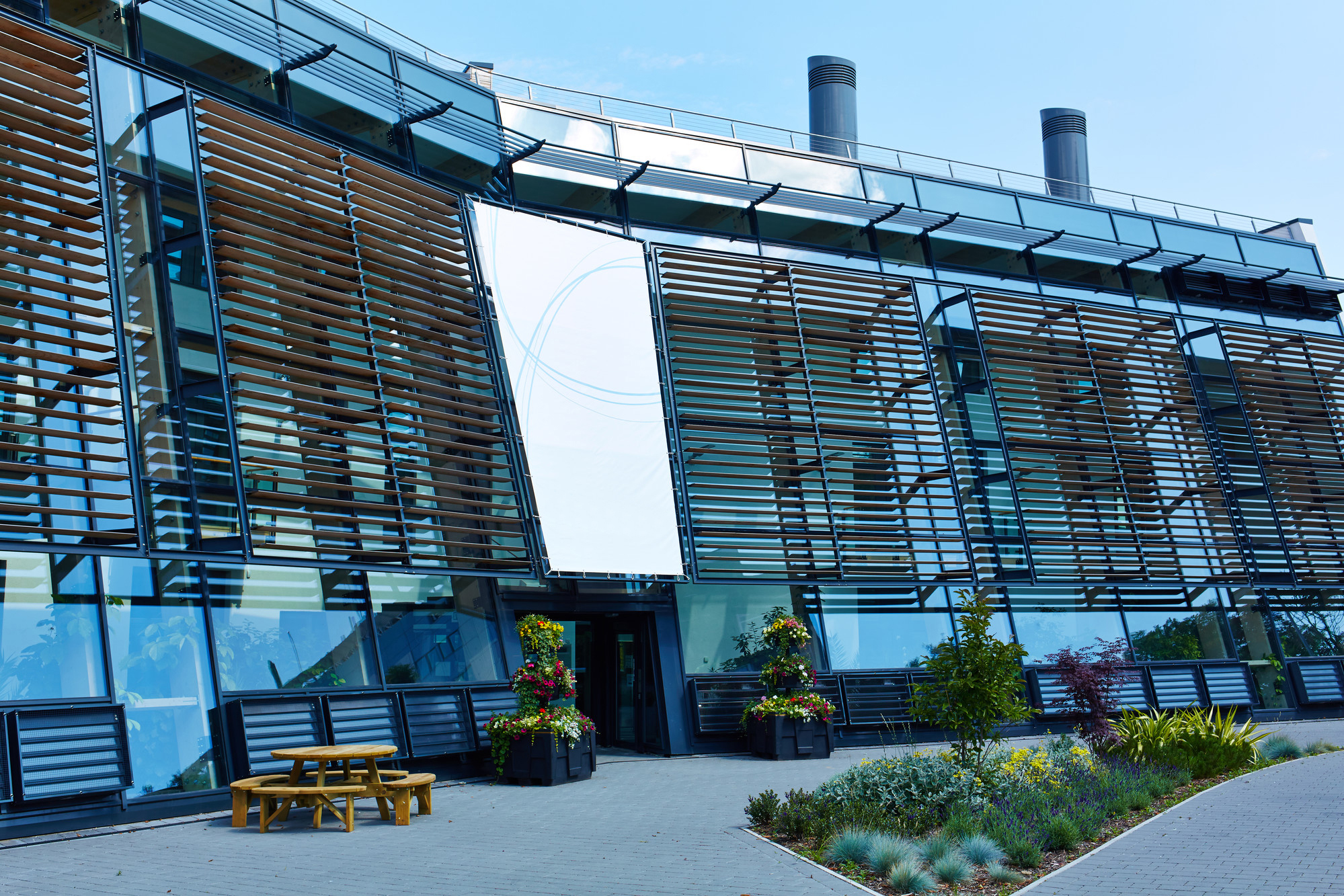
- University of Bradford School of Management at City Campus
- Type: Business School
- Established: 1963
- Dean: Professor Yvonne Moogan
- Academic staff: 75
- Students: 2,500
- Location: Bradford, West Yorkshire, England; 53.816°N 1.777°W
- Website: www.bradford.ac.uk/management/

University of Bradford School of Management is an international business school located in Bradford, West Yorkshire, England. It was established in 1963 and is one of the oldest business schools in the UK, celebrating its 60th anniversary in 2023. The school is triple accredited by AACSB, AMBA and EQUIS.

Until summer 2019 it occupied buildings near Lister Park. The school was relocated to the University of Bradford City Campus for teaching in September 2019.

The School of Management is believed to be the origin of the Bradford factor, an absence review technique in HRM.

== Introduction ==
The School of Management provides undergraduate, postgraduate and doctoral degrees in management, including MBA (Master of Business Administration) courses; as well as non-degree courses for business executives.

Currently, the school has over 2,500 students across 25 degree programmes. 65% of the students within the School of Management were international students in 2022/23. The current establishment of the school is some 75 academic faculty with 20 support staff who represent 18 nationalities.

Around 80 students graduate from the full-time MBA each year and 25 from the part-time MBA. The school also offers part-time Executive MBA courses for around 50 students per year and courses abroad such as the Dubai MBA, as well as a master's degree in finance, international business, management, accounting, and HRM. The MBA will be celebrating its 50th anniversary at the School of Management in 2024 as a founding member of the programme.

== Accreditation ==
The Business School is triple accredited by European Quality Improvement System (EQUIS), Association to Advance Collegiate Schools of Business (AACSB) and Association of MBAs (AMBA), which is often referred to as the Triple Crown accreditation.

The school has achieved the advanced signatory status of the UN Principles of Responsible Management Education (PRME) 2020 and also adheres to the revised principle of the Athena SWAN.

== Ranking ==
According to the Financial Times, the School of Management is ranked 9th in the UK. Worldwide, the school is ranked in 95th place in the Financial Times Global MBA Rankings 2012. The distance learning MBA program is ranked by the Economist Intelligence Unit 10th in the World.

In 2018, it was ranked as the 14th best overall in the world, 3rd best in the UK and best in the world when it comes to value for money for Online MBA in business schools by Financial Times.

In 2021, the University of Bradford School of Management was awarded as the best Business School of the year 2021 in the UK by the Times Higher Education's THE Awards.

In addition, the school hold a number of other awards and rankings including;

- Runner-up, Triple E Awards 2022 (The Accreditation Council for Entrepreneurial and Engaged Universities) in the category of Community Engagement Initiative of the Year by ACEEU.
- Winner, Educate North Awards, Business School of the Year 2020 in recognition of outstanding performance in the areas of student experience, innovation and societal impact.
- Distance Learning MBA is positioned 1st globally for value for money, 4th highest for the number of international students, and 4th highest for international mobility in the Financial Times Online MBA Rankings 2022.
- In 2021 the school achieved Small Business Charter initial accreditation by Chartered Association of Business Schools (CABS), UK.
- In 2020 the school achieved the Business Graduates Association (BGA) initial accreditation, becoming the first business school in England to receive joint accreditation from AMBA & BGA.
- In 2022 the school received 5/5 ratings in Teaching, Research, Happiness and Wellbeing, Employability and Programme Strength from the Knowledge and Human Development Authority (KHDA) Assessment in Dubai for Higher Education Rating.

== Courses ==
Courses taught at the school include postgraduate degrees (MBA, Masters, and Research programmes) and undergraduate degrees (such as BSc Business and Management Studies)
