= Clermont School of Business =

Business school in Clermont-Ferrand, France

- Clermont School of Business
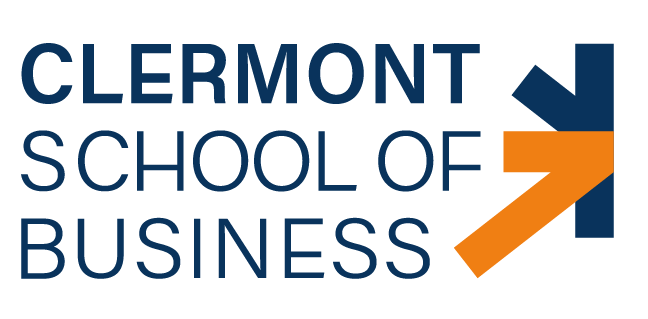
- Motto: School For Life
- Type: Grande école de commerce et de management (Private research university Business school)
- Established: 1919; 107 years ago
- Accreditation: Triple accreditation: AACSB; AMBA; EFMD;
- Affiliations: Conférence des grandes écoles
- Director: Richard SOPARNOT
- Students: 2,043
- Location: Clermont-Ferrand, France; 45.778°N 3.091°E
- Language: English-only & French-only instruction
- Website: www.esc-clermont.fr/en

Clermont School of Business (ex ESC Clermont Business School) is a business school located in the city of Clermont-Ferrand, France. Established in 1919, the school of management is a Grande Ecole recognized by the French Ministry of Higher Education and Research. The business school holds AACSB accreditation since 2005 and its Bachelor programme received EPAS accreditation in 2018. The school obtained the AMBA accreditation in 2020. It offers undergraduate and postgraduate programmes.

The school is part of Conférence des Grandes écoles, the Consortium of Graduate Schools of Management.

The school has an alumni network of over 13,000 graduates.

== History ==
Founded in 1919, ESC Clermont was established in the city of Clermont-Ferrand. Since then, the business school has graduated 13,000 students.

The business school merged with three other French graduate management schools: ESC Amiens, ESCEM and ESC Brest to form France Business School in 2013. ESC Clermont broke from the merger and regained its independence in 2015. ESC Clermont is a founding member of the ENBS (European Network of Business Schools) Consortium, an exclusive network of universities and business schools covering different European countries. The school is also a member of the NIBES network which is a global network of 20 Business and Economic Schools in 19 countries.

In 2016 it launched a foundation as part of it strategic project Vision 2020. The foundation is intended to reinforce social openness and equal opportunities, boost research and innovation, support entrepreneurship, and encourage professional integration in the business world.

== Accreditations ==
ESC Clermont is a Grande école, a French institution of higher education that is separate from, but parallel and connected to the main framework of the French public university system. Similar to the Ivy League in the United States, Oxbridge in the UK, and C9 League in China, Grandes Écoles are elite academic institutions that admit students through an extremely competitive process. Alums go on to occupy elite positions within government, administration, and corporate firms in France.

Although they are more expensive than public universities in France, Grandes Écoles typically have much smaller class sizes and student bodies, and many of their programs are taught in English. International internships, study abroad opportunities, and close ties with government and the corporate world are a hallmark of the Grandes Écoles. Many of the top ranked business schools in Europe are members of the Conférence des Grandes Écoles (CGE), as is ESC Clermont, and out of the 250 business schools in France, only 39 are CGE members.

Degrees from ESC Clermont are accredited by the Conférence des Grandes Écoles and awarded by the Ministry of National Education (France)(French: Le Ministère de L'éducation Nationale). ESC Clermont is further triply accredited by the elite international business school accrediting organizations: The Association to Advance Collegiate Schools of Business (AACSB), Association of MBAs (AMBA) and European Foundation for Management Development.

== Rankings ==
=== International Rankings ===
In 2022, the Financial Times ranked the Masters in Management program 95th in the world. As of 2016, ESC Clermont was ranked 86th business school in the world according to the "Financial Times Ranking" issued by the Financial Times newspaper (FT). The school was ranked as the 67th best business school in the FT ranking in 2011, and continued to be among the top 100 business schools in Europe till date.

ESC Clermont is also featured in the QS ranking for business schools since it was first published in 2017.

Ranking	Programme	Rank
Financial Times (2023)	Master in Management	67
Financial Times (2022)	Master in Management	93
Financial Times (2017)	European Business School Rankings	90
Financial Times (2017)	Master in Management	92
QS World University Rankings (2018)	Master in Management	73
QS World University Rankings (2019)	Master in Management	93

=== National Rankings in France ===
Ranking	Programme	Rank
business cool (2023)	Ranking of business schools 2023 – Special CAC 40	10
Le Figaro (2023)	Ranking of business schools – Master programme	25
Le Figaro (2022)	Ranking of business schools – Master programme	28
Le Point (2023)	Master programme	24
Le Point (2022)	Master programme	24
L'Etudiant (2024)	Ranking of business schools	21
L'Etudiant (2022)	Ranking of business schools – Bachelor programme	10
Le Parisien (2023)	Ranking of business schools – Master programme	17
Le Parisien (2023)	Ranking of business schools – Bachelor programme	9
Challenges (2022)	Ranking of business schools	20
Le Monde (2018)	Ranking of business schools – Master programme	29
Challenges (2018)	Bachelor	21
Le Moci (2018)	Bachelor	6

== Accreditations and networks ==
On the international level, ESC Clermont Business School is:

- AACSB-accredited (Association to advance collegiate schools of business),
- AMBA-accredited (Association of MBAs),
- EPAS-accredited – Bachelor (EFMD Programme Accreditation System),
- founding member of EMBS network (European Master in Business Sciences),
- member of the EFMD (European Foundation for Management Development),
- member of EAIE (European Association for International Education),
- member of NIBES (Network of International Business and Economic Schools),

On the national and regional level, Groupe ESC Clermont is:

- member of Conférence des Grandes Ecoles,
- member of l’AGERA,
- labelled as “Campus Région du Numérique” by the Auvergne Rhône-Alpes Region.

In 2017, the (Business School Impact Survey) carried out by the FNEGE valued the economic impact of the school at 69 million euros in the metropolitan region of Clermont-Vichy Auvergne.

== Programmes offered ==
Undergraduate programmes include a three-year Bachelor in International Management, available in English or French. The degree can also be granted as a third-year-only programme to students who transfer to the school after two years of undergraduate studies elsewhere.

Two postgraduate degrees are offered: Master in Management and Master of Science. Master in Management is a two-year programme, offered in English or French, with several study tracks, specialisations, and work environments. The Master of Science programme, offered in English only, is a 16- to 18-month programme and includes an internship and a professional thesis. Also DBA (Doctorate in Business Administration).
