= International Management Institute of Saint Petersburg =

Russian management school

IMISP Business School
- Санкт-Петербургский Международный Институт Менеджмента ИМИСП
- Motto: Evolve with the Greatest
- Type: Private business school
- Established: 1989
- President: Sergey Mordovin
- Rector: Yaroslav Pavlov
- Address: 9th line V.O., building 50, Saint Petersburg, Russia
- Website: imisp.ru/en/

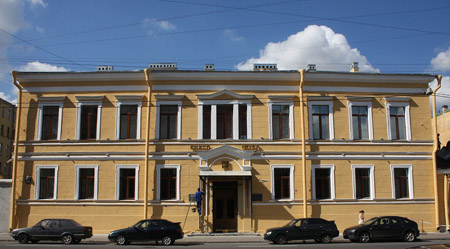
International Management Institute building in 2011

International Management Institute of Saint Petersburg (IMISP; Санкт-Петербургский международный институт менеджмента; ИМИСП) is a management school in Saint Petersburg, Russia.

IMISP is the first Business School to be founded in St. Petersburg and one of the first in the territory of the former Soviet Union, established on 20 July 1989 as a joint venture between Leningrad State University (now – St Petersburg State University) and the Bocconi University (Milan, Italy).

IMISP was ranked as one of Russia's top three business schools according to international ratings (Eduniversal, 2011–19) and a leader (first or second) among the top-20 and top-30 Russian schools according to independent Russian ratings (Kommersant, 2007–08.

== Accreditations ==
- CEEMAN IQA (International) Accreditation since 2001. (The first Russian business school to be awarded by CEEMAN accreditation organization)
- AMBA (International) Accreditation since 2006. List of institutions accredited by AMBA.
- BGA (International) Accreditation since 2019 (The first Russian business school to obtain Joint AMBA & BGA Accreditation).
- EQUAA (International) Accreditation since 2019 (The first Russian business school to obtain EQUAA-CEEMAN IQA Double Accreditation)
- PMI (International) Accreditation since 2021 (The first business school in Saint-Petersburg to become a PMI Authorized Training Partner)
