= Fundação Dom Cabral =

Coordinates: 20.1632°S 43.9544°W

- Nova Lima, Minas Gerais, Brazil

Information
- School type: Private - nonprofit institution
- Established: 1976
- Dean: Antonio Batista da Silva Junior
- Accreditations: AMBA, EQUIS
- Website: https://www.fdc.org.br/

Fundação Dom Cabral - Campus Aloysio Farias, Nova Lima, Minas Gerais, Brazil

Established in 1976, Fundação Dom Cabral (FDC) is a Brazilian business school. FDC, a nonprofit institution, was created out of the Extension Center at the Pontifical Catholic University of Minas Gerais. Approximately 40,000 executives from midsize to large companies attend FDC programs every year – in the cities of Nova Lima, Belo Horizonte, São Paulo, and Rio de Janeiro.

FDC has strategic alliances with foreign teaching institutions such as INSEAD and Skema Business School in France and the Kellogg School of Management at Northwestern University in the U.S. FDC also has cooperative partnerships with schools in Brazil, Argentina, Colombia, Chile, China, India, Mexico, Peru, Portugal, Russia, Spain, and the United Kingdom.

== Timeline ==
1976 - Fundação Dom Cabral was founded.
1989 – Creation of the first partnership program: CTE – Executive Technology Center
1990 – Alliance with INSEAD (France) to develop open enrollment programs for senior executives working in Brazil
1992 – Creation of PAEX – Partners for Excellence, a partnership program for middle-sized companies
1993 – Alliance with Kellogg School of Management - Northwestern University (USA) to develop an open enrollment program for leaders of companies operating in Brazil
1996 – Launching of the MBA Empresarial an executive MBA program in consortium
1999 – Creation of PDA – a partnership for the development of family business shareholders
2001 – Inauguration of the FDC Aloysio Farias Campus located in the city of Nova Lima, 30 km south of Belo Horizonte
2002 – Alliance with Sauder School of Business (Canada) to develop programs for high potential managers and programs on specific subjects including a program in China
2004 – Fundação Dom Cabral joined the UN Global Compact, pledging to insert its principles into the institution’s decisions and to collaborate in spreading business practices expressing the values of sustainable development.
2005 - Accreditation of the MBA programs by AMBA (Association of MBAs).
2007 - Received the EQUIS (EFMD) accreditation.
2012 - Signed a partnership with Hult International Business School to become the host of their global campus rotation program.

2015 - Signed a partnership with Skema Business School to become the host of Skema's Grande École program
