= Trinity Business School, Trinity College Dublin =

Academic unit

Coordinates: 53.3449188°N 6.255017653°W

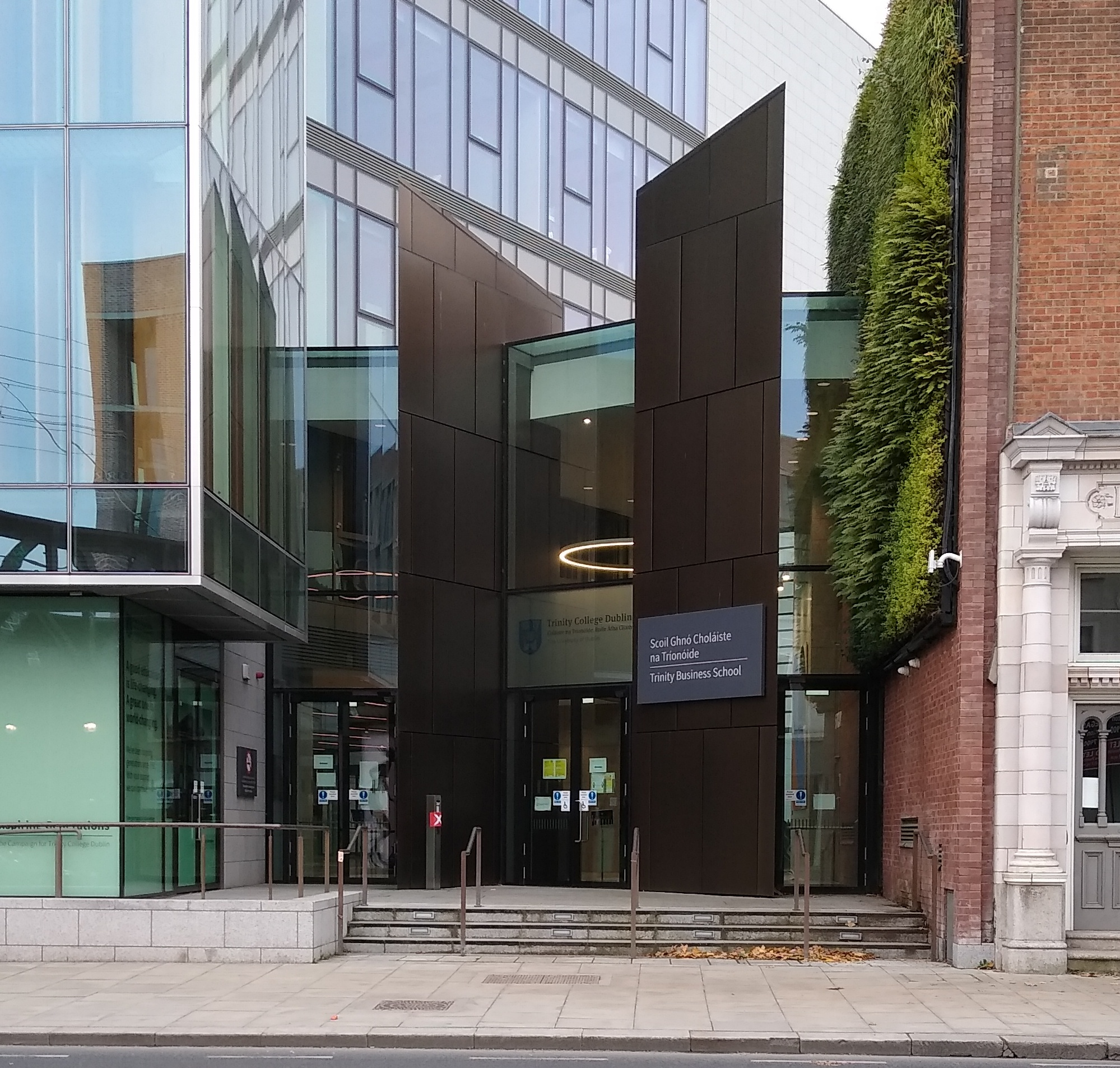
- Type: Business School
- Established: 1925
- Affiliations: AACSB, AMBA, EQUIS, Athena SWAN, Coimbra Group
- Dean: Laurent Muzellec
- Students: 2,150
- Location: Dublin City, Ireland
- Website: http://www.tcd.ie/business/

Trinity Business School (TBS) is one of the 24 academic schools of Trinity College Dublin in Ireland. Located on Pearse Street, the business school is triple accredited (AACSB/EQUIS/AMBA), a distinction held by under 1% of business schools worldwide. It offers programmes at undergraduate, postgraduate, MBA and Executive Education levels. Trinity College Dublin is ranked 75 in the World by the QS World University Ranking 2026.. The Eduniversal Best Masters ranking rates consistently all Trinity Business School graduate programmes among the 50 best worldwide.

Since 2023 the new Dean of Business School is Professor Laurent Muzellec.

== Programme Rankings ==
Trinity Business School is ranked No. 1 in Ireland in the QS Rankings 2026 across the following programmes:

- Full-time MBA (Global MBA Rankings 2026)
- Executive MBA (EMBA Ranking 2026)
- Flexible Executive MBA (Online MBA Ranking 2026)
- MSc in Business Analytics (Masters in Business Analytics Ranking 2026)
- MSc in Finance (Masters in Finance Ranking 2026)
- Msc in Marketing (Masters in Marketing Ranking 2026)
- MSc in Operations & Supply Chain Management (Masters in Supply Chain Management Ranking 2026)

Trinity Business School is ranked No. 1 in Ireland in the Financial Times Rankings 2026 across the following programmes:

- Executive Education Custom Programmes (Executive Education - Custom Ranking 2026)

== History ==
Established as a School of Commerce in 1925, the School has grown from offering B.A. and BComm degrees to offering an MBA programme since 1964 when it was transformed into a School of Business Studies. A full suite of Masters programmes exist today and this began in 1976 when the MSc (Mgmt) degree in Management Practice for practicing senior executives was launched, with a curriculum based on action research principles. The School is part of the Faculty of Arts, Humanities and Social Sciences of Trinity College.

The new €80 million 11,400 square metre Trinity Business School building was opened in 2019 and includes an innovation and entrepreneurial hub, a 600-seat auditorium, restaurant spaces for up to 200 people, smart classrooms and a rooftop conference room. It is a near zero energy building, with some 500sq m of photovoltaic panels installed on the roof contribute to the electrical provision of the building and offsetting 35 tonnes of carbon per annum. Water for toilets is provided by recycled rainwater.

== Programmes ==
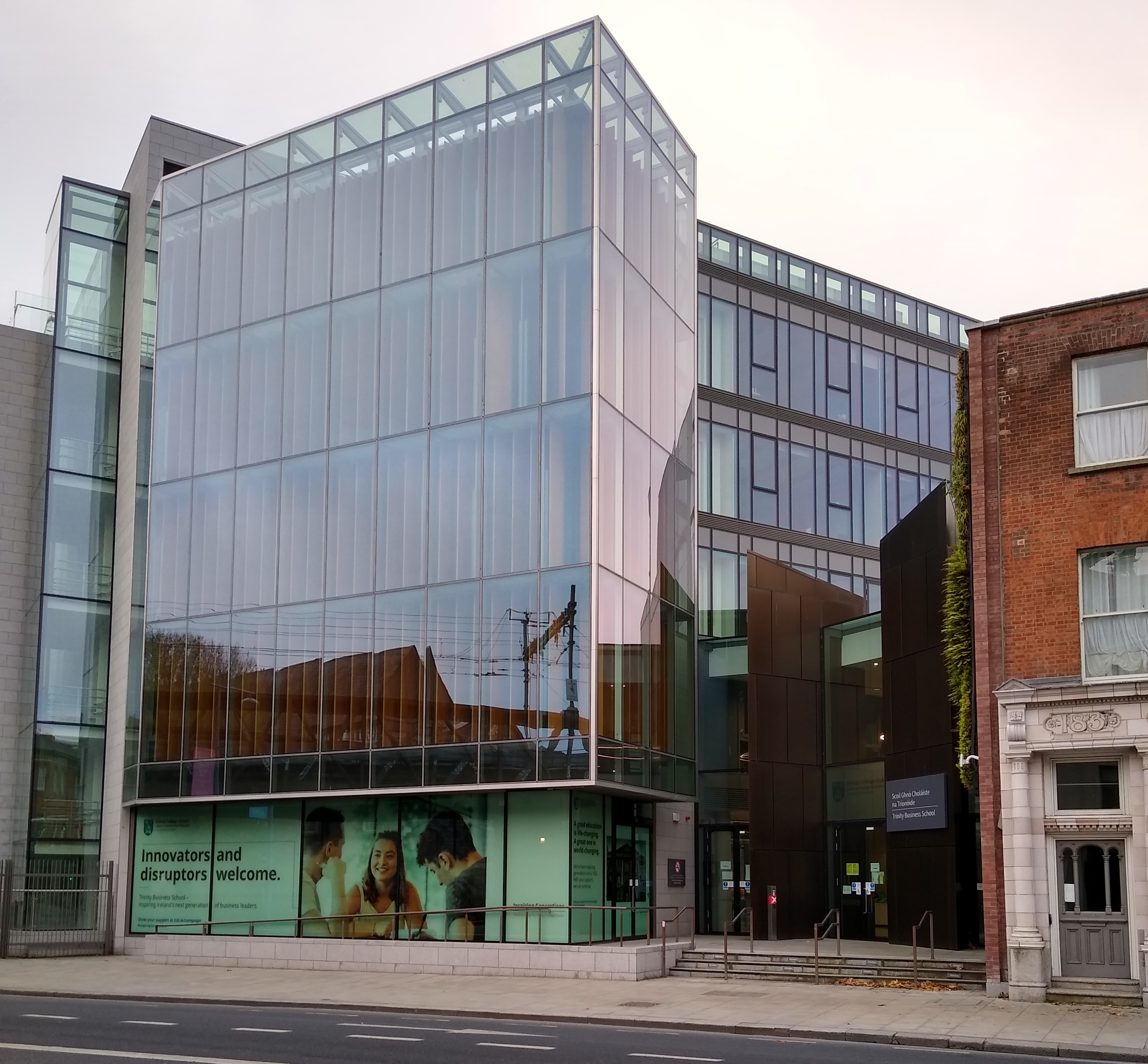
Trinity Business School

Trinity Business School offers programmes at undergraduate, postgraduate and MBA levels.

Undergraduate

- Bachelor in Business Studies (B.B.S.)
- BA Moderatorship Business, Economic and Social Studies (B.E.S.S.)
- Business and Law
- Business and Languages
- Business and Computing
- Global Business

Postgraduate

- MSc in Operations and Supply Chain Management
- MSc in Digital Marketing Strategy
- MSc in Business Analytics and AI for Management (Part-time/Full-Time)
- MSc in Law & Finance
- MSc in Entrepreneurship and Innovation
- MSc in Finance
- MSc in Financial Risk Management
- MSc in Human Resource Management
- MSc in International Management
- MSc in Management
- MSc in Marketing
- MSc in Accounting and Analytics
- Trinity MBA (Flexible (Online), Executive & Full-Time)
- Executive Education

Doctoral Programme

== Research ==
Researchers in Trinity Business School seek answers to managerially relevant questions that are focused on the following themes:

- Entrepreneurship and Social Entrepreneurship
- Marketing and Consumers
- Finance and Accounting
- Work and People
- Strategy and Change
- CSR, Governance and Business Ethics
- International Business
- Innovation, Manufacturing and Systems
- Organizational Studies

== Affiliated societies and alumni groups ==
- Trinity Business Alumni - The global association of graduates of Trinity College Dublin who are involved in business.
- DUBES - The Dublin University Business and Economics Society (DUBES), founded in 1929.
- Trinity Entrepreneurial Society
- Enactus - A social entrepreneurship society.
- Trinity Economic Forum
- Trinity SMF - Trinity SMF is the Student Managed Fund.
- Trinity Business Review - A leading student business publication

== Scholarships and Awards ==
- Trinity MBA Scholarship Fund
- Trinity MBA 30% Club Scholarship for Women in Leadership
- The Séamus McDermott Entrepreneurship Scholarship
- Social Impact Scholarships
- The Tom Cunningham Trust and Trinity Business School MBA Scholarship
- Trinity MBA Alumni Bursaries
- Trinity Business EY Business Student of the Year Award

== Notable alumni ==
- Hoang Trung Hai, Deputy Prime Minister, Socialist Republic of Vietnam
- Michael O'Leary, CEO Ryanair
- Hugo MacNeill MD Goldman Sachs, former Irish international rugby player
- Willie Walsh, CEO International Airlines Group
