= Mediterranean Institute of Technology =

South Mediterranean University unit in Tunisia

- Type: Private
- Established: 2014; 12 years ago
- Dean: Hichem Kallel
- Location: Tunis, Tunisia; 36.845798°N 10.269064°E
- Campus: Berges du Lac (Tunis)
- Language: English
- Research Groups: 5
- Website: www.medtech.tn

Founded in 2014, the Mediterranean Institute of Technology (MedTech) is part of the South Mediterranean University which focuses on engineering and technology. It is and English-speaking university in Tunisia. MedTech provides courses in different areas such as Software Engineering, Computer Systems Engineering, Renewable Energies, Artificial Intelligence, and Blockchain applications.

MedTech mission is to contribute to the country’s technology sector by giving members access to practical resources, including Laboratories, a startup incubator, and an international network of experts.

MedTech’s teaching approach is based on providing students with direct, hands-on learning. Each student is encouraged to explore personal interests and projects through courses, training, clubs, and collaborative work.

== Accreditation ==
- National Accreditation by the Ministry of Higher Education and Scientific Research
- ABET

== ABET Accredited Programs ==
- Computer Systems Engineering (Degree of Engineering)
- Renewable Energy Engineering (Degree of Engineering)
- Software Engineering (Degree of Engineering)

== Research Groups ==
- SIM LAB: Software Improvement Laboratory
- SERG: Sustainable Energy Research Group
- I-ACT: Innovation on Advanced Computer Technologies
- IIE: Innovation in Education
- AI: Artificial Intelligence

== See also ==
- List of universities in Tunisia
- List of schools in Tunisia
- Education in Tunisia
