= Queen's Business School =

Business school of Queen's University Belfast

Queen’s Business School
- Former name: Queen’s Management School
- Type: Business school
- Established: 1999: School of Management and Economics; 2007: Queen's University Management School; 2015: Queen's Management School; 2023: Queen’s Business School
- Parent institution: Queen’s University Belfast
- Accreditation: AACSB, AMBA, EQUIS
- Dean: M. N. Ravishankar
- Academic staff: 132
- Students: 2,730 (2024/25)
- Location: Belfast, Northern Ireland; 54.57635°N 5.93521°W
- Campus: Riddel Hall, Stranmillis Road, South Belfast
- Nickname: QBS
- Website: qub.ac.uk/schools/queens-business-school

Queen’s Business School (QBS) is the business school of Queen’s University Belfast, Northern Ireland. It delivers undergraduate, postgraduate, and executive education in business, management, economics, accounting, finance, and related fields. The school is notable for its triple crown business school accreditation and its long tradition of economics and business scholarship.

== History ==
The roots of business and economics teaching and research at Queen’s date back to the mid-nineteenth century. Thomas Edward Cliffe Leslie, Professor of Jurisprudence and Political Economy at Queen’s College, Belfast from 1853, is regarded as one of the founders of the English historical school of political economy. His successors included Hugh Owen Meredith, author in 1908 of the first economic history textbook in the English language, and the civil servant and educationalist Thomas Jones, who was briefly Professor of Economics in 1909–10.

Notable faculty in the 1960s include R. D. C. Black, whose work bridged economic history and the history of economic thought, and Denis Patrick O'Brien, who contributed significantly to industrial economics and the history of economic thought.

More recent notable former Queen's University Belfast academics associated with the disciplines now taught at the school include Harvard School of Public Health professor David Canning, known for his research on the effect of ageing demographic structures on economic activity, and Ulster University regional economist Esmond Birnie, a former unionist politician.

== Autonomy and rebranding ==
The school was originally formed in 1999 through the merger of the university’s separate departments of accounting, economics, finance and management. Since then, the school has operated under several names: first as the School of Management and Economics, then as Queen’s University Management School, and later as Queen’s Management School.

In September 2023, it rebranded again, this time as Queen’s Business School, chosen to reflect its expanded international profile and strategic ambitions. The rebranding coincided with the opening of the QBS Student Hub, a new building on the Riddel Hall campus designed to enhance teaching, learning, and collaboration spaces for students and staff.

Queen’s Business School was formerly part of the university's Faculty of Arts, Humanities and Social Sciences and was led by a Head of School. In August 2025, following the achievement of triple accreditation, Queen’s Business School was placed outside the university's faculty structure. It is now led by a Dean, reflecting its greater autonomy and strategic independence.

== Academic structure ==
QBS comprises six academic departments and one executive education department:

- Accounting
- Economics
- Finance
- International Business, Entrepreneurship & Marketing (IBEM)
- Information Technology, Analytics & Operations (ITAO)
- Organisation, Work & Leadership (OWL)
- William J. Clinton Leadership Institute (CLI)

== Accreditation and recognition ==
Queen’s Business School holds the “triple crown” of international business school accreditations:

- AACSB (Association to Advance Collegiate Schools of Business)
- AMBA (Association of MBAs)
- EQUIS (EFMD Quality Improvement System)

This places QBS among the top one per cent of business schools worldwide.

The school also holds the Small Business Charter, an Athena Swan bronze award for gender equality, and has been a PRME Champion institution since 2020.

In 2025, it was ranked third in the United Kingdom for Graduate Prospects in Accounting & Finance by the Times Good University Guide 2026.

== Campus and facilities ==
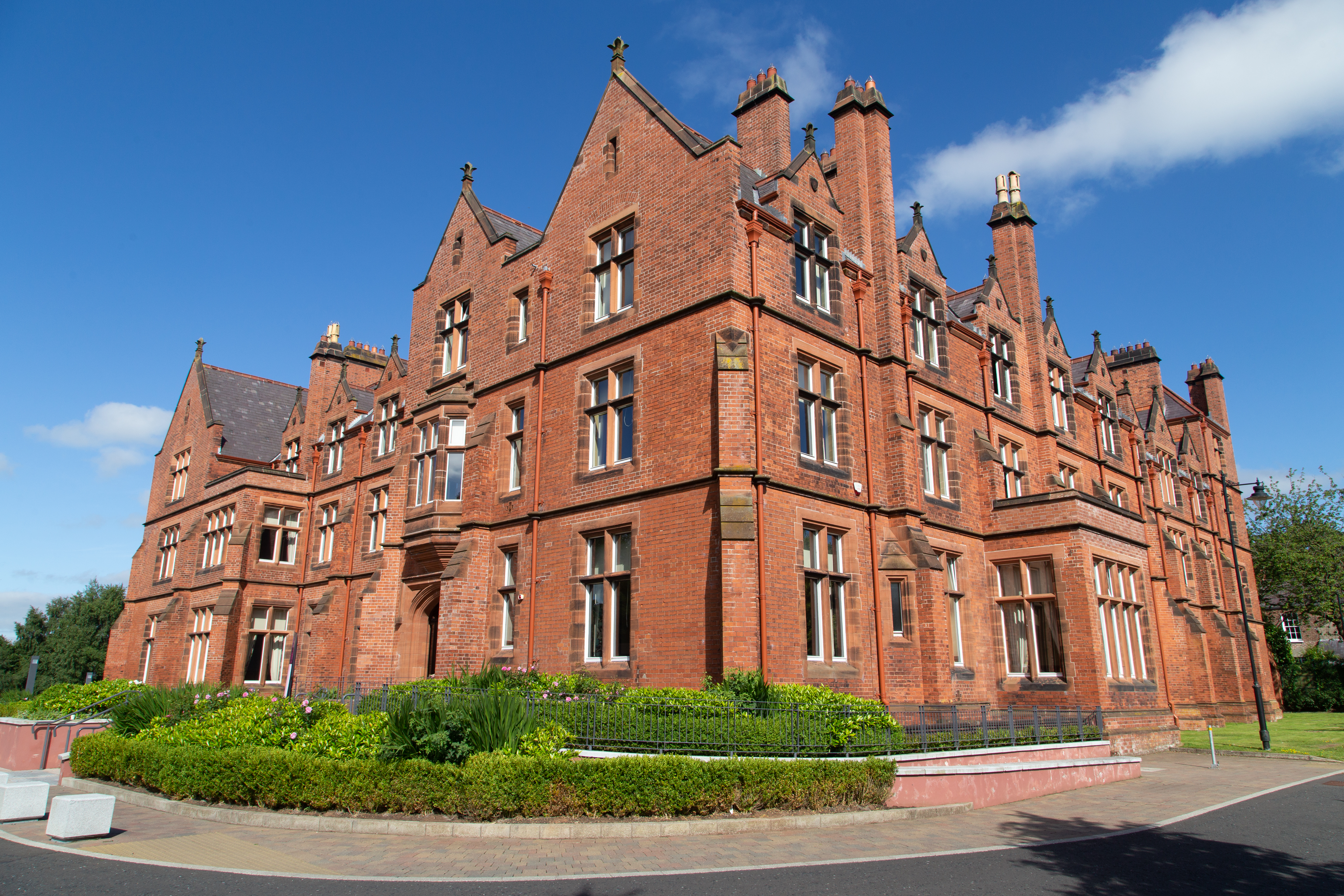
Riddel Hall

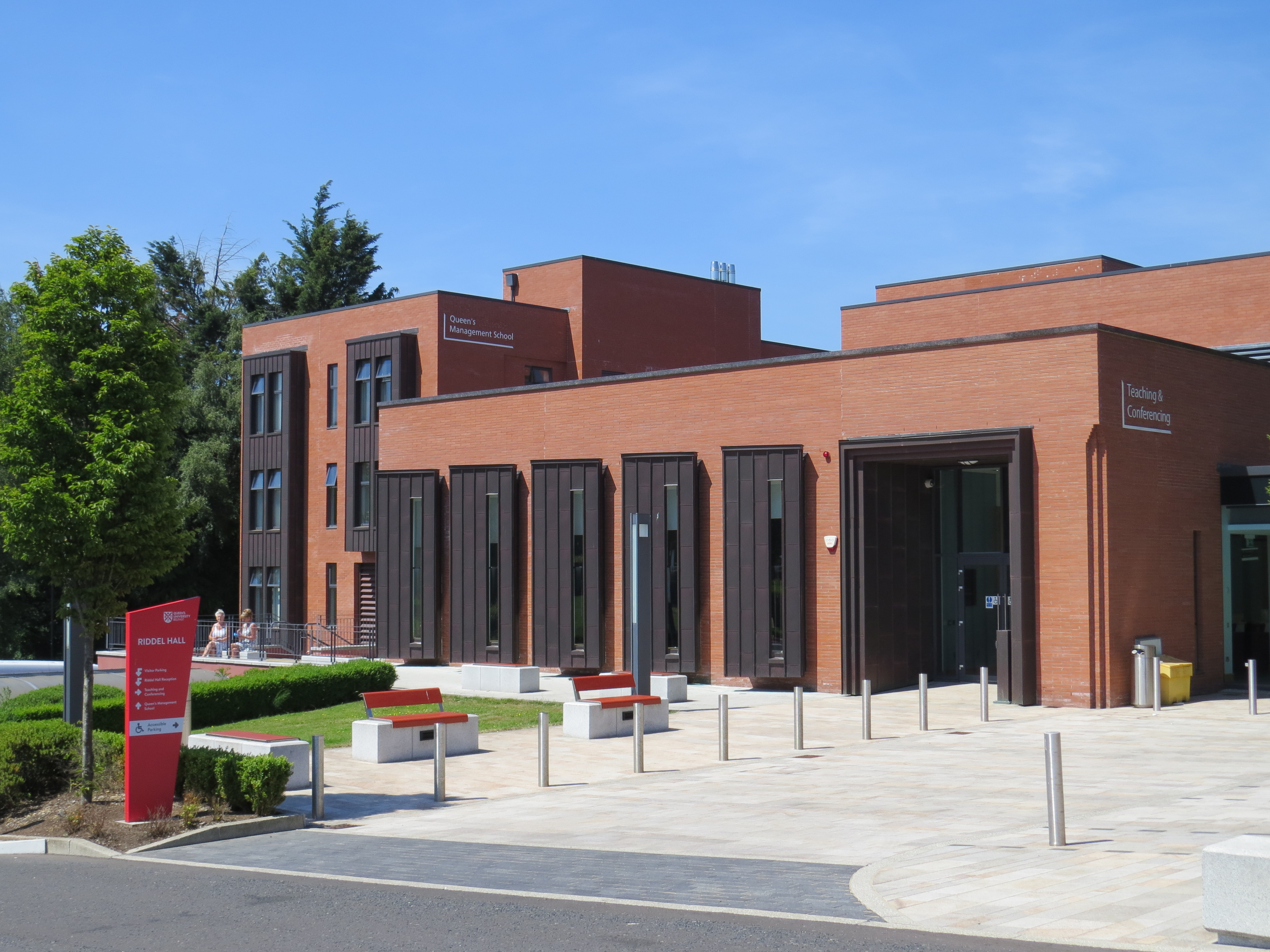
QBS Academic and Conference Hubs

Queen's Business School is located at Riddel Hall, 185 Stranmillis Road, Belfast, within the Stranmillis Conservation Area, south of Queen’s main campus. Riddel Hall, a Grade II-listed red-brick building, was originally endowed in 1913 by Eliza and Isabella Riddel as a women’s halls of residence for Queen's students.

A £14 million redevelopment in 2011 added two new buildings to the Riddel Hall site, expanding teaching and office space (QBS Conference Hub and QBS Academic Hub). Since 2012, it has housed the business school alongside the university’s banqueting and conferencing facilities.

The QBS Student Hub, opened in 2023, is a 6,797m² extension to Riddel Hall campus providing teaching, study, and social spaces for students and staff. Constructed on a previously unused section of the Riddel Hall grounds, the £26 million building includes two large lecture theatres, seminar and computer rooms, postgraduate research and breakout areas, an executive teaching suite, a financial trading room, and a café. The building incorporates sustainability features such as geothermal heating, solar energy systems, and bicycle and electric-vehicle facilities, and was designed to complement the heritage setting of Riddel Hall. The new building has won several architectural awards, including a RIBA National Award and becoming the Royal Society of Ulster Architects Building of the Year in 2025.

== Education programmes ==
=== Undergraduate ===
As of 2025–26, Queen’s Business School offers the following undergraduate programmes:

- MAcc Advanced Accounting with Placement.
- BSc Actuarial Science and Risk Management.
- BSc Business Economics.
- BSc Business Management with Placement.
- BSc Economics.
- BSc Economics and Accounting.
- BSc Economics (Major) with Finance.
- BSc Finance (with a Year in Industry).
- BSc Financial Risk Management (with a Year in Industry).
- BSc International Business with a Language (French, German, Mandarin, Portuguese or Spanish).

It also contributes towards the provision of several cross-university programmes:

- BSc Business Information Technology incl. Professional Experience (delivered with the School of Electronics, Electrical Engineering and Computer Science).
- MLib Liberal Arts (delivered with the School of Arts, English and Languages).
- BA Politics, Philosophy and Economics (delivered with the School of History, Anthropology, Philosophy and Politics).

=== Postgraduate taught ===
The school offers MSc programmes in Business Analytics, Finance and Trading, Human Resource Management, Digital Business, Technology Management, and Accounting, Finance and Analytics, as well as the Queen’s MBA.

=== Postgraduate research ===
Queen's Business School academics supervise PhD students in economics, finance, accounting, and management. The school offers a range of funded studentships. Postgraduate research students may be eligible for funding through the ESRC Northern Ireland and North East Doctoral Training Partnership (NINE DTP).

== Research and engagement ==
The school promotes research aimed at transforming business and society, collaborating with industry, government, and civil society partners. Its research interprets patterns of economic, business, and social life to generate new theoretical insights and inform public policy and business practice, focusing on themes such as markets, organisations, sustainability, and technology. The school has a particular research strength in the field of economic history.

In the UK Research Excellence Framework (2021), 81% of the school’s research was rated “world-leading” or “internationally excellent.”

The School operates placements, mentoring schemes, and a business clinic, connecting students, academics, and employers.

== Affiliated institutes and centres ==
The William J. Clinton Leadership Institute, established in 2011 at Riddel Hall, delivers executive education and leadership development for private, public, and third-sector organisations, including the UK Government’s Help to Grow: Management programme.

The school supports interdisciplinary research through the Queen’s University Centre for Economic History (QUCEH), founded in 2012, which promotes historical approaches to business and economic analysis. QUCEH serves as the Northern Ireland node of the Centre for Economics, Policy and History (CEPH), a collaboration with the Department of Economics at Trinity College Dublin. It is also linked to the Long Run Institute, a not-for-profit forum that promotes long-term economic thinking.

== See also ==
- Queen’s University Belfast
- Eliza and Isabella Riddel
- Triple accreditation
- List of business schools in Europe
