= Nottingham Business School =

Business school in Nottingham, England

- Type: Public business school
- Established: 1979
- Parent institution: Nottingham Trent University
- Accreditation: AACSB, EQUIS, AMBA
- Dean: Baback Yazdani
- Academic staff: 350
- Students: 8,500
- Location: Nottingham, England, United Kingdom; 51°31′35″N 0°09′39″W
- Campus: City Campus
- Website: www.ntu.ac.uk/nbs

Nottingham Business School (NBS) is a triple crown–accredited business school based in Nottingham, England, and part of Nottingham Trent University. The school holds international accreditation from EQUIS, AACSB and the AMBA, a distinction achieved by fewer than 1% of business schools worldwide. NBS offers undergraduate, postgraduate, executive and doctoral programmes in business, management, economics and related fields.

The school is recognised as a PRME Champion by the Principles for Responsible Management Education (PRME), a United Nations–supported initiative promoting responsible management education.

== History ==
NBS was formally established in 1979. In 2010, the school opened the regenerated Newton and Arkwright project: two of the University’s flagship Grade II listed buildings were transformed into a modern complex, linked together by a glazed link building.

== Mission and profile ==
NBS’s stated purpose is to deliver research and education that combines academic excellence with a positive impact on people, business and society. The school emphasises experiential learning, personalisation of the student experience and strong engagement with business, public and voluntary sectors.

The School states that international engagement with organisations and professional bodies forms a key part of its approach to research and education. According to Nottingham Business School, collaboration with businesses and other institutions helps ensure that its teaching and research remain relevant to business practice, policy development and wider societal challenges.

== Organisation and departments ==
The School is led by an Executive Dean (currently Professor Baback Yazdani) and supported by senior leadership. Academic activity is organised through departments including:

- Accounting & Finance
- Economics
- People, Work and Organisations
- Management
- Marketing
- Strategy, Analytics & Operations

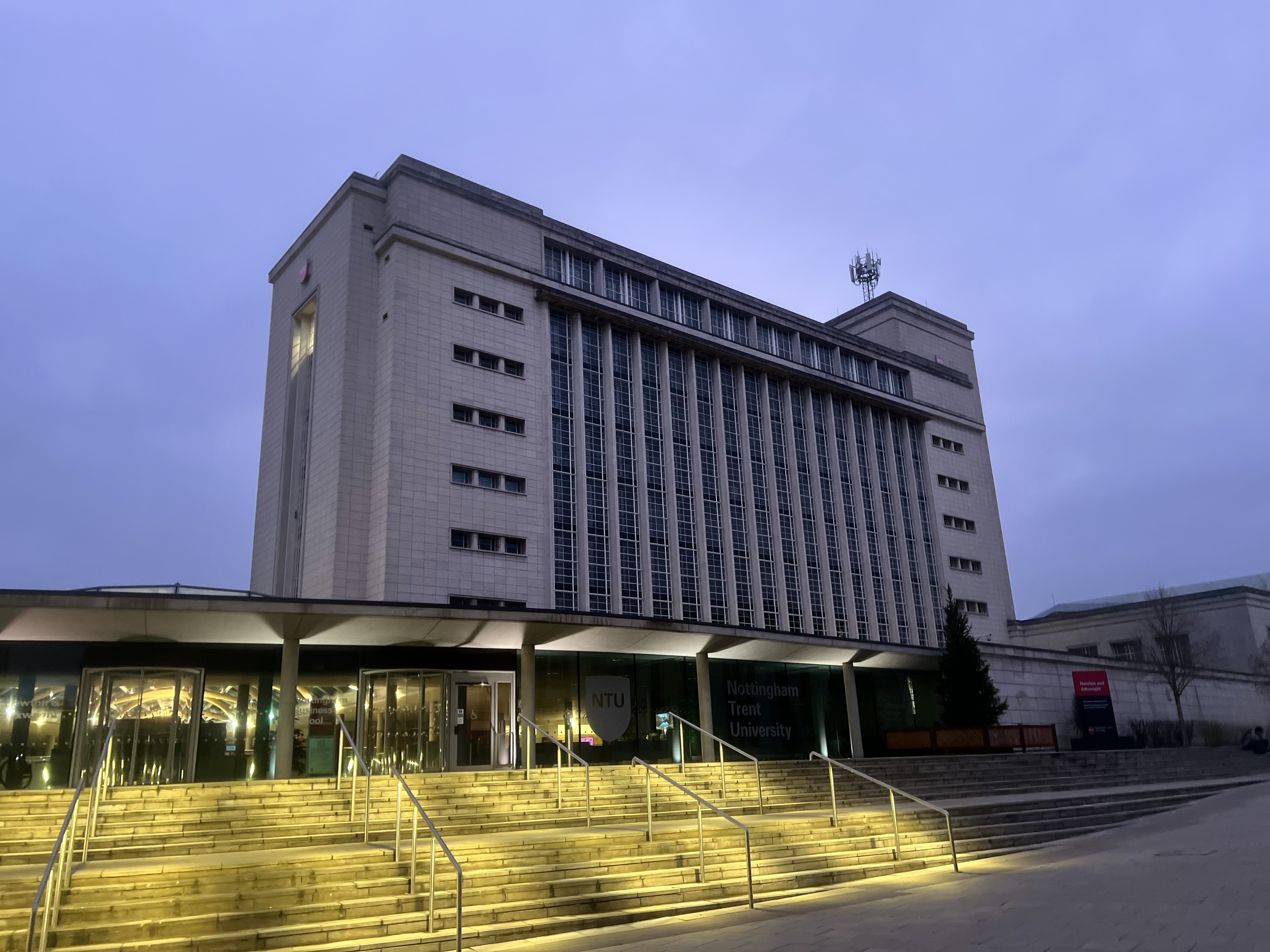
Nottingham Business School, Nottingham Trent University (Newton Building)

== Programmes ==
NBS offers a wide portfolio of programmes:

- Undergraduate degrees (including BA/ BSc in business, accounting, economics, marketing and related subjects) with opportunities for placements and international study abroad.
- Postgraduate taught Master’s programmes and a range of MBA/Executive MBA offerings.
- Doctoral (PhD) research programmes.
- Professional, apprenticeship and executive education programmes.

== Accreditation and rankings ==
NBS has achieved the “triple crown” of international business school accreditation: EQUIS, AACSB, and AMBA - a distinction held by less than 1% of business schools. The School is also recognised as a Principles for Responsible Management Education (PRME) Champion and accredited under the UK’s Small Business Charter for business engagement. In its curriculum and research it emphasises sustainability, ethics and responsible management.

Business school rankings

Europe MBA Rankings
- QS (2026): 92

Nottingham Business School has appeared in several international business school rankings. In the 2027 QS Global MBA and Business Master's Rankings, the School's MBA was ranked among the top 100 in Europe, its MSc Marketing among the top 80 in Europe, and its MSc Finance and MSc Management programmes among the top 100 in Europe.

The School has also appeared in several international rankings published by the Financial Times. In the 2024 Financial Times Executive Education Open ranking, the School's open-enrolment executive education programmes were ranked 79th globally. The School's MSc Management programme was previously ranked 97th in the Financial Times Masters in Management ranking in 2019. Nottingham Business School was also ranked 94th in Europe in the Financial Times European Business School Rankings in 2019.

== Campus and facilities ==
Nottingham Business School is located at the City Campus of Nottingham Trent University in central Nottingham. The School is primarily based in the Newton Building, a Grade II* listed building that forms the centre of the university's City Campus.

The Newton Building underwent a major redevelopment completed in 2009 as part of a £90 million regeneration project involving both the Newton and neighbouring Arkwright buildings. The refurbishment modernised the historic structures and created new teaching spaces, lecture theatres, study areas and social spaces organised around a central forum designed to support collaborative learning.

The building includes computer laboratories, lecture theatres and specialist teaching facilities used by business students. Nottingham Business School also operates a trading room equipped with Bloomberg terminals, allowing students to access live financial market data for teaching and research purposes.

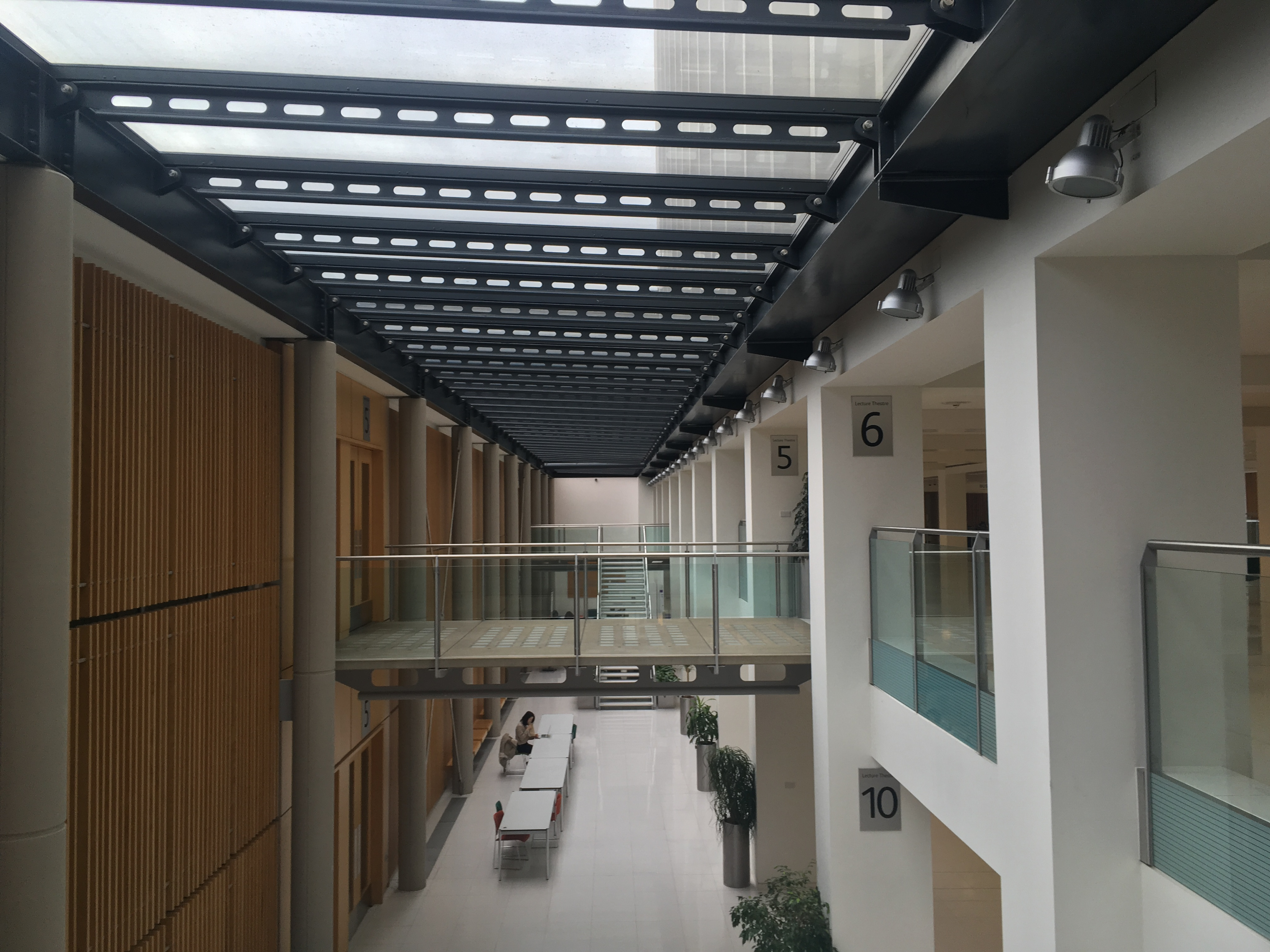
Inside the Newton Building

In March 2024, Nottingham Business School opened the Belgrave Postgraduate Centre, a refurbished facility located in the Belgrave building at the City Campus. The 4,700 square metre centre provides teaching spaces, study areas, meeting rooms and a lecture theatre for postgraduate, doctoral and executive education students.

== Industry engagement and impact ==
The School highlights its strong links with business, public and voluntary organisations, embedding applied consultancy projects, placements, and executive education into its portfolio.

== See also ==
- Nottingham Trent University
- List of business schools in the United Kingdom
