= IAE Universidad Austral =

IAE Business school
- Type: Private
- Established: 1978
- Accreditation: Triple accreditation
- Dean: Rodolfo Q. Rivarola
- Location: Pilar, Buenos Aires Province, Argentina
- Website: http://www.iae.edu.ar

IAE Business School is the Management and Business School of the Argentine Austral University. It is located in the suburb of Pilar in Buenos Aires Province, Argentina.

The IAE Business School has one of the biggest alumni communities in Latin America with over 15.000 graduates distributed in more than 25 countries.

In the 2010 QS Global 200 Business Schools Report, IAE Business School was placed as the 6th best business school in Latin America. In the 2011 Financial Times executive education ranking, the school ranked 26th worldwide, third in Latin America.

== Graduate programs ==
- MBA, full-time, one year.
- IAE offers two EMBA program formats: the two-year Executive MBA and the Regional EMBA. The latter is designed for those who reside elsewhere or cannot attend regular weekly classes.
- Ph.D. in Business Management.

== Executive programs ==
Since 1978, enrollment in IAE's executive training programs has exceeded 1,700.

- General Management Programs
- Focused Programs
- Customized Programs
- Specialty Programs
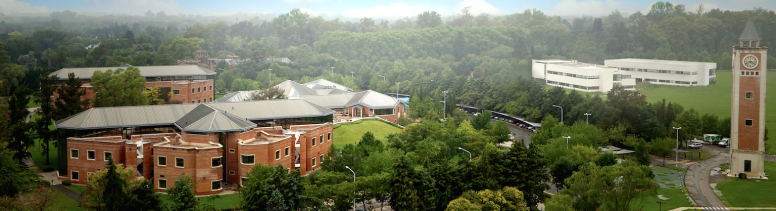
  Austral University's main campus: Pilar Campus. It is formed by IAE Business School, Austral University's Hospital, Business and Technological Austral Park and all the other faculties, schools and institutes of the University: Law, Communication, Business Sciences, Biomedical Sciences, Government, Philosophy, Education, Engineering and Family Sciences.

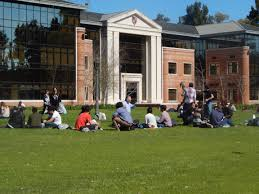
Open class at IAE's Campus.

== Accreditation ==
IAE is the only Argentine business school with Triple accreditation:

- AACSB - The Association to Advance Collegiate Schools of Business
- AMBA - Association of MBAs
- EQUIS - European Quality Improvement System

== Partner schools ==
IAE Business School offers international executive programs jointly with the IESE Business School and Harvard Business School.

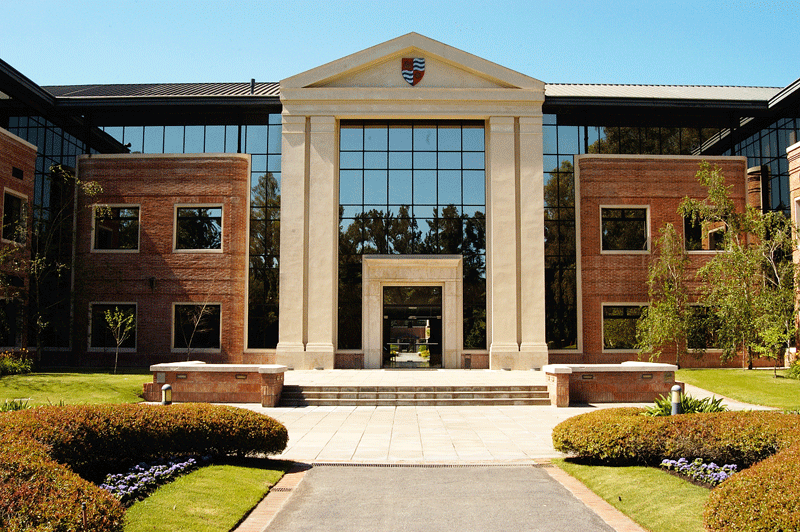
IAE's main building entrance.

== Facilities ==
IAE's campus stands on 20 of the 237 acres (96 ha) in the Universidad Austral Campus. It is located a few yards from the 8 National Highway. The four buildings have a total area of 26.9107 square yards (22.5008 m^{2}).

The Campus includes the University Hospital, inaugurated in March 2000. It also houses the nine other faculties, institutes and schools of the University.
