= University of Exeter Business School =

Business school in Exeter, UK

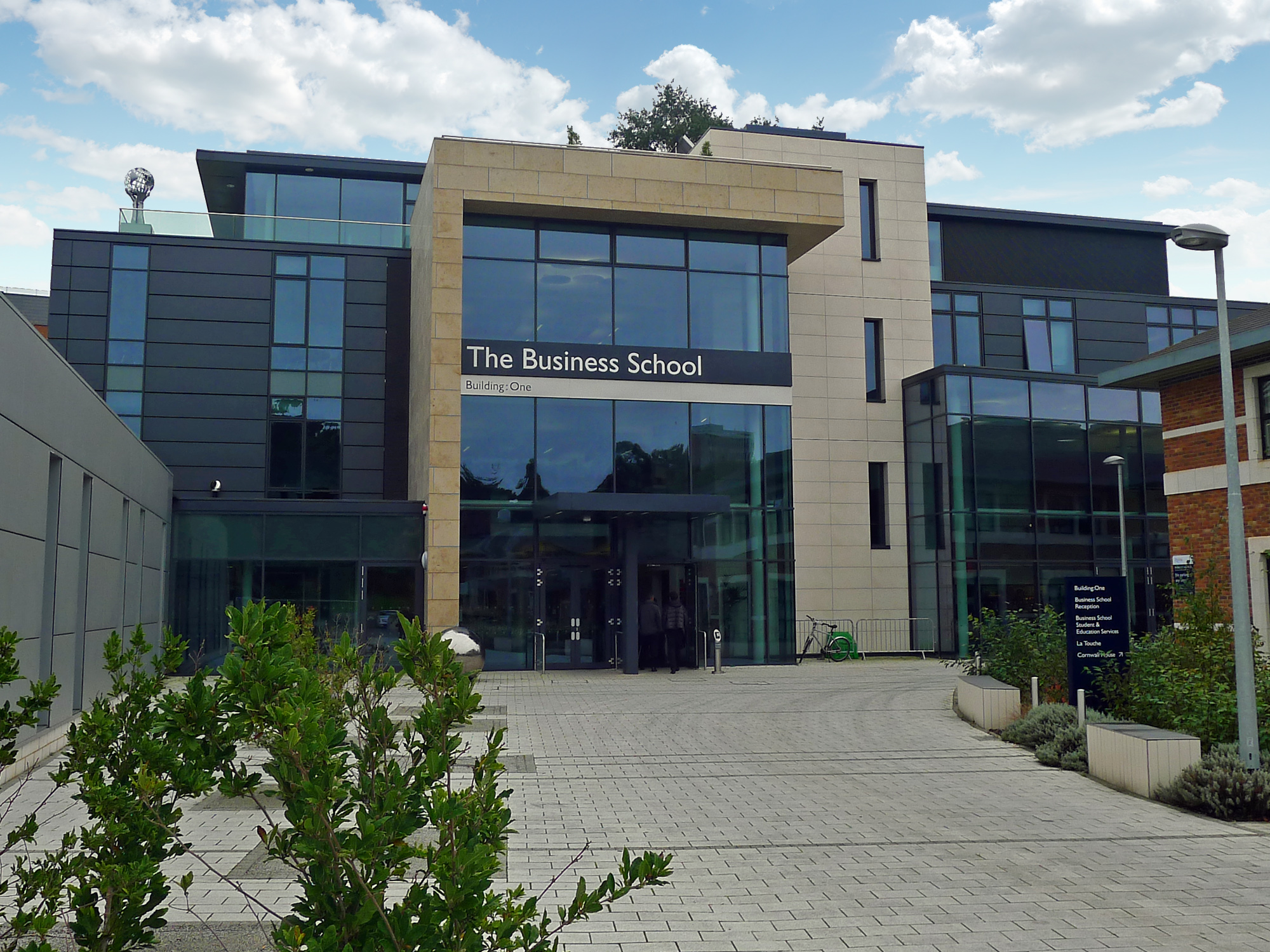
- Building:One located on Streatham Campus
- Type: Business School
- Established: 1988: Centre for Management 2008: University of Exeter Business School
- Affiliations: AACSB; AMBA; EQUIS
- Dean: Professor Steve Wood
- Faculty: 200+
- Location: Exeter, United Kingdom; 50.7357°N 3.530°W
- Campus: Urban
Colours
Green and white
- Website: business-school.exeter.ac.uk

The University of Exeter Business School is the business school of the University of Exeter in England. Founded in 2008, it is located on the university's Streatham Campus within the city of Exeter. The school possess the Triple Crown Accreditation from AACSB, AMBA and EQUIS.

The School offers undergraduate BSc and postgraduate degrees in business, economics, marketing, finance, accounting and management programmes. The school offers the Exeter MBA which focuses on sustainability, a dedicated Master in Management programme and specialised MSc degrees, as well as MRes and PhD research programmes.

== History ==
The university offered its first MBA in 1988 with the formation of the Centre for Management Studies. In 1998 the University of Exeter Business School was launched with the Departments of Management, Economics, Accounting and Finance merged. At the time of its formation, the Business School employed 38 full-time academics, by 2013 this number had risen to over 200.

== Reputation ==
The University of Exeter Business School is a UK-based international Business School which is part of a Russell Group university ranked within the Global Top 100 according to The Times Higher Education World Rankings 2015. It held 7th-place position during both 2015 and 2016 respectively according to The Times and The Sunday Times University Guide 2016.

The business school maintains international partnerships with other leading business schools in Europe and globally.
