= Berges du Lac =

Affluent neighborhood in Tunis, Tunisia

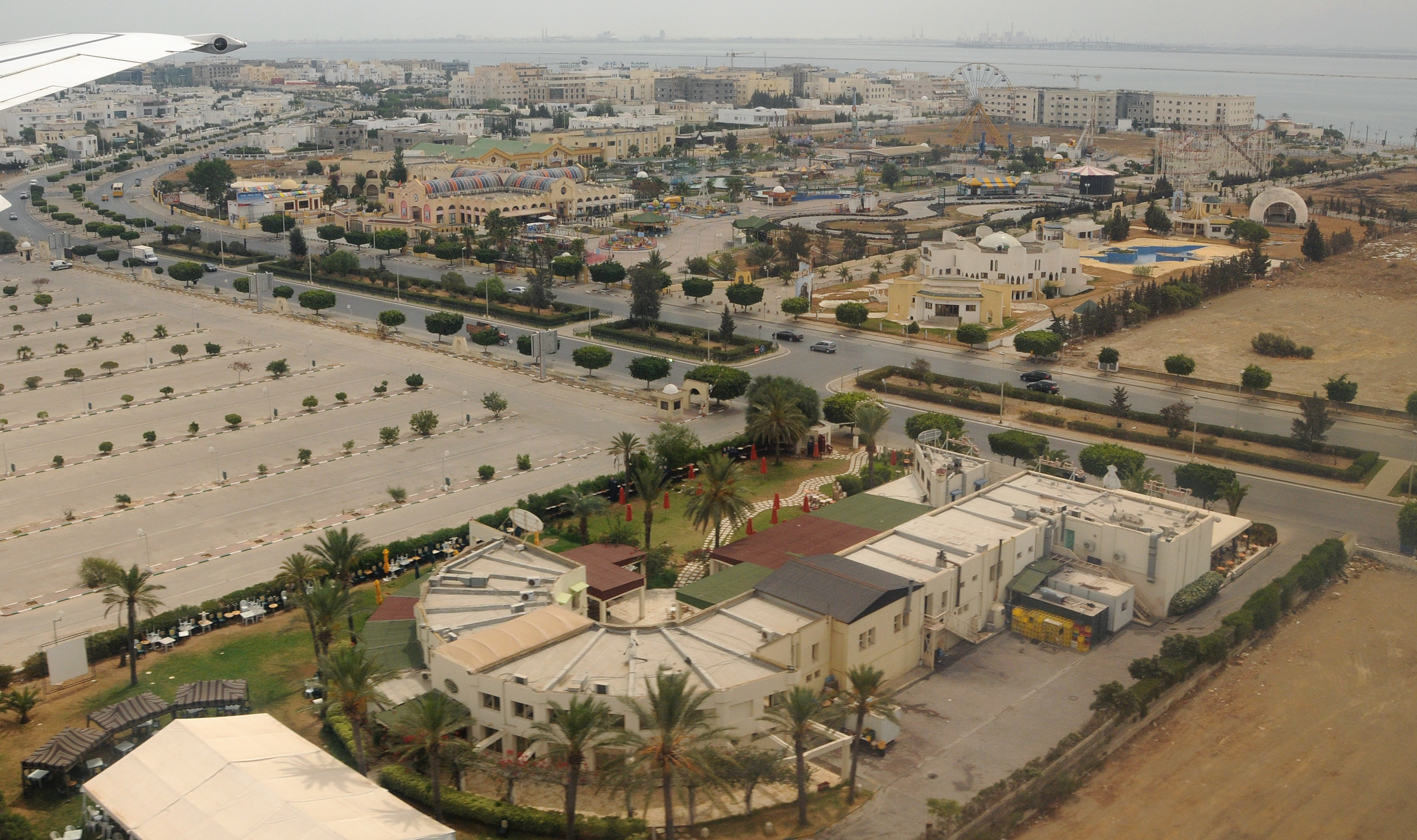
Aerial view of Berges du Lac

Les Berges du Lac (Arabic: ضفاف البحيرة) is an affluent neighborhood in Tunis, Tunisia. It has developed since the 1980s after building polders in Tunis Lake. It harbors many embassies, companies, and institutions, including:

- EU Embassy
- Indonesia Embassy
- Iraq Embassy
- Lebanon Embassy
- Malaysia Embassy
- Norway Embassy
- Palestine Embassy
- Sweden Embassy
- UK Embassy
- US Embassy
- Citroën Tunisia
- Dahdah Park
- Fiat Tunisia
- Groupe Tunisie Télécom
- GTZ Tunisia
- HP Tunisia
- Mediterranean School of Business
- Microsoft Tunisia
- Orange Tunisia
- Siemens Tunisia
- Total Tunisia
- Ooredoo
- LG Electronics Tunisia
- SAMSUNG Tunisia
- Tunis Sports City
- Vermeg
- Embassy of Germany
- Embassy of Canada
- ICMPD
- Union Internationale de Banques (General Directorate)

The Berges du Lac development does not currently serve alcohol. This was a condition imposed by investors from Saudi Arabia.
