= Tunis Sports City =

Sports venue in Tunis, Tunisia

Coordinates: 36°50′54″N 10°17′16″E

The Tunis Sports City is an entire sports city currently being constructed in Tunis, Tunisia. The general master plan was designed by the Italian architect Enzo Calabrese and his architecture firm Kei_En. Enzo Calabrese Design Studio SRL. The city that will consist of apartment buildings as well as several sports facilities will be built by the Bukhatir Group at a cost of $5 billion (5.86 billion Dinars).

Construction began in 2008, after being approved by the former Tunisian President Zine El Abidine Ben Ali.

The site is located in the Lac de Tunis area in the northern suburbs of the city. The entire site is currently an uninhabited green space. The Lac de Tunis area is the major focus for new development and building activity in Tunis, and it has seen an increasing number of multi-national companies setting up offices there. The site is bordered by two roads, the main Rue de Lac on one side and the motorway connecting Tunis with the suburbs on the other.

The first part of the project is Cedar, a housing district made up of 11 high-rise apartment buildings, approximately 50 standard villas and grand villas, as well as 13 blocks of low-rise townhouses/apartments which will be called the village. The Tunis Sports City, which will cover an area of 257 hectares, will include several spaces of entertainment activities through academies in various sport disciplines like tennis, golf and swimming.

The project also includes sports academies, a 20,000 capacity football stadium, a swimming centre with an Olympic-size swimming pool, a thalassotherapy centre, and an indoors sports services centre.
