= Orange Tunisia =

Orange Tunisia acquired a license in Tunisia on 5 May 2010, making it the leading 3G mobile operator with Divona Telecom, the second landline operator and the third mobile phone operator in Tunisia. Having been granted under fraudulent terms, the Tunisian State confiscated the 51% of the company belonging to a son-in-law of Ben Ali on 29 March 2011.
