= Kent Business School =

Business school at the University of Kent, UK

Coordinates: 51.2983°N 1.0621°E

- The University of Kent Business School at Canterbury and Medway
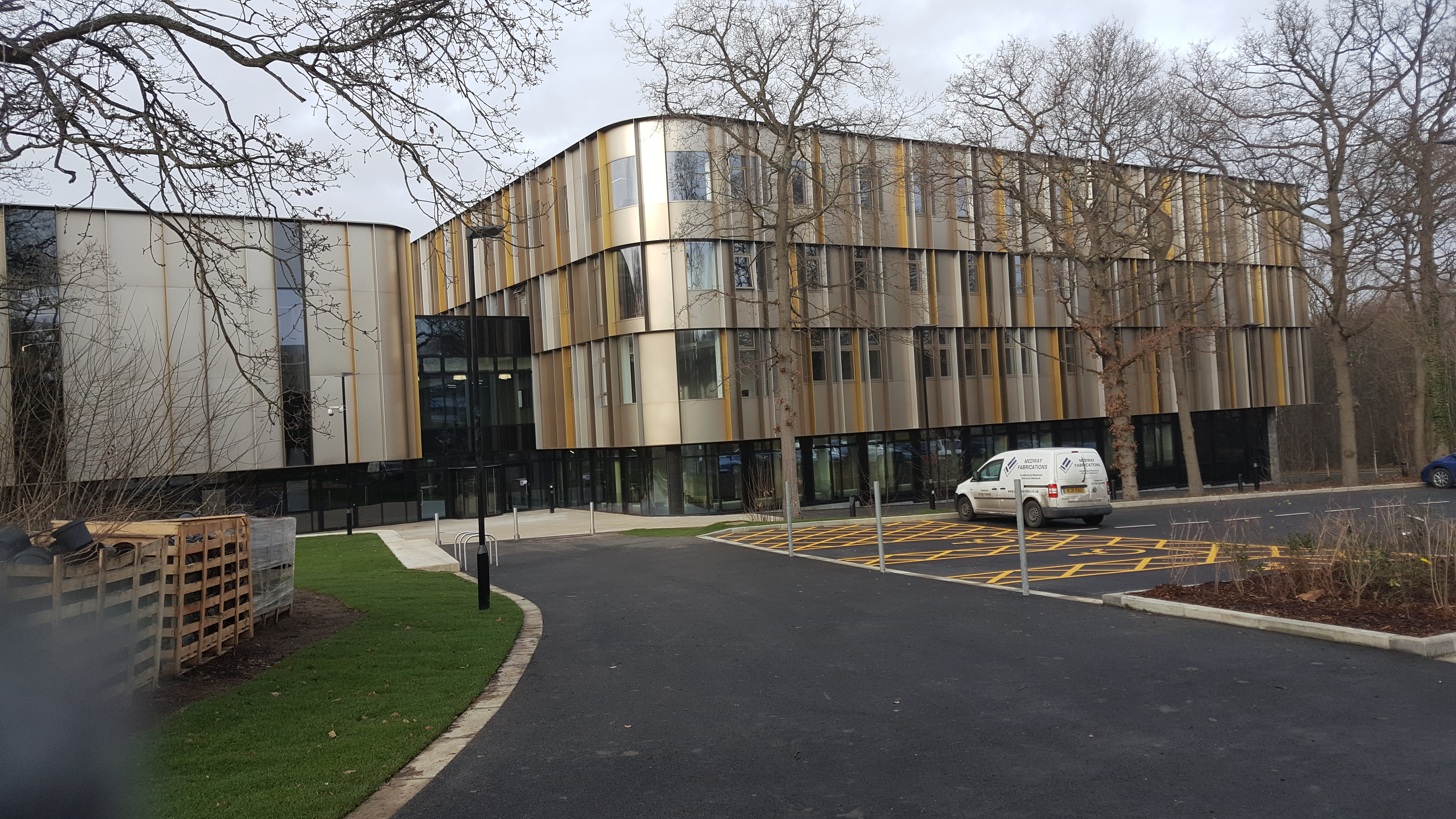
- Type: Business School
- Established: 1988
- Parent institution: University of Kent
- Dean: Marian Garcia
- Students: 9289 (Faculty of Social Sciences)
- Undergraduates: 1822
- Postgraduates: 346
- Doctoral students: 54
- Location: Canterbury and Medway, United Kingdom
- Campus: Semi-rural
Colours
- Website: www.kent.ac.uk/kbs

Kent Business School (KBS) is the business school of the University of Kent. Since opening in 1988, it offers undergraduate, postgraduate, MBA and PhD programmes.

KBS is sited in two locations, at The University of Kent campus in Canterbury and at Medway on Chatham Historic Dockyard.

In March 2017, Kent Business School at the Canterbury Campus moved into its new home, The Sibson Building, named after the University of Kent's third Vice-Chancellor, Professor Robin Sibson.

== Rankings & reputation ==
League Table Performance

- 31st in the UK for Business and Management Studies (The Complete University Guide 2021)
- 26th in the UK for Accounting and Finance (The Complete University Guide 2021)
- 9th in the UK for Marketing (The Complete University Guide 2021)

== Degree programmes ==
The University of Kent's business school currently runs a variety of Undergraduate, Postgraduate, PhD programmes and an MBA. At undergraduate level, competition for places at KBS are relatively competitive with the average KBS student achieving ABB-AAB at A-Level to secure a place

=== Undergraduate ===
- BSc (Hons) Accounting and Finance
- BA (Hons) Business and Management
- BA (Hons) Business (top-up)
- BSc (Hons) Finance and Investment
- BSc (Hons) International Business
- BSc (Hons) Management
- BSc (Hons) Marketing

Programmes are also offered with the opportunity to take a Year Abroad or a Year in Industry.

=== Postgraduate ===
- MSc Business Analytics
- MSc Digital Marketing and Analytics
- MSc Finance (Finance and Management)
- MSc Finance (Finance, Investment and Risk)
- MSc Finance (Financial Markets)
- MSc Finance (International Banking and Finance)
- MSc Healthcare Management
- MSc Human Resource Management
- MSc International Business and Management
- MSc Logistics and Supply Chain Management
- MSc Management
- MSc Marketing
- MSc Project Management
- The Kent MBA

=== PhD ===
- Accounting
- Finance
- Management
- Management Science
- Marketing
- Operational Research

== Organisational relationships ==
The Business School has a variety of links with companies and organisations as well as other academic institutions.

The school's academic network includes:

- Austria: Universität Innsbruck, Innsbruck
- Germany: EBS Universität für Wirtschaft und Recht, Wiesbaden
- Germany: Freie Universität Berlin, Berlin
- France: ESSEC Business School, Paris
- France: Neoma Business School, Rouen and Rheims
- France: ESC Rennes School of Business, Rennes
- France: Jean Moulin University Lyon 3, Lyon
- Italy: Università Carlo Cattaneo, Castellanza
- Italy: Università degli Studi di Firenze, Florence
- Spain: IE Business School, Madrid
- Sweden: Stockholm University, Stockholm
- China: Renmin University of China, Beijing
- Hong Kong: Hong Kong Baptist University
- Hong Kong: University of Hong Kong

== Research ==
Kent Business School carries out research related activities including workshops, conferences and research seminar series. This has led to a large number of international collaborations and to over 200 co-authored papers with international partners.

Research groups include; Accounting, Finance, Management Science, Marketing, People Management and Organisation, Strategy and International Business.

Research centres include; The Centre for Quantitative Finance and The Centre for Logistics and Heuristic Optimisation.
