= ESIC University =

Private university in Spain

Coordinates: 41.39616°N 2.14592°E

ESIC Business & Marketing School
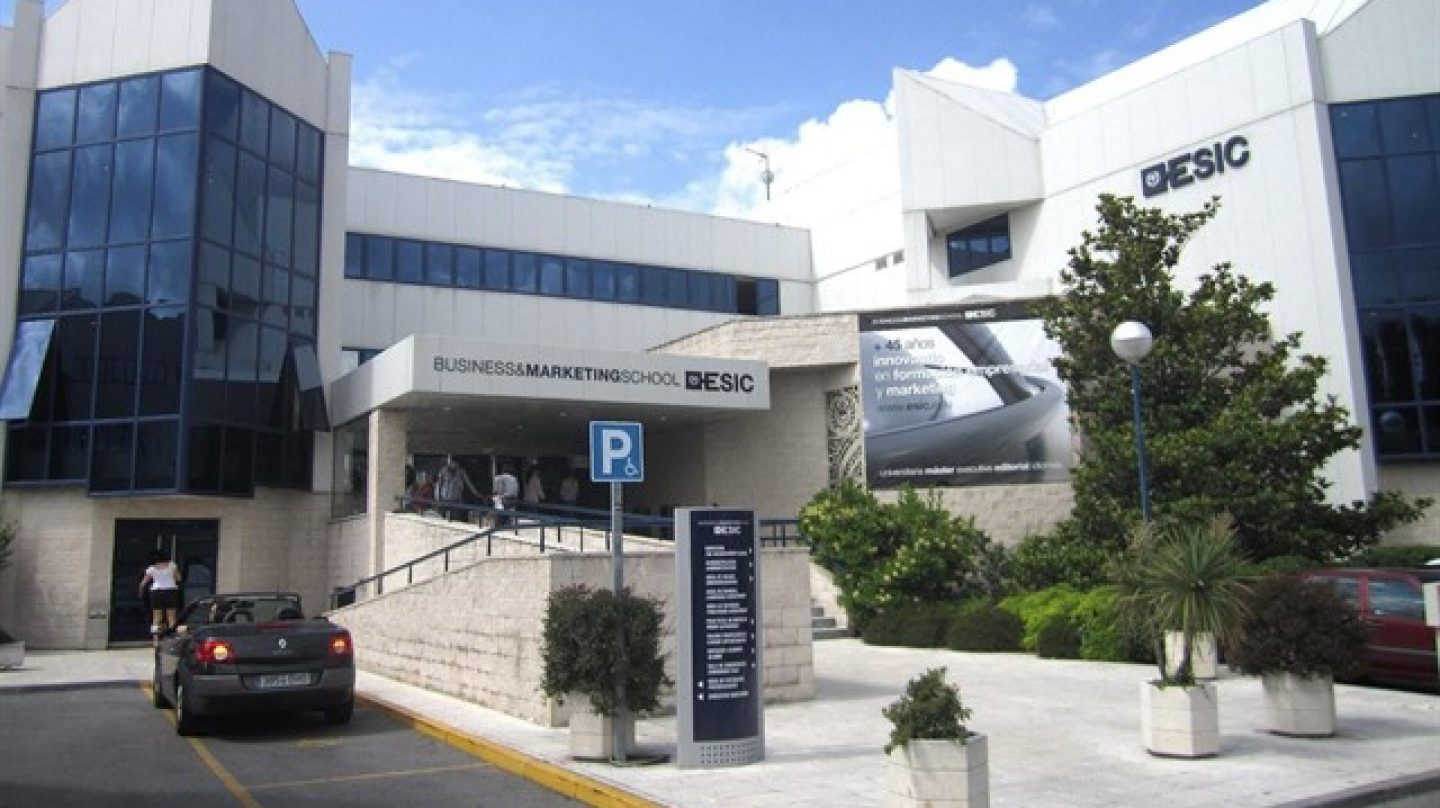
- Former name: Escuela Superior de Ingenieros Comerciales (ESIC)
- Motto: "Transforming People"
- Type: Private business school
- Established: 1965
- Founder: Priests of the Sacred Heart
- Affiliations: AMBA
- Director: Eduardo Gómez Martín
- Location: Pozuelo de Alarcón, Spain
- Website: www.esic.edu

ESIC University is a private university located in Pozuelo de Alarcón, Spain, specialized in Marketing, Management and Digital Business. They are also found throughout Spain in cities such as Malaga, Barcelona, Pamplona, Seville, Granada, Zaragoza, Bilbao, and Valencia.

Founded in 1965 as Escuela Superior de Ingenieros Comerciales (ESIC) by the religious congregation Priests of the Sacred Heart to train business professionals, ESIC was the first business school created in Spain for professionals in need to improve their training in the area of Marketing. It was later named ESIC Business & Marketing School, until university recognition was granted in 2019.

It has more than 32,000 alumni students and offers different programs of education, such as Bachelor's, Master's, Postgraduate Courses and Executive Education.

QS Global 250 Business Schools 2017, ranked ESIC as the 7 'Top-tier-employability' Business Schools in Europe.

In 2019, the ranking QS EMBA ranked ESIC Business & Marketing School MBA as 1st in Career Outcomes of Alumni.

ESIC's prestigious master's degree in Marketing and Sales Management (GESCO), has continuously been ranked as 1st in Spain in the Marketing category by El Mundo newspaper.

The school also organises every year one of the most important Marketing & Management conferences in Spain, called 'Hoy es Marketing', with around 33000 attendees.
