= ESC Rennes School of Business =

French business school

Coordinates: 48.1288°N 1.69265°W

Rennes School of Business
- École Supérieure de Commerce de Rennes (ESC Rennes)
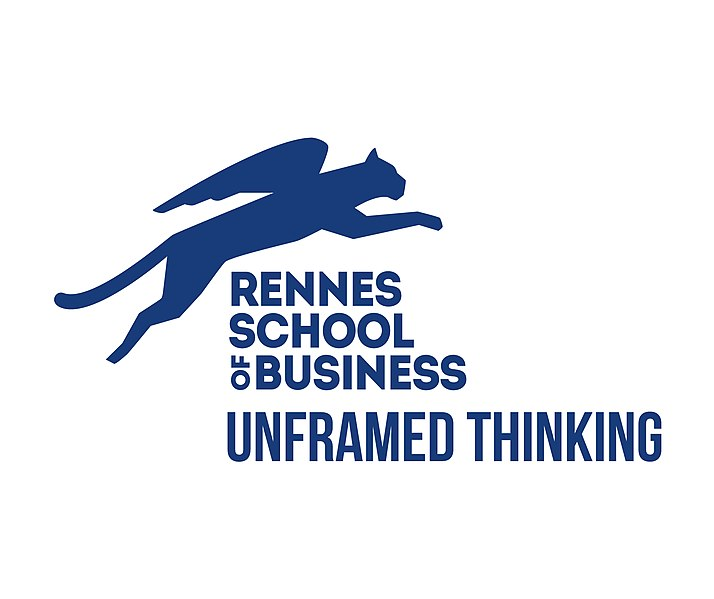
- Motto: Unframed Thinking
- Type: Grande école de commerce et de management (Private research university Business school)
- Established: 1990; 36 years ago
- Accreditation: Triple accreditation: AACSB;AMBA;EQUIS
- Academic affiliations: Conférence des Grandes Écoles
- President: Emmanuel Thaunier
- Dean: Adilson Borges
- Faculty: 100
- Students: 5,000
- Location: Rennes (Brittany, France); Paris (9th Arrondissement)
- Language: English
- Website: www.rennes-sb.com

Rennes School of Business (France)

Rennes School of Business formerly École Supérieure de Commerce de Rennes is a French business school located in Rennes, the capital of Brittany, founded in 1990 by the Chamber of Commerce and Industry of Rennes. ESC Rennes is a Grande École, a term to refer to business schools with government recognition in France.

== History ==
Rennes School of Business, founded in 1990, is a research-based business school based in Rennes, Brittany, France. As the school grew, its premises were expanded, with Building 2 opening in 2010, Building 3 in 2014 and Building 4 in 2017, closed in 2025. In September 2021, a new campus was opened in the 9th arrondissement of Paris.

Based on its student body and faculty composition, Rennes School of Business is classified as an international business school in France. 50% of students on campus and 85% of the faculty members come from outside France, representing over 100 nationalities. A majority of the courses are taught in English.

Important years in the school's history:

- 1990 - École Supérieure de Commerce de Rennes (ESC Rennes) founded.
- 1996 - ESC Rennes joins European Foundation for Management Development (EFMD)
- 1998 - ESC Rennes joins Conférence des Grandes Écoles
- 2004 - Master of Science programme introduced
- 2007 - School renamed ESC Rennes School of Business
- 2004 - Bachelor programme introduced
- 2010 - School opens a second campus in Rennes
- 2012 - AACSB accreditation
- 2013 - AMBA accreditation
- 2014 - EQUIS accreditation. ESC Rennes joins the 1% of business schools with the Triple Crown.
- 2016 - School renamed Rennes School of Business
- 2017 - Opening of a residence campus for international students
- 2019 - Creation of the Chair of Geopolitics
- 2020 - Creation of the Chair in Cyber Risk Governance
- 2021 - New campus opens in Paris

== Rankings ==
Publishing Institution	Financial Times				QS World University Rankings			
Ranking classification	European Business School	Executive MBA	Masters in Management	Masters in Finance	Masters in Finance	Masters In Management	Masters In Business Analytics	Masters in Marketing
2016	56	-	35	45	-	-	-	-
2017	53	-	55	32	-	-	-	-
2018	56	90	55	24	-	-	-	-
2019	56	97	51	24	-	-	-	-
2020	68	-	54	29	-	-	-	-
2021	88	-	-	24	101+	101+	51+	51+
2022	57	50	49	23	151+	131-140	101+	81-90

== Programmes ==
Rennes School of Business offers multiple programmes, from undergraduate to PhD level:.

- Bachelor in Management (BiM)
- 7 specialised Master's programmes:
  - Master in Digital Marketing Management (DMM)
  - Master in International Finance (IF)
  - Master in International Business, Negotiation & Geopolitics (IBNG)
  - Master in Culture, Creative and Luxury Industries (CCLI)
  - Master in Data Analytics, Intelligence & Security (DAIS)
  - Master in Logistics and Supply Chain Management (LSCM)
  - Master 2 in Strategic Management of Transitions (STM)
- Master in Management (Programme Grande École)
- Master of Science in International Management
- International MBA (iMBA)
- PhD (full-time programmes in Rennes, France, in cooperation with University College Dublin and the University of Amsterdam)
- Global Doctor of Business Administration (GDBA) (part-time programme for executives in China, Brazil and France).
- Executive MBA
- Sustainable Executive MBA Paris

== Research ==
=== Research programmes ===
Rennes offers the following research programmes:

- MPhil and PhD (full-time programmes in Rennes, France, in cooperation with University College Dublin and the University of Amsterdam)
- Doctor of Business Administration (DBA) (part-time programme for executives in China, Brazil and France)

The Global DBA programme is organised in cooperation with the School of Economics and Management at Beijing University of Post and Telecommunications in China and (as a pre-DBA) with Fundação Getulio Vargas in Rio de Janeiro, Brazil.

=== Research at Rennes SB is organised into ===
- The Research Lab, a hub which supports the researchers on a daily basis and organises research activities.
- The PhD programme which is for students looking to have careers in research.
- The Centre for Unframed Thinking (CUT), the first Institute for Advanced Study to be launched in a business school.
- 5 research centres working on current issues.
  - Agribusiness (AGR)
  - AI-Driven Business (AI)
  - Green, Digital & Demand-driven Supply Chain Management (G3D)
  - Rethinking Tomorrow’s Organisation (RTO)
  - Financial Market & Corporate Outcomes (FMCO)

== Alumni Association ==
The Rennes School of Business Alumni Association works in close partnership with Rennes School of Business and international companies to provide services to the global Rennes School of Business alumni community. The alumni network includes over 25000 members in over 100 countries.
