= Católica Lisbon School of Business & Economics =

School in Lisbon, Portugal

- Type: business school
- Established: 1972
- Dean: Prof. Doutor Filipe Santos
- Academic staff: 80
- Undergraduates: 1,000
- Postgraduates: 800
- Location: Lisbon, Portugal
- Campus: Palma de Cima, Lisboa
- Affiliations: Catholic University of Portugal
- Website: www.clsbe.lisboa.ucp.pt/

Católica Lisbon School of Business & Economics (also known as Católica Lisbon SBE or CLSBE) is a leading business school in Portugal. It is the business school of the Catholic University of Portugal (also known as Católica Lisbon, UCP, or simply Católica), a concordatory university, and one of best European business schools according to the Financial Times located in Lisbon, Portugal. The first undergraduate program in management at Católica Lisbon was established in 1972, two years before the Carnation Revolution.

== History ==
In 1972, Católica Lisbon established their first undergraduate program in Management. In 1989, the school took on its current form when the Business and Economics departments merged to form Católica Lisbon SBE. Their MBA program was then established in 1991, followed shortly thereafter with the launch of Executive Education in 1992. In 1997, the school launched its first foreign program of Executive Education in Angola.

2007 was a big year for the school – the first MSc program launched which was designed in accord with the Bologna Process. The Lisbon MBA also launched that year, and the school received Triple Crown accreditation. 2007 was also the year that Católica Lisbon SBE first appeared on the Financial Times Ranking, the first Portuguese Business School to do so.

== Programs ==
Católica Lisbon SBE is a full service business school, offering Undergraduate, Masters of Science, Executive Masters, MBA, Doctoral, and Executive Education programs.

=== Undergraduate ===
Católica Lisbon SBE offers Undergraduate programs in Management and Economics, each of which are three years long. Starting in the second year, many of the lectures are in English. There are also International versions of both of these programs in which all lectures are in English.

=== Masters of Science ===
Católica Lisbon SBE offers full-time Masters of Science (MSc) programs in Management, Economics, and Finance. The MSc programs are taught entirely in English. Students also have the option of double or joint degrees across subjects.

=== Executive Masters ===
Católica Lisbon SBE offers Executive Masters courses on a part-time basis in Finance and Management (with concentration in Leadership Development or Strategic Marketing). The Executive Master in Finance is taught entirely in English.

=== The Lisbon MBA ===
Together with Nova School of Business and Economics, Católica Lisbon SBE runs The Lisbon MBA, the leading MBA program in Portugal, ranked 36th globally by the Financial Times. This MBA program comes in two forms. The Lisbon MBA International is a one-year full-time program which includes a one-month study period at MIT Sloan School of Management and a two-month Action Learning period in Portugal or abroad, such as in Brazil. The Lisbon MBA Part Time is a two-year part-time program, based entirely in Portugal.

=== Doctoral ===
Católica Lisbon SBE offers a PhD program in Technological Change & Entrepreneurship, run as a partnership with other leading institutions in Lisbon and Carnegie Mellon University. It includes extended study periods at Carnegie Mellon's campus in Pittsburgh.

=== Executive education ===
Católica Lisbon SBE offers a variety of open-enrollment and customized programs for Executive Education. CLSBE is the leading provider of Executive Education in Portugal.

== Center for Technological Innovation and Entrepreneurship ==
Launched in May 2018, The Center for Technological Innovation and Entrepreneurship (CTIE) is a center created to link the academic world and the entrepreneurship and innovation ecosystem. The center is part of Católica Lisbon School of Business and Economics.

The founder and Academic director of the center is Celine Abecassis-Moedas, the Dean for Executive Education.

The center is financially sponsored by Patrick and Lina Drahi Foundation for a five-year period.

=== Work and activities ===
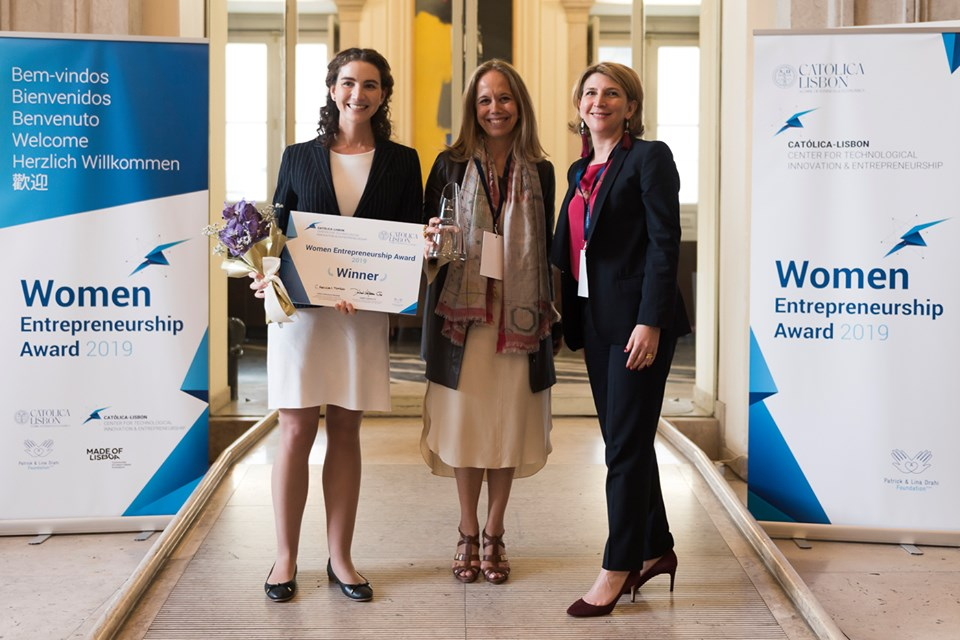
From left to right: Joana Rafael, Winner of the WEA, Isabel Gil, the rector of the Portuguese Catholic university and Celine Abecassis-Moedas, The Academic director and founder and the CTIE.

The activities of the center follow three dimensions. The first dimension is research where the center is financially supporting and encouraging researchers in the area of Technological innovation and entrepreneurship. The second dimension is education, as the center is delivering classes and sessions for undergraduates, graduates and executive education. Finally, CTIE works on the dissemination of the academic knowledge through their institutional communication (through journals, books, articles) and their institutional partnerships with various actors of the entrepreneurship scene to connect them to the academic one of the university.

=== Events ===
The center for Technological Innovation and Entrepreneurship participates in various events held by the stakeholders of the university but also creates events.

The Women Entrepreneurship Award was a ceremony held the first week of May 2019 that had the purpose of promoting women entrepreneurship and award the best women-managed and created start-ups. The winner was Joana Rafael, Co-founder of Sensei, a start-up working in the retail industry.

== Facts and figures ==
Católica Lisbon is ranked one of the best business school in Portugal and 23rd best among European business schools. Its flagship program International Master of Science in Management is ranked 30th worldwide in the Financial Times Masters in Management 2018 ranking. The Lisbon MBA is a joint full-time program with Nova School of Business and Economics and ranks 15th worldwide.

Second Portuguese business school accredited by Triple Crown: AACSB, EFMD, and AMBA.

First undergraduate program in Business in Portugal.

Ranked Best Executive Education Program in Portugal.
