= EFMD Quality Improvement System =

International school accreditation system

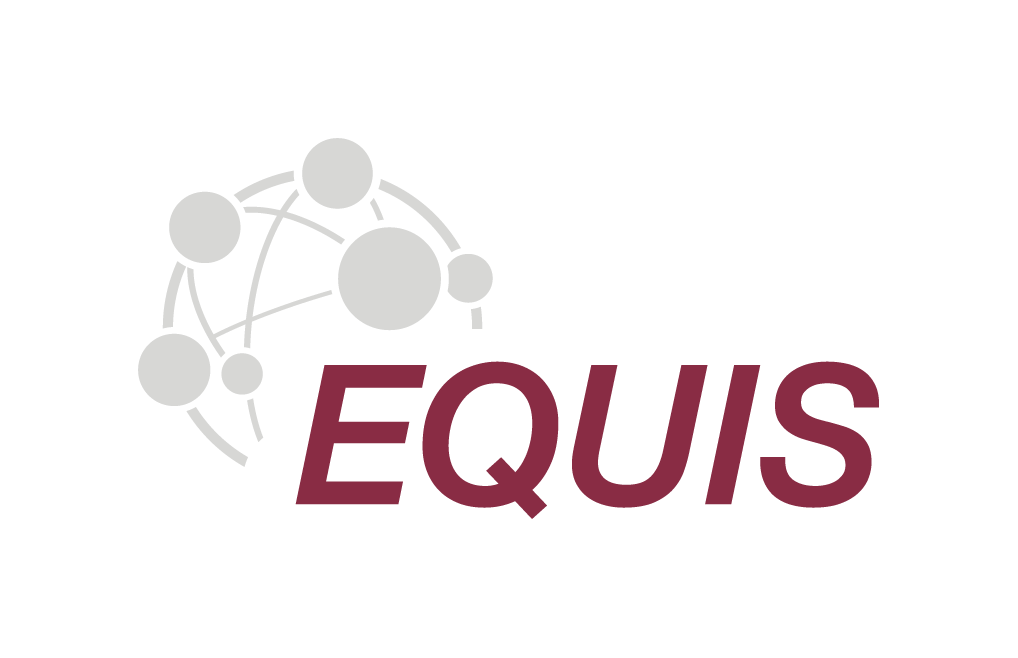
The logo of the EQUIS

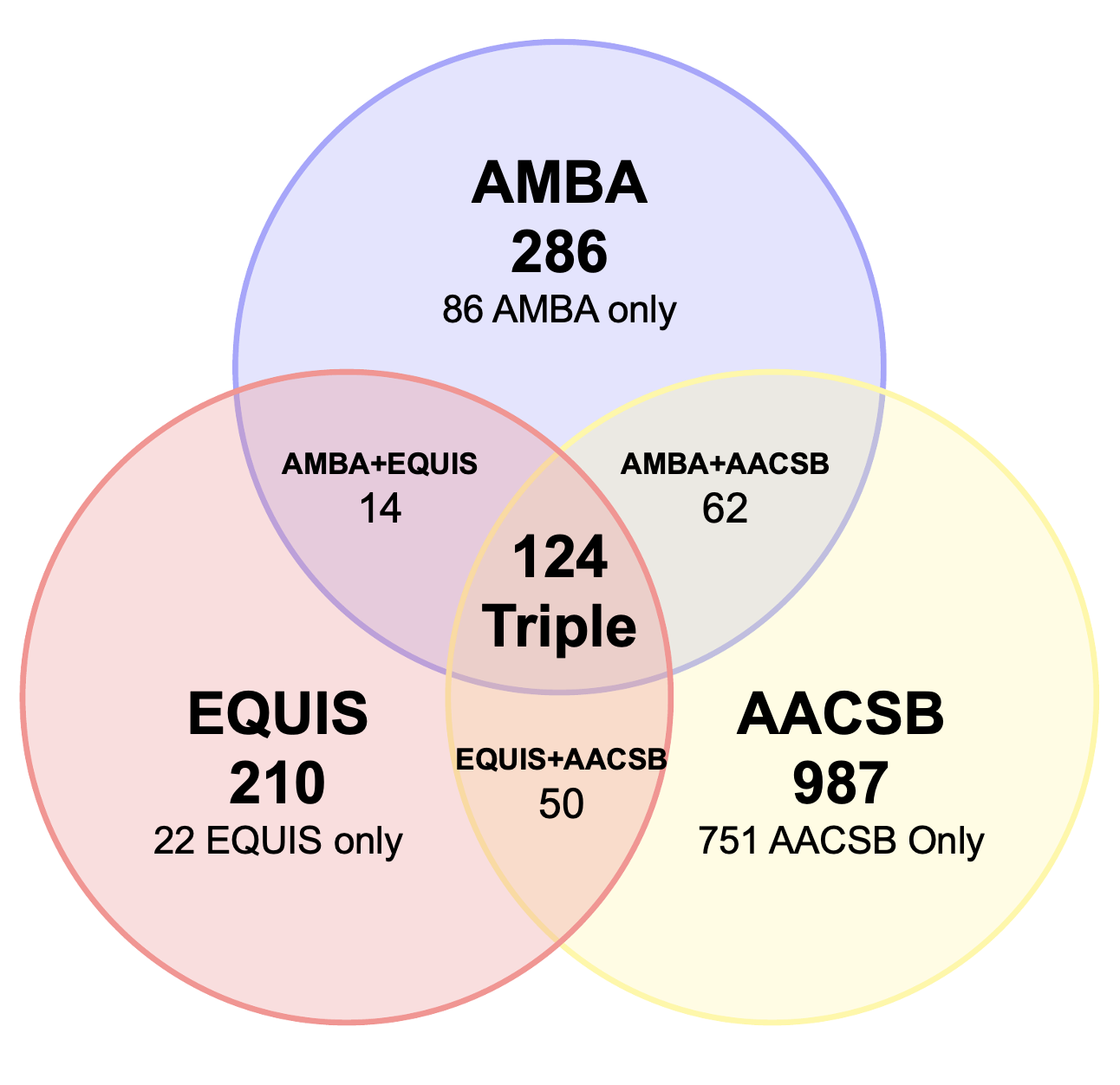
Number of schools worldwide with single, double, and triple AACSB-AMBA-EQUIS accreditation as of 2023

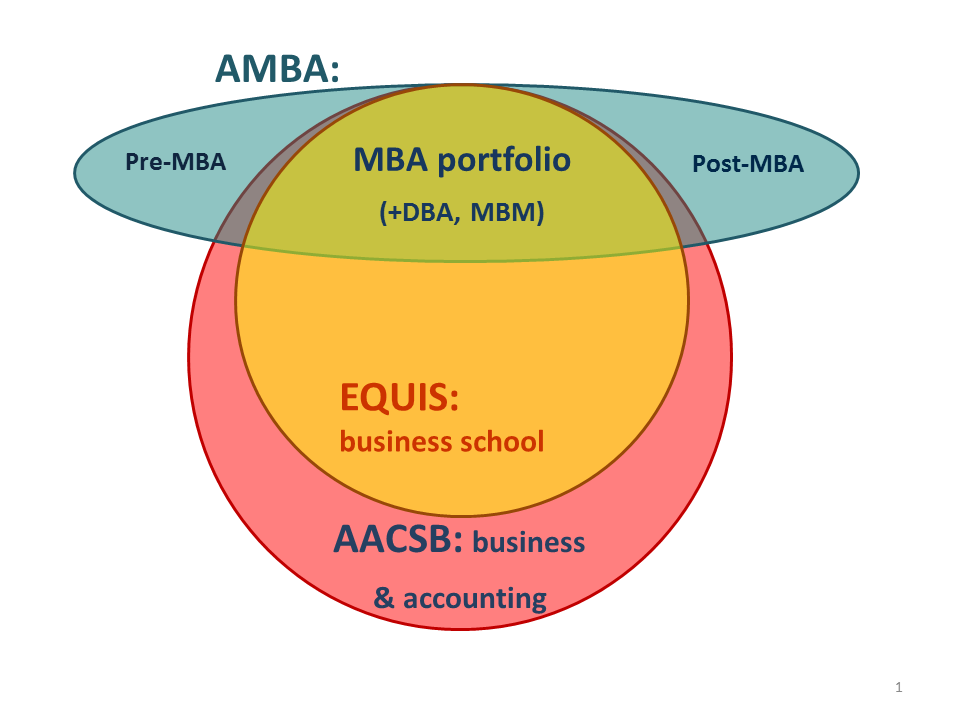
The scope of business school accreditations for AACSB, EQUIS and AMBA

The EFMD Quality Improvement System (EQUIS) is a business school accreditation run by the Brussels-based European Foundation for Management Development (EFMD). EQUIS accredits higher education institutions of management and business administration, and is considered one of the triple accreditation.

As of September 2025, EQUIS has accredited 228 institutions in 45 countries around the world. In 2022, EQUIS suspended all higher education institutions in Russia from its ranking.

== History ==
EQUIS was established in 1997 by the European Foundation for Management Development (EFMD) as a framework to raise standards in business and management education. In 1995, EFMD created the EQUAL (European Quality Link) group, composed of national management education associations from several European countries, to evaluate the feasibility of developing an accreditation system and to define its scope. The resulting initiative, EQUIS, was designed not only as an accreditation process but also as a platform for continuous improvement and mutual learning among institutions.

From the outset, its features included an emphasis on connections between business schools and the corporate world, reflecting EFMD’s combined academic and corporate membership, and a collaborative approach that encouraged institutions with different strengths to share practices and enhance quality collectively. Over the years, EQUIS broadened its focus on internationalization. In the 1990s, it largely centered on student mobility programs, and later came to encompass deeper institutional partnerships and strategic collaborations worldwide.

EQUIS has developed into a global accreditation system that emphasizes high academic standards, corporate relevance, internationalization, and continuous improvement in management education.

As of 2019, the EQUIS director is Alfons Sauquet. With almost 30 years of existence, the organization has accredited 228 institutions in 45 countries.

== Object of the accreditation ==
The accreditation is awarded to business schools based on general quality. The process also takes into account the business school's level of internationalization, which is not a strict requirement for accreditation by the other two major international accreditation bodies: AACSB and AMBA. EQUIS accreditation is granted on the basis of a broad institutional review that examines the overall quality of a business school. The evaluation framework covers governance and strategy, program portfolio, student body, faculty qualifications, research activities, and the school’s contribution to its wider community. In addition to internationalization, it places particular emphasis on areas such as connections with corporate practice, and the integration of ethics, responsibility, and sustainability into the school’s activities. The process is designed to assess both academic rigor and practical relevance, with attention to how the institution demonstrates continuous improvement and maintains quality across all its operations. All fully accredited EQUIS business schools applying for AACSB accreditation have succeeded, which has not been the case the other way.

EQUIS accreditation can be granted for three years (with annual progress reports on the areas of improvement required) or for five years (with a mid-term progress report on development objectives required).

== Accreditation process ==
EQUIS accreditation involves a structured, multi-stage institutional review conducted by EFMD. The process begins with a self-assessment, during which the school compiles a Self-Assessment Report aligned with the ten chapters of the EQUIS Standards and Criteria. This may be preceded by optional pre-review advisory support from EFMD experts to enhance readiness. Next, a peer review visit is conducted by a team of international evaluators, who assess the institution’s compliance with EQUIS quality dimensions and submit their findings in a Peer Review Report. The report, including a recommendation regarding accreditation, goes to the Accreditation Board, which grants either a five-year, three-year, or no accreditation outcome. Following accreditation, the school is expected to pursue ongoing improvement, with a mid-term review for five-year accreditations or annual progress reports for three-year accreditations.

== See also ==
- Association of MBAs (AMBA)
- Association to Advance Collegiate Schools of Business (AACSB)
- List of EQUIS accredited institutions
- Triple accreditation
