= Association of MBAs =

Educational organization

- Association of MBAs
- Abbreviation: AMBA
- Formation: 1967
- Headquarters: London, United Kingdom
- Region served: Global
- Members: 277 accredited schools; >50,000 members
- Key people: Andrew Main Wilson (Chief Executive); Bodo Schlegelmilch (Chair of the Board)
- Website: associationofmbas.com

The Association of MBAs (AMBA) is a global organisation headquartered in London, UK. It was founded in 1967 with the primary objective of accrediting Master of Business Administration (MBA) programmes.

== Roles ==
Based in London, AMBA is one of the three main global accreditation bodies in business education (see triple accreditation) and styles itself as the world's impartial authority on postgraduate management education. It differs from AACSB in the US and EQUIS in Brussels as it accredits a school's portfolio of postgraduate management programmes but does not accredit undergraduate programmes. AMBA accredits approximately 2% of the world's business schools, and is the most international of the three organisations having accredited schools headquartered in 54 countries, compared with the 52 for AACSB and 38 for EQUIS.

Business schools can become associated with AMBA by applying for accreditation or by applying to be part of the AMBA Development Network.

All MBA students and alumni of the 277 accredited member schools receive free life-long individual AMBA membership. AMBA also accredits generalist BBA programmes, MBA programmes and DBA programmes, and admits as members students and graduates thereof.

AMBA's long-serving president until 2017 was the late Sir Paul Judge, the founding benefactor of Cambridge Judge Business School in Cambridge, UK. AMBA's current Chief Executive is Andrew Main Wilson, who joined the organisation from the Institute of Directors in 2013. Bodo Schlegelmilch was elected Chairman of the AMBA Board of Trustees in 2018.

== History ==
The Association of MBAs was founded in 1967 as an MBA alumni club by eight UK graduates from Harvard Business School, Wharton, Stanford and Columbia, and two graduates from the first intake of London Business School. The founders saw a lack of awareness in Europe of the value of the MBA degree, which at that time was primarily an American qualification. They decided to form a lobby and membership group to promote the benefits of postgraduate business education, under the name of Business Graduates Association (BGA). The organisation's development helped shape the growth of management education in Europe and the UK and coincided with the setting up and growth of London Business School and Manchester Business School in Britain.

The Association's first Director General was Vice-Admiral David Clutterbuck who assumed this position in 1969. In 1983 BGA began to accredit the growing number of MBA programmes, while preserving its functions as a membership organization. BGA was renamed Association of MBAs in 1987. Until 2017, AMBA's president was the late Sir Paul Judge, who helped establish Cambridge Judge Business School at Cambridge University in the early 1990s.

== Activities ==
=== Accreditation ===
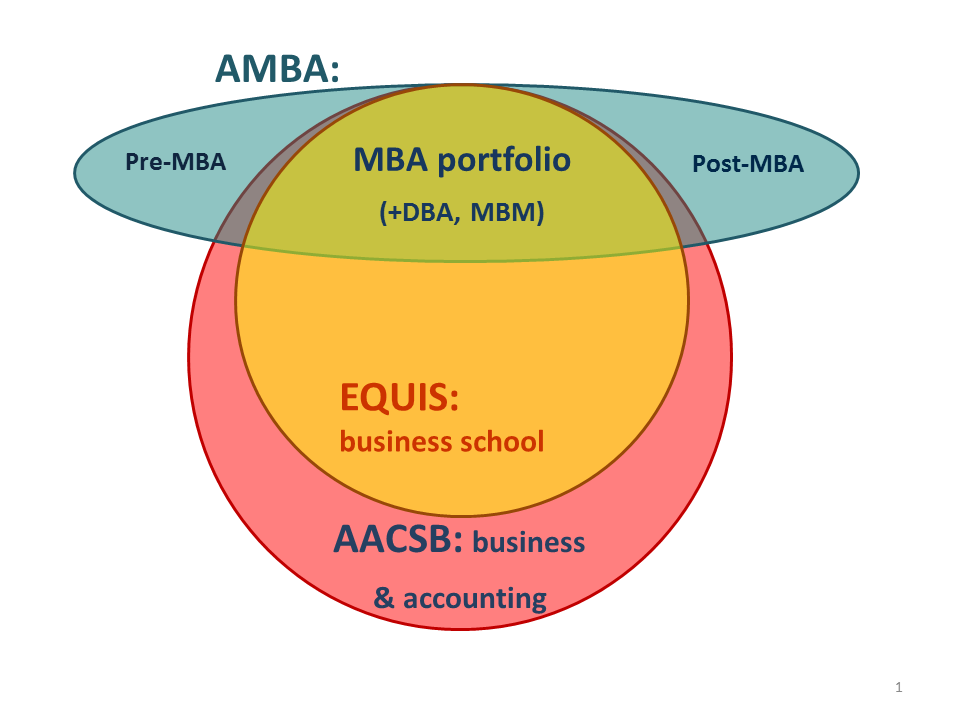
Scope of business school accreditation for AACSB, EQUIS and AMBA

The Association of MBAs accredits MBA, MBM and DBA degree programmes. When a school applies for accreditation for its MBA programmes, AMBA requires that the entire portfolio of MBA programmes be put up for consideration and will award accreditation only if all programmes meet its criteria (though the school pays the same fee regardless of the number of programmes being reviewed).

The Association's process of accrediting a school's MBA programmes portfolio includes reviewing compliance AMBA's criteria, most of them qualitative rather than quantitative. The criteria fall into seven dimensions: history and development of the institution; facilities and libraries; teaching faculty, teaching standards and research track record; programme administration, career and alumni services; student admission standards, diversity and cohort size; curriculum content, programme mode and duration; and learning outcomes.

Some of the key AMBA criteria for the accreditation of an MBA programme include:

- all admitted students should have at least three years of full-time post-graduation work experience upon the start of the MBA course (a criterion which the vast majority of the top US business schools cannot meet as US MBA programmes sometimes admit applicants with only a bachelor's degree and no work experience);
- a new school applying for accreditation should have a track record of at least three years of graduating MBA students before it can be accredited;
- an MBA programme should have a cohort size of at least 20 students;
- at least 50% of the faculty of an MBA programme (including visiting faculty as part of the total) are expected to have PhD degrees; and
- a full-time MBA curriculum should contain no less than 500 contact (scheduled faculty-mediated) hours and a distance-learning MBA programme should have no less than 120 synchronous contact hours.

=== Events ===
AMBA holds three annual conferences for business school deans and directors: a Global Conference, an Asia Pacific Conference, and a Latin America Conference. Participation is open to both accredited and non-accredited schools. AMBA also hosts an annual Gala Dinner in London, which is open only to accredited schools.

AMBA organises two annual global forums with the purpose of development and training for specific functions within AMBA-accredited business schools such as accreditation managers; programme managers; marketing, admissions, alumni and development staff.

AMBA also organises webinars, lectures and networking events on a regular basis catering to MBA alumni, current MBA students, prospective MBA students and business school admissions departments. These on-campus events are held at accredited business schools and often feature distinguished speakers and practitioners in fields such as leadership, entrepreneurship and innovation.

== See also ==
- List of institutions accredited by AMBA
- Triple accreditation
- Association to Advance Collegiate Schools of Business (AACSB)
- European Quality Improvement System (EQUIS)
