= University of Hong Kong Faculty of Social Sciences =

Social sciences faculty of the University of Hong Kong

Faculty of Social Sciences, The University of Hong Kong
- 香港大學社會科學學院
- Type: Faculty
- Established: 1967; 59 years ago
- Parent institution: University of Hong Kong
- Dean: Ming Wen
- Students: 4,000+
- Location: 11/F, The Jockey Club Tower, Centennial Campus, The University of Hong Kong, Pok Fu Lam, Hong Kong
- Website: web.socsc.hku.hk

The Faculty of Social Sciences of the University of Hong Kong (Chinese: 香港大學社會科學學院) is the social sciences faculty of the University of Hong Kong (HKU). Established in 1967, the faculty comprises academic units in geography, politics and public administration, psychology, social work and social administration, sociology, media, and governance and public policy.

The faculty is based in The Jockey Club Tower on HKU's Centennial Campus. Its dean is sociologist Ming Wen, who joined HKU as dean in 2022. The faculty has more than 4,000 students and around 30,000 alumni.

== History ==
The Faculty of Social Sciences was established in 1967. At its establishment, it comprised the Department of Economics and Political Science, Department of Philosophy and Psychology, Department of Social Work, Department of Sociology and Department of Statistics.

The Department of Philosophy and Psychology was reorganised in 1968, resulting in the establishment of a separate Department of Psychology. In 1969, a Department of Law was established within the faculty with three academic staff and an initial intake of 40 students.

The Department of Economics and Political Science was divided into separate Departments of Economics and Political Science in 1970. In 1972, following the growth of the Department of Law, the faculty was renamed the Faculty of Social Sciences and Law.

Law became a separate School of Law in 1978, after which the faculty resumed the name Faculty of Social Sciences. The School of Law was subsequently elevated to become the independent Faculty of Law in 1984.

The Department of Social Work was renamed the Department of Social Work and Social Administration in 1989, while the Department of Political Science became the Department of Politics and Public Administration in 1993.

The faculty previously included academic units that later became part of other faculties. The Department of Economics developed into the School of Economics and Finance, which became part of the newly established Faculty of Business and Economics in 2001. The Department of Statistics and Actuarial Science was also formerly a constituent department of the Faculty of Social Sciences before its transfer to the Faculty of Science.

In 2008, the faculty introduced Social Innovation and Global Citizenship as graduation requirements for its undergraduate students.

The faculty moved to The Jockey Club Tower on HKU's newly developed Centennial Campus in 2012. Prior to the development of the Centennial Campus, departments of the Faculty of Social Sciences were among the academic units housed in the K. K. Leung Building, which opened in 1989 and also housed the Faculty of Law.

=== 2025 research paper retraction ===
In December 2025, a research paper co-authored by Professor Paul Yip of the Department of Social Work and Social Administration, who was then an associate dean of the faculty, was retracted following concerns over its references. An investigation by HKU found that the paper contained non-existent references generated using artificial intelligence which had not been disclosed by a doctoral student involved in the research.

Following the investigation, Yip stepped down as an associate dean and withdrew from research committees of the faculty and the university. The doctoral student involved was also made subject to the university's disciplinary procedures.

== Academic organisation ==
The faculty comprises five departments:

- Department of Geography
- Department of Politics and Public Administration
- Department of Psychology
- Department of Social Work and Social Administration
- Department of Sociology

HKU also allocates two interdisciplinary schools to the Faculty of Social Sciences, in conjunction with other faculties.

=== School of Future Media ===
The School of Future Media was established on 1 October 2025. It is jointly allocated to the Faculty of Social Sciences and the Faculty of Arts, with the Faculty of Social Sciences serving as the administering faculty.

The school incorporates the university's Journalism and Media Studies Centre, a Division of Documentary and AI Filmmaking and the Global Creative Industries programme, which was previously based in the Faculty of Arts.

=== School of Governance and Policy ===
The School of Governance and Policy was established in 2025 and is jointly allocated to the Faculty of Social Sciences, HKU Business School and the Faculty of Law. The Faculty of Social Sciences serves as its administering faculty.

The Asia Global Institute and the Centre on Contemporary China and the World are affiliated with the school.

== Undergraduate programmes ==
The faculty offers a number of undergraduate degree programmes.

The undergraduate programmes include:

- Bachelor of Arts and Sciences in Interdisciplinary Studies
- Bachelor of Arts in Global Creative Industries
- Bachelor of Journalism, Media and Artificial Intelligence
- Bachelor of Psychology
- Bachelor of Social Sciences
- Bachelor of Social Sciences (Government and Laws) and Bachelor of Laws
- Bachelor of Social Work

The Bachelor of Social Sciences is a four-year undergraduate degree under which students may study disciplines including computational social science, geography, politics and public administration, social policy and social development, and sociology.

The Bachelor of Social Sciences (Government and Laws) and Bachelor of Laws is a five-year double-degree programme offered jointly with the Faculty of Law.

Undergraduate students in the faculty undertake experiential learning through the Social Innovation and Global Citizenship requirements, which include off-campus internships and international learning experiences.

=== Dual and collaborative degree programmes ===
The faculty participates in several dual and collaborative degree programmes with overseas and mainland Chinese universities.

The HKU-Peking University Dual Degree Programme in Politics, Philosophy and Economics is jointly offered with Yuanpei College of Peking University. Students spend their first two years at Peking University and the following two years at HKU. Graduates receive a Bachelor of Social Sciences from HKU and a Bachelor of Laws from Peking University.

The faculty also participates in the HKU-University of California, Berkeley Dual Degree Programme. Students following the Social Sciences route spend two years at HKU and two years at the University of California, Berkeley, receiving a Bachelor of Social Sciences from HKU and a Bachelor of Arts from Berkeley.

The faculty also participates in the HKU-Sciences Po Dual Degree Programme, under which students spend two years at Sciences Po in France followed by two years at HKU. Students enrolled through the Faculty of Social Sciences receive a bachelor's degree from Sciences Po and a Bachelor of Social Sciences from HKU.

The faculty also operates a five-year concurrent degree programme with the Graduate Institute of International and Development Studies in Geneva. Participating students complete three years at HKU before undertaking their fourth and fifth years in Geneva, receiving an HKU Bachelor of Social Sciences and a master's degree from the Graduate Institute.

== Postgraduate education ==
The faculty offers taught postgraduate degrees across its constituent disciplines, including programmes in behavioural health, clinical psychology, criminology, educational psychology, geography, journalism, media and culture, public administration, social work and sociology.

Research postgraduate programmes lead to the degrees of Master of Philosophy and Doctor of Philosophy.

== Research centres ==
Research centres and institutes associated with the faculty include:

- Centre on Behavioral Health
- Centre for Civil Society and Governance
- Centre for Criminology
- Hong Kong Jockey Club Centre for Suicide Research and Prevention
- International Centre for China Development Studies
- Sau Po Centre on Ageing
- Social Sciences Research Centre

The faculty also jointly operates the Centre for Water Technology and Policy with the Faculty of Engineering.

== Rankings ==
In the 2026 QS World University Rankings by Subject, the University of Hong Kong was ranked 22nd worldwide and fifth in Asia in the broad subject area of Social Sciences and Management.

Among subjects represented in the faculty, HKU was ranked 11th worldwide in geography, 24th in sociology, 32nd in social policy and administration, 35th in psychology and 53rd in politics in the 2026 QS subject rankings.

== See also ==
- University of Hong Kong
- University of Hong Kong Faculty of Law
- HKU Business School
- Education in Hong Kong
