= List of EQUIS accredited institutions =

This is list of institutions accredited by the European Quality Improvement System (EQUIS) as at 2021.

== Alphabetical ==
=== A ===
- Aalto University School of Business (Aalto University) — Espoo, Finland
- Aarhus School of Business (Aarhus University) — Aarhus, Denmark
- Adam Smith Business School, University of Glasgow — Glasgow, United Kingdom
- Alliance Manchester Business School, University of Manchester — Manchester, United Kingdom
- Amsterdam Business School (Amsterdam University) — Amsterdam, Netherlands
- Antwerp Management School (University of Antwerp) — Antwerp, Belgium
- Antai College of Economics & Management (Shanghai Jiao Tong University) — Shanghai, China
- Ashridge Business School — Ashridge, United Kingdom
- Aston Business School (Aston University) — Aston, United Kingdom
- AUC School of Business (American University in Cairo) — Cairo, Egypt
- Auckland Business School (Auckland University) — Auckland, New Zealand
- Audencia Nantes School of Management — Nantes, France
- Australian School of Business (University of New South Wales) — Sydney, Australia

=== B ===
- Babson College — Wellesley, MA, United States
- Barcelona School of Management, Pompeu Fabra University — Barcelona, Spain
- University of Bath School of Management — Bath, United Kingdom
- Beedie School of Business (Simon Fraser University) — Burnaby, Canada
- Bentley University — Waltham, MA, United States
- BI Norwegian Business School — Oslo, Norway
- Birmingham Business School (Birmingham University) — Birmingham, United Kingdom
- Bologna Business School — Bologna, Italy
- Bond Business School — Gold Coast, Australia
- Bordeaux Management School — Bordeaux, France
- Bradford School of Management (Bradford University) — Bradford, United Kingdom
- Brisbane Graduate School of Business (Queensland University of Technology) — Brisbane, Australia
- Burgundy School of Business — Dijon, France

=== C ===
- Catholic University of Portugal — Lisbon, Portugal
- Cass Business School (City University London) — London, United Kingdom
- Skema Business School — Valbonne, France
- China Europe International Business School — Shanghai, China
- College of Commerce, National Chengchi University — Taipei, Taiwan (ROC)
- Copenhagen Business School — Copenhagen, Denmark
- Coppead Graduate School of Business (Rio de Janeiro Federal University) — Rio de Janeiro, Brazil
- Cranfield School of Management (Cranfield University) — Cranfield, United Kingdom
- Pontifical Catholic University of Peru Centrum Graduate Business School — Lima, Peru

=== D ===
- Division of Business (University of South Australia) — Adelaide, Australia
- Division of Management and Accountancy (Mexico Autonomous Institute of Technology) — Mexico City, Mexico
- Durham Business School (Durham University) — Durham, United Kingdom

=== E ===
- EADA Business School, Spain (3 years)
- EBS University of Business and Law — Oestrich-Winkel, Germany
- EDHEC - Business School, France
- EM Lyon, France
- ESADE Business School — Barcelona, Spain
- ESCEM School of Business and Management — Poitiers and Tours, France
- ESC Lille, France
- Escola de Administração de Empresas de São Paulo, Fundação Getulio Vargas (EAESP/FGV), Brazil
- ESCP Europe, Paris, France
- ESMT Berlin, Germany
- ESSCA, France
- ESSEC, France
- KEDGE Business School — France
- University of Exeter Business School — Exeter, United Kingdom

=== F ===
- Faculdad de Administración, University of the Andes, Colombia (3 years)
- Faculdade de Economia, Nova University Lisbon, Portugal (3 years)
- Faculté des Sciences de l'Administration, Université Laval, Canada (3 years)
- Faculty of Business Administration, Simon Fraser University, Canada (3 years)
- Faculty of Business Administration, Prague University of Economics and Business, Czech Republic (3 years)
- Faculty of Business and Economics, University of Hong Kong, Hong Kong (5 years)
- Faculty of Business and Economics, University of Lausanne, Switzerland
- Faculty of Business, City University of Hong Kong, Shek Kip Mei, Hong Kong (3 years)
- Faculty of Business, QUT - Queensland University of Technology, Brisbane, Australia (3 years)
- Faculty of Business, Hong Kong Polytechnic University, Hung Hom, Hong Kong (3 years)
- Faculty of Business Administration, University of Macau, Macau (3 years)
- Faculty of Business and Economics, University of Antwerp, Belgium (3 years)
- Faculty of Economics and Business, KU Leuven, Belgium (5 years)
- Faculty of Economics and Business Administration, Maastricht University, Netherlands (3 years)
- Faculty of Economics, Business Administration and IT, University of Zurich, Switzerland (3 years)
- Faculty of Economics, University of Ljubljana, Slovenia (3 years)
- Faculty of Management, Economics and Social Sciences, University of Cologne, Germany
- Faculty of Management, University of Warsaw, Poland
- Frankfurt School of Finance & Management, Germany
- Fundação Dom Cabral, Brazil (3 years)

=== G ===
- Graduate School of Business (Cape Town University) — Cape Town, South Africa
- Graduate School of Management (Saint Petersburg State University) - Saint Petersburg, Russia
- Goldman Academy — Lisbon, Portugal
- Gordon Institute of Business Science (University of Pretoria) - Johannesburg, South Africa
- Grenoble Graduate School of Business — Grenoble, France

=== H ===
- Hanken School of Economics — Helsinki, Finland
- HEC Lausanne (University of Lausanne) — Lausanne, Switzerland
- HEC Montréal (University of Montreal) — Montreal, Canada
- HEC Paris — Jouy-en-Josas, France
- Henley Business School (Reading University) — Reading, United Kingdom
- Hult International Business School — London, United Kingdom
- Hult International Business School — Boston, United States
- Hult International Business School — Cambridge, United States
- Hult International Business School — San Francisco, United States
- Hult International Business School — Dubai, United Arab Emirates

=== I ===
- IAE Universidad Austral — Buenos Aires, Argentina
- IAE, IAE Aix-en-Provence — France
- ICN Graduate Business School (University of Nancy) — Nancy, France
- IE Business School — Madrid, Spain
- IESA - Instituto de Estudios Superiores de Administración, Venezuela (3 years)
- IESE Business School, Spain (5 years)
- IESEG School of Management, France
- IMD -International Institute for Management Development — Lausanne, Switzerland (5 years)
- Imperial College Business School (Imperial College London) — London, United Kingdom
- INCAE Business School — Alajuela, Costa Rica and Panama City, Panama
- Indian Institute of Management Ahmedabad — Ahmedabad, India
- Indian Institute of Management Bangalore — Bangalore, India
- Indian Institute of Management Shillong — Shillong, India
- Indian Institute of Management Calcutta — Kolkata, India
- Indian Institute of Management Indore — Indore, India
- Indian Institute of Management Kozhikode — Kozhikode, India
- Indian School of Business — Hyderabad, India
- INSEAD — France and Singapore
- ISEG - Lisbon School of Economics and Management (Universidade de Lisboa), Portugal

=== J ===
- Jönköping International Business School (Jönköping University) — Jönköping, Sweden
- Judge Business School (Cambridge University) — Cambridge, United Kingdom

=== K ===
- Koç University Graduate School of Business (Koç University) — Istanbul, Turkey
- Korea University Business School (Korea University) — Seoul, South Korea
- Kozminski University — Warsaw, Poland
- KU Leuven's Faculty of Economics and Business (Katholieke Universiteit Leuven) - Leuven, Belgium

=== L ===
- Lancaster University Management School (Lancaster University) — Lancaster, United Kingdom
- Lee Kong Chian School of Business (Singapore Management University) — Singapore
- Leeds University Business School (Leeds University) — Leeds, United Kingdom
- London Business School (University of London) — London, United Kingdom
- Loughborough University Business School (Loughborough University) — Loughborough, United Kingdom
- Louvain School of Management (Louvain Catholic University) — Louvain-la-Neuve, Belgium
- LUISS Business School (LUISS University) — Rome, Italy
- Lund School of Economics and Management (Lund University) — Lund, Sweden

=== M ===
- Mannheim Business School (Mannheim University) — Mannheim, Germany
- Melbourne Business School — Melbourne, Australia
- Macquarie Graduate School of Management (Macquarie University) — Australia
- Miami Herbert Business School (University of Miami) — United States
- Michael G. Foster School of Business (University of Washington) — Seattle, United States
- POLIMI Graduate School of Management — Milan, Italy
- Monash Faculty of Business and Economics (Monash University) — Melbourne, Australia
- Moscow School of Management SKOLKOVO — Moscow, Russia
- Desautels Faculty of Management (McGill University) — Montreal, Canada

=== N ===
- Nanyang Business School (Nanyang Technological University) — Singapore
- School of Management (National Taiwan University of Science and Technology) — Taiwan (ROC)
- Norwegian School of Economics (NHH) — Bergen, Norway
- Nottingham University Business School — Nottingham, United Kingdom
- Nottingham Business School — Nottingham, United Kingdom
- Nyenrode Business University — Breukelen, Netherlands
- NUCB Business School — Nagoya, Japan
- Newcastle Business School, University of Newcastle, Australia — Newcastle, Australia

=== O ===
- Open University Business School, Open University — United Kingdom
- Otago Business School (Otago University) — New Zealand

=== P ===
- Peter B. Gustavson School of Business (University of Victoria) — Victoria, Canada
- Pontifical Catholic University of Chile's School of Administration (Pontifical Catholic University of Chile) — Santiago, Chile

=== Q ===
- Queen's Business School, (Queen's University Belfast) - Belfast, United Kingdom
- QUT Business School (Queensland University of Technology) — Brisbane, Australia
- Queen's School of Business (Queen's University) — Kingston, Canada
- Quinn School of Business (University College Dublin) — Dublin, Ireland

=== R ===
- Reims Management School — Reims, France
- Richard Ivey School of Business (Western Ontario University) — London, Canada
- Rotterdam School of Management, Erasmus University (Erasmus University Rotterdam) — Rotterdam, Netherlands
- Rouen Business School — Rouen, France

=== S ===
- Saïd Business School (University of Oxford) — Oxford, United Kingdom
- Sauder School of Business (British Columbia University) — Vancouver, Canada
- School of Business (Singapore National University) — Singapore
- School of Business Administration (Southwestern University of Finance and Economics) — Chengdu, China
- School of Business and Management (Hong Kong University of Science and Technology) — Hong Kong, Hong Kong
- School of Business, Economics and Law (University of Gothenburg) — Gothenburg, Sweden
- School of Economics and Business, University of Navarra, Spain
- School of Economics and Management (Tsinghua University) — Beijing, China
- School of Management (Fudan University) — Shanghai, China
- SDA Bocconi School of Management (Bocconi University) — Milan, Italy
- SGH Warsaw School of Economics — Warsaw, Poland
- Sheffield University Management School, University of Sheffield — Sheffield, United Kingdom
- Skema Business School — France (Lille, Paris, Nice/Sophia-Antipolis), United States (Raleigh), China (Suzhou); Brazil (Belo Horizonte)
- Solvay Brussels School of Economics and Management (Université Libre de Bruxelles) — Brussels, Belgium
- University of St. Gallen — St. Gallen, Switzerland
- University of Stellenbosch Business School (Stellenbosch University) — Stellenbosch, South Africa
- Stockholm School of Economics — Stockholm, Sweden
- Strathclyde Business School (Strathclyde University) — Glasgow, United Kingdom

=== T ===
- Monterrey Institute of Technology and Higher Education— Monterrey, Mexico
- Telfer School of Management (Ottawa University) — Ottawa, Canada
- Toulouse Business School — Toulouse, France
- Thammasat Business School — Bangkok, Thailand
- TUM School of Management — Munich, Germany
- Trinity College Dublin — Dublin, Ireland

=== U ===
- Université Paris-Dauphine — France
- University College Dublin — Ireland
- University of Cologne — Germany
- University of Edinburgh Business School (University of Edinburgh) — Edinburgh, United Kingdom
- University of Groningen, Faculty of Economics and Business — Netherlands
- University of Hamburg — Germany
- University of International Business and Economics — Beijing, China
- University of Liverpool Management School, University of Liverpool — Liverpool, United Kingdom
- University of Queensland Business School (Queensland University) — Brisbane, Australia
- University of Sydney Business School, University of Sydney, (5 years) — Australia

=== V ===
- Vienna University of Economics and Business — Vienna, Austria
- Vlerick Leuven Gent Management School (Ghent University and Leuven Catholic University) — Ghent and Leuven, Belgium

=== W ===
- Waikato Management School (Waikato University) — Hamilton, New Zealand
- Warwick Business School (Warwick University) — Coventry, United Kingdom
- University of Western Australia Business School (University of Western Australia) — Perth, Australia
- Victoria Business School (Victoria University of Wellington) — Wellington, New Zealand
- Westminster Business School (University of Westminster) — London, United Kingdom
- WHU – Otto Beisheim School of Management — Vallendar, Germany

== See also ==
- List of business schools in Europe
- Triple accreditation
