= List of AACSB-accredited schools (accounting) =

List of schools with accounting accreditation

Seal of AACSB accreditation

195 universities hold the Association to Advance Collegiate Schools of Business'(AACSB) Accounting Accreditation. Accounting accreditation is not to be confused with business school accreditation, which is held by 1,037 universities. The AACSB accredits business schools by evaluating critical areas of each school to ensure that it provides top-quality education, and schools can apply for the accounting accreditation, which focuses on the schools' accounting programs, in addition to business accreditation.

Accreditation is gained and maintained via a peer-review system, and schools are assessed in the context of their respective missions rather than against a fixed standard. To apply for accounting accreditation, a school is required either to already hold the business accreditation, or to apply for both the business and accounting accreditations at the same time.

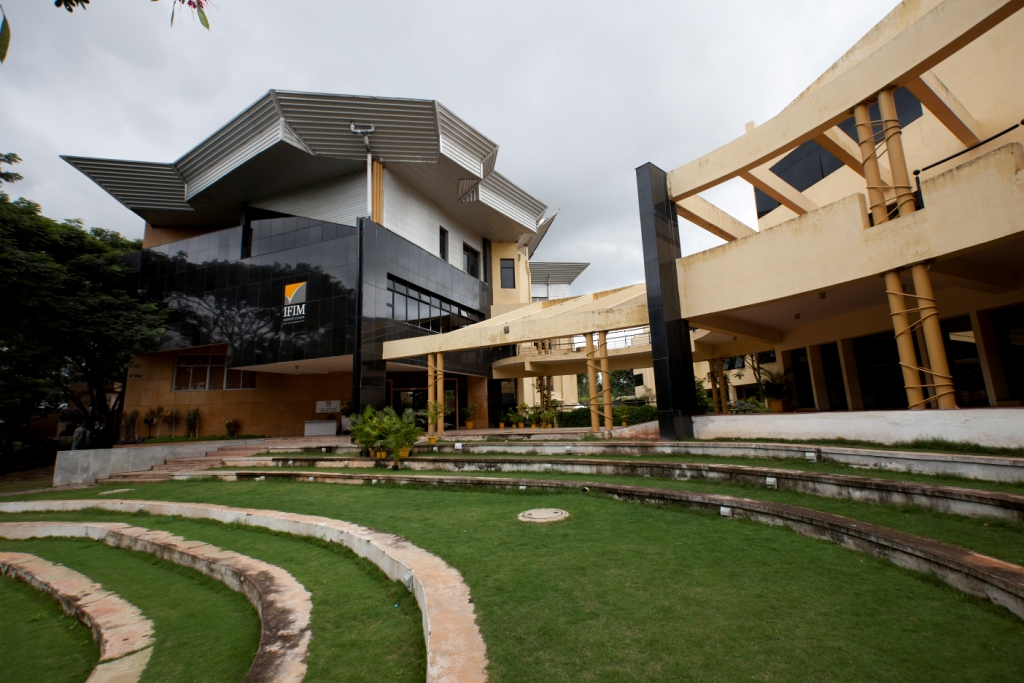
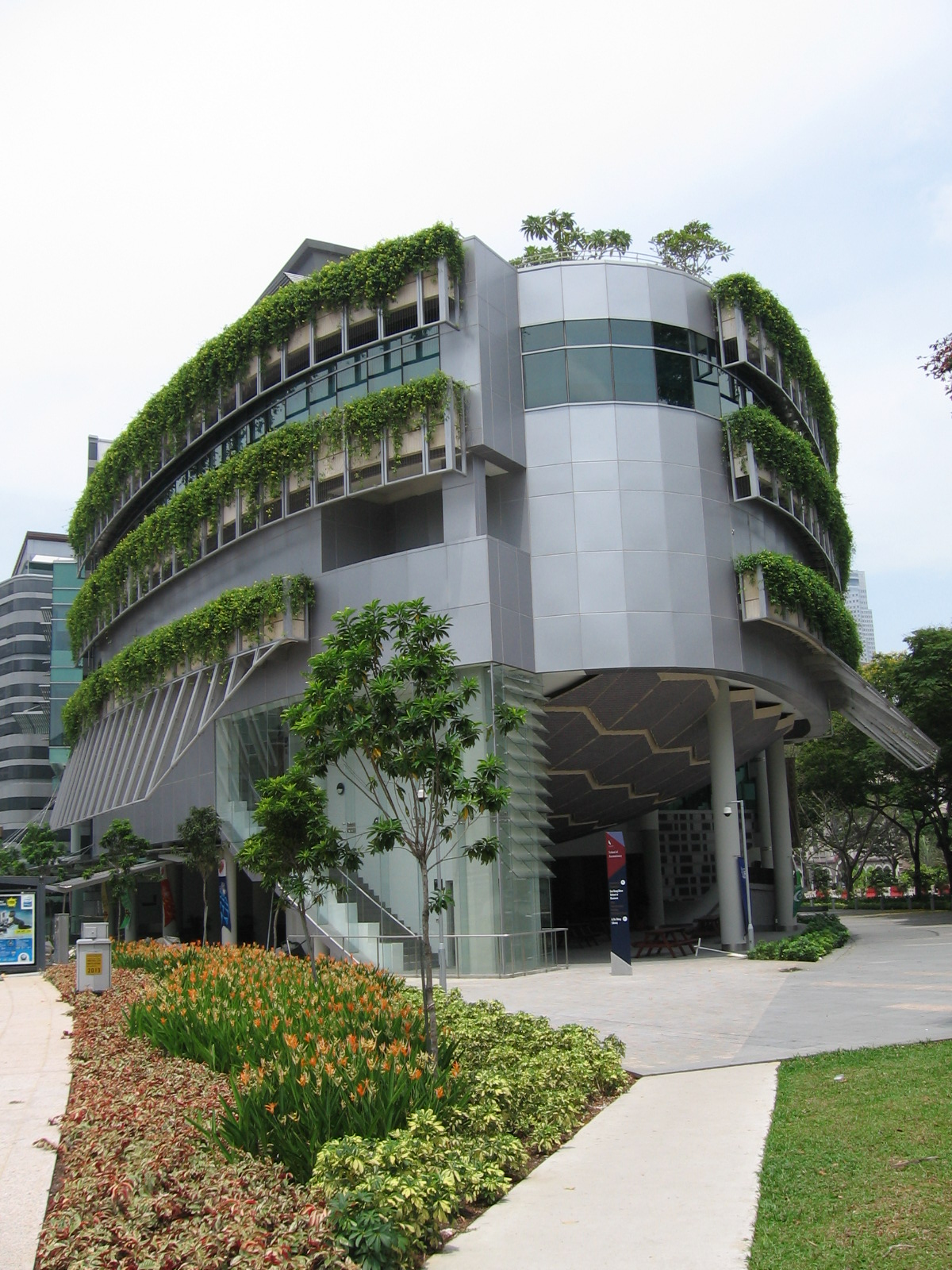
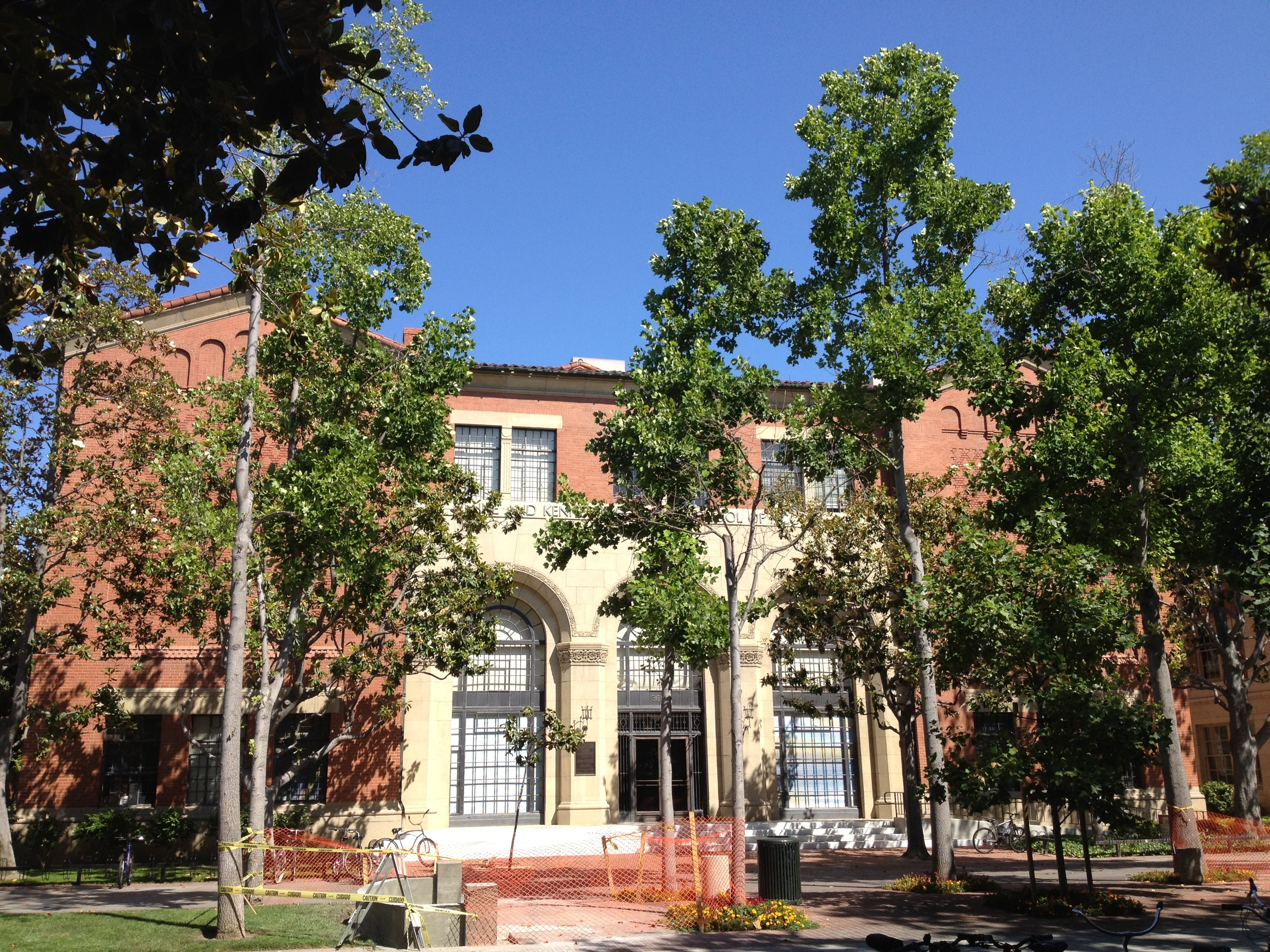
IFIM Business School campus in Bangalore (left), the School of Accountancy at Singapore Management University (middle), and Leventhal School of Accounting of the University of Southern California (right)

The initial accounting accreditation process starts with the submission of an eligibility application, and includes self-evaluations and peer reviews. The business school and the accounting academic unit are evaluated on their alignment with the AACSB's accreditation standards; under the standard for accounting accreditation, an accounting academic unit is evaluated based on its mission, intellectual contributions, and financial strategies for achieving its mission. For example, one of the bases of evaluation is whether the academic unit has produced intellectual contributions that have affected accounting, business and management "in ways that are consistent with the mission, expected outcomes, and strategies of the unit". Subsequently, the accounting accreditation is extended via 5-year review cycles.

As of 2013, the AACSB estimated that 5% of all business programs internationally, and most top business programs in the United States, held AACSB accreditation. AACSB accreditation is seen as a standard requirement in graduate business education, and universities are more likely to accept transfer credit earned from accredited schools; it has been called "the hallmark of excellence in business education".

== Schools ==
School	University	City	Country or region
University of Sydney Business School	University of Sydney	Sydney	Australia
Sydney Graduate School of Management	Western Sydney University	Sydney	Australia
UNSW Business School	University of New South Wales	Sydney	Australia
University of Newcastle's Newcastle Business School	University of Newcastle	Newcastle	Australia
University of Adelaide Business School	University of Adelaide	Adelaide	Australia
Faculty of Business and Economics	Monash University	Melbourne	Australia
Melbourne Business School	University of Melbourne	Melbourne	Australia
HEC ULiège	University of Liège	Liège	Belgium
Faculty of Economics and Business Administration	University of Ghent	Ghent	Belgium
Faculty of Business Economics	Hasselt University	Hasselt	Belgium
Faculty of Business and Economics & Antwerp Management School	University of Antwerp	Antwerp	Belgium
Saint Mary's University	Saint Mary's University	Halifax	Canada
Tsinghua University School of Economics and Management	Tsinghua University	Beijing	China
Audencia Business School	Conférence des Grandes écoles	Nantes	France
Brest Business School	Conférence des Grandes écoles	Brest	France
Burgundy School of Business	Conférence des Grandes écoles	Dijon, Lyon, Paris	France
EDHEC Business School	Conférence des Grandes écoles	Lille, Nice, Paris	France
EM Lyon Business School	Conférence des Grandes écoles	Lyon, Paris	France
EM Normandie	Conférence des Grandes écoles	Caen, Le Havre, Paris	France
EM Strasbourg Business School	Conférence des Grandes écoles	Strasbourg	France
ESC Clermont Graduate School of Management	Conférence des Grandes écoles	Clermont-Ferrand	France
ESC Rennes School of Business	Conférence des Grandes écoles	Rennes	France
ESCP Europe	Conférence des Grandes écoles	Paris, Madrid, Turin, London, Berlin, Warsaw	France
ESDES School of Business and Management	Conférence des Grandes écoles	Lyon	France
ESSCA	Conférence des Grandes écoles	Angers	France
ESSEC Business School	Conférence des Grandes écoles	Paris	France
Grenoble école de management	Conférence des Grandes écoles	Grenoble	France
HEC Paris	Conférence des Grandes écoles	Paris	France
ICN Business School	Conférence des Grandes écoles	Nancy, Paris	France
INSEAD	Conférence des Grandes écoles	Fontainebleau	France
Institut Mines-Télécom Business School	Conférence des Grandes écoles	Évry-Courcouronnes	France
IÉSEG School of Management	Conférence des Grandes écoles	Lille, Paris	France
ISC Paris School of Management	Conférence des Grandes écoles	Paris	France
KEDGE Business School	Conférence des Grandes écoles	Marseille, Bordeaux	France
Montpellier Business School	Conférence des Grandes écoles	Montpellier	France
NEOMA Business School	Conférence des Grandes écoles	Reims, Rouen	France
Normandy Business School	Conférence des Grandes écoles	Caen	France
TBS Education	Conférence des Grandes écoles	Toulouse, Barcelona, Paris, Casablanca	France
Faculty of Business Administration	Chinese University of Hong Kong	Hong Kong	Hong Kong
HKUST Business School	Hong Kong University of Science and Technology	Hong Kong	Hong Kong
Faculty of Business and Economics	University of Hong Kong	Hong Kong	Hong Kong
Corvinus University of Budapest	Corvinus University of Budapest	Budapest	Hungary
Indian Institute of Foreign Trade	Indian Institute of Foreign Trade	Delhi	India
Management Development Institute (MDI) Gurgaon	Management Development Institute	Gurugram	India
IMT Ghaziabad	IMT Ghaziabad	Ghaziabad	India
Amrita School of Business	Amrita Vishwa Vidyapeetham	Coimbatore	India
Bennett University	Bennett University	Greater Noida	India
SBM - NMIMS	SVKM's NMIMS	Mumbai	India
Symbiosis Centre for Management & Human Resource Development (SCMHRD)	Symbiosis International University	Pune	India
Jagdish Sheth School of Management (Formerly IFIM Business School)	Jagdish Sheth School of Management	Bangalore	India
XLRI - Xavier School of Management	XLRI - Xavier School of Management	Jamshedpur	India
Indian School of Business	Indian School of Business	Hyderabad	India
T.A. Pai Management Institute (TAPMI)	TAPMI	Manipal	India
Faculty of Economics and Business	University of Indonesia	Depok	Indonesia
BINUS Business School	BINUS University	Jakarta	Indonesia
Olayan School of Business	American University of Beirut	Beirut	Lebanon
Adnan Kassar School of Business	Lebanese American University	Beirut	Lebanon
College of Commerce	Victoria University of Wellington	Wellington	New Zealand
Lahore University of Management Sciences	Lahore University of Management Sciences	Lahore	Pakistan
Graduate School of Management	St Petersburg University	St Petersburg	Russia
Nanyang Business School	Nanyang Technological University	Singapore	Singapore
SMU School of Accountancy	Singapore Management University	Singapore	Singapore
SolBridge International School of Business	Woosong University	Daejeon	South Korea
NCCU College of Commerce	National Chengchi University	Taipei	Taiwan
Faculty of Business Administration	Istanbul University	Istanbul	Turkey
Faculty of Business Administration	Bilkent University	Ankara	Turkey
Sabancı Business School	Sabancı University	Istanbul	Turkey
College of Administrative Sciences and Economics	Koç University	Istanbul	Turkey
Sakarya Business School	Sakarya University	Sakarya	Turkey
Faculty of Business	Dokuz Eylul University	Izmir	Turkey
Faculty of Business Administration	Ozyegin University	Istanbul	Turkey
College of Business and Economics	United Arab Emirates University	Al-Ain	United Arab Emirates
Saïd Business School	University of Oxford	Oxford	United Kingdom
Nottingham Business School	Nottingham Trent University	Nottingham	United Kingdom
Nottingham University Business School	University of Nottingham	Nottingham	United Kingdom
Aston Business School	Aston University	Birmingham	United Kingdom
Birmingham Business School	University of Birmingham	Birmingham	United Kingdom
Newcastle Business School	Northumbria University	Newcastle upon Tyne	United Kingdom
Newcastle University Business School	Newcastle University	Newcastle upon Tyne	United Kingdom
Liverpool Hope Business School	Liverpool Hope University	Liverpool	United Kingdom
Liverpool Business School	Liverpool John Moores University	Liverpool	United Kingdom
University of Liverpool Management School	University of Liverpool	Liverpool	United Kingdom
Cardiff Business School	Cardiff University	Cardiff	United Kingdom
Raymond J. Harbert College of Business	Auburn University	Auburn	United States
The College of Business	Louisiana State University Shreveport	Shreveport, Louisiana	United States
School of Business	Auburn University Montgomery	Montgomery	United States
Culverhouse College of Commerce and Business Administration	University of Alabama	Tuscaloosa	United States
Collat School of Business	University of Alabama at Birmingham	Birmingham	United States
Mitchell College of Business	University of South Alabama	Mobile, Alabama	United States
School of Management	University of Alaska Fairbanks	Fairbanks	United States
W. P. Carey School of Business	Arizona State University	Arizona	United States
W.A. Franke College of Business	Northern Arizona University	Flagstaff	United States
Eller College of Management	University of Arizona	Tucson	United States
Sam M. Walton College of Business	University of Arkansas	Fayetteville	United States
College of Business and Economics	California State University, Fullerton	Fullerton	United States
College of Business Administration	California State University, Sacramento	Sacramento	United States
College of Business Administration	San Diego State University	San Diego	United States
SCU Leavey School of Business	Santa Clara University	Santa Clara	United States
School of Business Administration	University of San Diego	San Diego	United States
USC Marshall School of Business	University of Southern California	Los Angeles	United States
Business School	University of Colorado Denver	Denver	United States
Daniels College of Business	University of Denver	Denver	United States
Monfort College of Business	University of Northern Colorado	Greeley	United States
School of Business	University of Connecticut	Storrs	United States
School of Business	Quinnipiac University	Hamden, Connecticut	United States
Alfred Lerner College of Business and Economics, The University of Delaware	University of Delaware	Newark	United States
School of Business	Howard University	Washington, D.C.	United States
School of Business	George Washington University	Washington, D.C.	United States
College of Business	Florida Atlantic University	Boca Raton	United States
College of Business	Florida International University	Miami	United States
Andreas School of Business	Barry University	Miami Shores	United States
Lutgert College of Business	Florida Gulf Coast University	Fort Myers	United States
College of Business	Florida State University	Tallahassee	United States
School of Business Administration	Stetson University	DeLand	United States
College of Business Administration	University of Central Florida	Orlando	United States
College of Business	University of West Florida	Pensacola	United States
Warrington College of Business	University of Florida	Gainesville	United States
School of Business Administration	University of Miami	Miami	United States
Coggin College of Business	University of North Florida	Jacksonville	United States
Muma College of Business	University of South Florida	Tampa	United States
College of Business	University of South Florida St. Petersburg	St. Petersburg	United States
College of Business Administration	Georgia Southern University	Statesboro	United States
J. Mack Robinson College of Business	Georgia State University	Atlanta	United States
Coles College of Business	Kennesaw State University	Kennesaw	United States
Terry College of Business	University of Georgia	Athens	United States
Richards College of Business	University of West Georgia	Carrollton	United States
College of Business and Economics	Boise State University	Boise	United States
College of Business	Idaho State University	Pocatello	United States
College of Business and Economics	University of Idaho	Moscow	United States
Foster College of Business Administration	Bradley University	Peoria	United States
Richard H. Driehaus College of Business	DePaul University	Chicago	United States
Lumpkin College of Business and Applied Sciences	Eastern Illinois University	Charleston	United States
College of Business	Illinois State University	Normal	United States
Quinlan School of Business	Loyola University Chicago	Chicago	United States
College of Business	Northern Illinois University	DeKalb	United States
College of Business	Southern Illinois University Carbondale	Carbondale	United States
School of Business	Southern Illinois University Edwardsville	Edwardsville	United States
College of Business Administration	University of Illinois at Chicago	Chicago	United States
Gies College of Business	University of Illinois at Urbana-Champaign	Urbana; Champaign	United States
College of Business and Management	University of Illinois Springfield	Springfield	United States
College of Business and Technology	Western Illinois University	Macomb	United States
Miller College of Business	Ball State University	Indiana	United States
Kelley School of Business	Indiana University Bloomington	Indiana	United States
Mendoza College of Business	University of Notre Dame	Indiana	United States
Romain College of Business	University of Southern Indiana	Indiana	United States
Mitch Daniels School of Business	Purdue University	Indiana	United States
College of Business and Public Administration	Drake University	Iowa	United States
College of Business	Iowa State University	Iowa	United States
Tippie College of Business	University of Iowa	Iowa	United States
College of Business Administration	Kansas State University	Kansas	United States
School of Business	University of Kansas	Kansas	United States
W. Frank Barton School of Business	Wichita State University	Kansas	United States
Carol Martin Gatton College of Business and Economics	University of Kentucky	Kentucky	United States
Arthur J. Bauernfeind College of Business	Murray State University	Kentucky	United States
College of Business	University of Louisville	Kentucky	United States
Gordon Ford College of Business	Western Kentucky University	Kentucky	United States
College of Business	Louisiana Tech University	Louisiana	United States
College of Business Administration	Nicholls State University	Louisiana	United States
College of Business	Southeastern Louisiana University	Louisiana	United States
B. I. Moody, III College of Business Administration	University of Louisiana at Lafayette	Louisiana	United States
College of Business Administration	University of Louisiana at Monroe	Louisiana	United States
College of Business Administration	Loyola University of New Orleans	Louisiana	United States
Sellinger School of Business and Management	Loyola University Maryland	Maryland	United States
Earl G. Graves School of Business and Management	Morgan State University	Maryland	United States
College of Business and Economics	Towson University	Maryland	United States
Bentley Business School	Bentley University	Massachusetts	United States
Sawyer Business School	Suffolk University	Massachusetts	United States
Isenberg School of Management	University of Massachusetts Amherst	Massachusetts	United States
Charlton College of Business	University of Massachusetts Dartmouth	Massachusetts	United States
College of Business Administration	Central Michigan University	Michigan	United States
Seidman College of Business	Grand Valley State University	Michigan	United States
Eli Broad College of Business	Michigan State University	Michigan	United States
College of Business	Michigan Technological University	Michigan	United States
School of Business Administration	Oakland University	Michigan	United States
Haworth College of Business	Western Michigan University	Michigan	United States
College of Business	Mississippi State University	Mississippi	United States
School of Business Administration	University of Mississippi	Mississippi	United States
College of Business	University of Southern Mississippi	Mississippi	United States
Trulaske College of Business	University of Missouri	Columbia, Missouri	United States
School of Business	Truman State University	Kirksville, Missouri	United States
School of Business	Missouri University of Science and Technology	Rolla, Missouri	United States
College of Business Administration	Missouri State University	Springfield, Missouri	United States
College of Business Administration	University of Missouri-St. Louis	St Louis, Missouri	United States
Helzberg School of Management	Rockhurst University	Kansas City, Missouri	United States
Harmon College of Business and Professional Studies	University of Central Missouri	Warrensburg, Missouri	United States
School of Business Administration	University of Montana	Montana	United States
College of Business Administration	Creighton University	Nebraska	United States
College of Business Administration	University of Nebraska Omaha	Nebraska	United States
College of Business Administration	University of Nebraska–Lincoln	Nebraska	United States
Lee Business School	University of Nevada, Las Vegas	Nevada	United States
College of Business Administration	University of Nevada, Reno	Reno	United States
Cotsakos College of Business	William Paterson University	Wayne	United States
Silberman College of Business	Fairleigh Dickinson University	Teaneck	United States
College of Business Administration	Rider University	New Jersey	United States
Stillman School of Business	Seton Hall University	East Orange	United States
Martin Tuchman School of Management	New Jersey Institute of Technology	Newark	United States
Rutgers Business School	Rutgers, The State University of New Jersey	New Brunswick	United States
College of Business	New Mexico State University	New Mexico	United States
Anderson School of Management	University of New Mexico	New Mexico	United States
Zicklin School of Business	Baruch College of City University of New York	New York City	United States
Murray Koppelman School of Business	Brooklyn College of City University of New York	New York City Borough of Brooklyn	United States
Frank G. Zarb School of Business	Hofstra University	Hempstead	United States
Lubin School of Business	Pace University	New York City	United States
Saunders College of Business	Rochester Institute of Technology	Rochester	United States
Peter J. Tobin College of Business	St. John's University	New York City	United States
School of Business	University at Albany, State University of New York	Albany	United States
School of Management	University at Buffalo, State University of New York	Buffalo	United States
College of Business	East Carolina University	North Carolina	United States
School of Business and Economics	North Carolina A&T State University	North Carolina	United States
Poole College of Management	North Carolina State University	North Carolina	United States
Belk College of Business	University of North Carolina at Charlotte	North Carolina	United States
Broadwell College of Business and Economics	University of North Carolina at Fayetteville	North Carolina	United States
Joseph M. Bryan School of Business and Economics	University of North Carolina at Greensboro	North Carolina	United States
Schools of Business	Wake Forest University	North Carolina	United States
College of Business Administration	Bowling Green State University	Ohio	United States
Weatherhead School of Management	Case Western Reserve University	Ohio	United States
Monte Ahuja College of Business	Cleveland State University	Ohio	United States
John M. and Mary Jo Boler School of Business	John Carroll University	Ohio	United States
College of Business Administration & Graduate School of Management	Kent State University	Ohio	United States
Farmer School of Business	Miami University	Ohio	United States
Max M. Fisher College of Business	Ohio State University	Ohio	United States
College of Business	Ohio University	Ohio	United States
College of Business Administration & School of Accountancy	University of Akron	Ohio	United States
School of Business Administration	University of Dayton	Ohio	United States
Raj Soin College of Business	Wright State University	Ohio	United States
Williamson College of Business Administration	Youngstown State University	Ohio	United States
Spears School of Business	Oklahoma State University	Oklahoma	United States
Michael F. Price College of Business	University of Oklahoma	Oklahoma	United States
College of Business	Oregon State University	Oregon	United States
School of Business Administration	Portland State University	Oregon	United States
Lundquist College of Business	University of Oregon	Oregon	United States
William G. McGowan School of Business	King's College (Pennsylvania)	Pennsylvania	United States
College of Business and Economics	Lehigh University	Pennsylvania	United States
Erivan K. Haub School of Business	Saint Joseph's University	Pennsylvania	United States
Fox School of Business	Temple University	Pennsylvania	United States
Villanova School of Business	Villanova University	Pennsylvania	United States
The Arthur J. Kania School of Management	University of Scranton	Pennsylvania	United States
College of Business Administration	University of Rhode Island	Rhode Island	United States
College of Business and Behavioral Science	Clemson University	South Carolina	United States
School of Business	College of Charleston	South Carolina	United States
Darla Moore School of Business	University of South Carolina	South Carolina	United States
College of Business Administration	Belmont University	Tennessee	United States
College of Business and Technology	East Tennessee State University	Tennessee	United States
Jennings A. Jones College of Business	Middle Tennessee State University	Tennessee	United States
College of Business	Tennessee Technological University	Tennessee	United States
Fogelman College of Business and Economics	University of Memphis	Tennessee	United States
College of Business Administration	University of Tennessee at Chattanooga	Tennessee	United States
College of Business Administration	University of Tennessee at Knoxville	Tennessee	United States
Hankamer School of Business	Baylor University	Texas	United States
Mays Business School	Texas A&M University	Texas	United States
College of Business	Texas A&M University–Corpus Christi	Texas	United States
Neeley School of Business	Texas Christian University	Texas	United States
McCoy College of Business	Texas State University	Texas	United States
Rawls College of Business	Texas Tech University	Texas	United States
C.T. Bauer College of Business	University of Houston	Texas	United States
College of Business	University of Houston–Clear Lake	Texas	United States
College of Business	University of North Texas	Texas	United States
College of Business	University of Texas at Arlington	Texas	United States
McCombs School of Business	University of Texas at Austin	Texas	United States
Naveen Jindal School of Management	University of Texas at Dallas	Texas	United States
College of Business Administration	University of Texas at El Paso	Texas	United States
College of Business	University of Texas at San Antonio	Texas	United States
College of Business	West Texas A&M	Texas	United States
Marriott School of Management	Brigham Young University	Utah	United States
David Eccles School of Business	University of Utah	Utah	United States
Jon M. Huntsman School of Business	Utah State University	Utah	United States
John B. Goddard School of Business & Economics	Weber State University	Utah	United States
Mason School of Business	College of William and Mary	Virginia	United States
Donald G. Costello College of Business	George Mason University	Virginia	United States
College of Business	James Madison University	Virginia	United States
College of Business and Public Administration	Old Dominion University	Virginia	United States
E. Claiborne Robins School of Business	University of Richmond	Virginia	United States
McIntire School of Commerce	University of Virginia	Virginia	United States
School of Business	Virginia Commonwealth University	Virginia	United States
Pamplin College of Business	Virginia Polytechnic Institute and State University	Virginia	United States
School of Business Administration	Gonzaga University	Washington	United States
Foster School of Business	University of Washington	Washington	United States
Carson College of Business	Washington State University	Washington	United States
Elizabeth McDowell Lewis College of Business	Marshall University	West Virginia	United States
College of Business and Economics	West Virginia University	West Virginia	United States
College of Business Administration & Graduate School of Management	Marquette University	Milwaukee	United States
College of Business and Economics	University of Wisconsin-Whitewater	Whitewater	United States
Wisconsin School of Business	University of Wisconsin-Madison	Madison	United States
Sheldon B. Lubar School of Business	University of Wisconsin-Milwaukee	Milwaukee	United States
College of Business and Management	Northeastern Illinois University	Chicago	United States
Scott College of Business	Indiana State University	Terre Haute	United States
College of Business & Economics	California State University, Los Angeles	Los Angeles	United States
D. Abbott Turner College of Business	Columbus State University	Columbus	United States
Carey Business School	Johns Hopkins University	Baltimore, MD	United States
Hult International Business School	Hult International Business School	Cambridge, San Francisco; Boston; London; Dubai	United States; United Kingdom; United Arab Emirates
Institut catholique des hautes études commerciales	Haute École ICHEC - ECAM - ISFSC	Brussels	Belgium
K J Somaiya Institute of Management Studies & Research	K J Somaiya Institute of Management Studies & Research	Mumbai	India
Rajagiri Business School	Rajagiri Business School	Kochi	India
International University of Japan	International University of Japan	Niigata	Japan
Keio University	Keio University	Yokohama	Japan
Nagoya University of Commerce and Business	Nagoya University of Commerce and Business	Nagoya	Japan
Ritsumeikan Asia Pacific University	Ritsumeikan Asia Pacific University	Beppu	Japan
Hitotsubashi University	Hitotsubashi University	Tokyo	Japan
Waseda University	Waseda University	Tokyo	Japan

== See also ==
- Regional accreditation
- Triple accreditation
