= Eliot Hall and May Hall =

Buildings in the University of Hong Kong

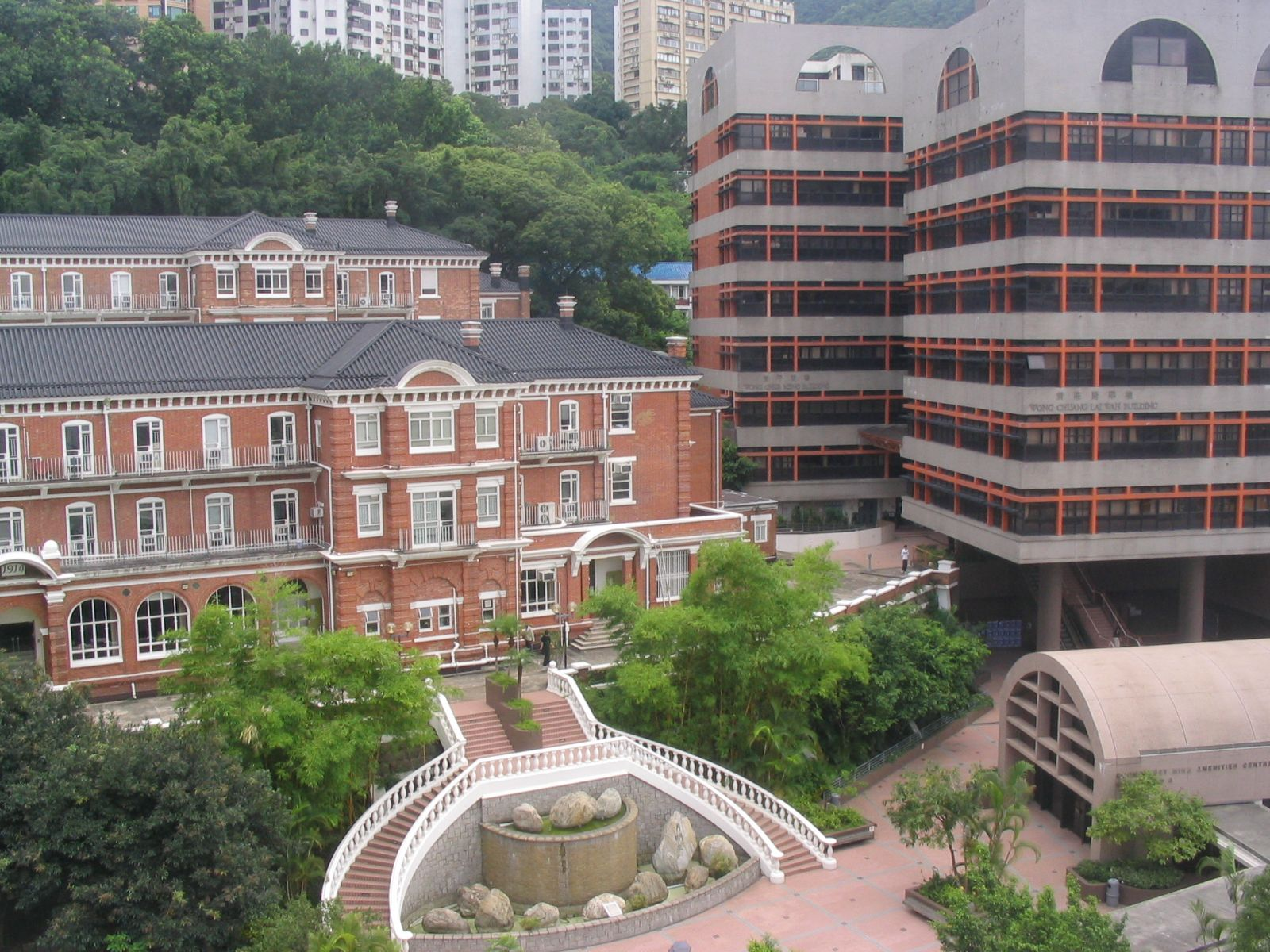
Exterior view of the two halls

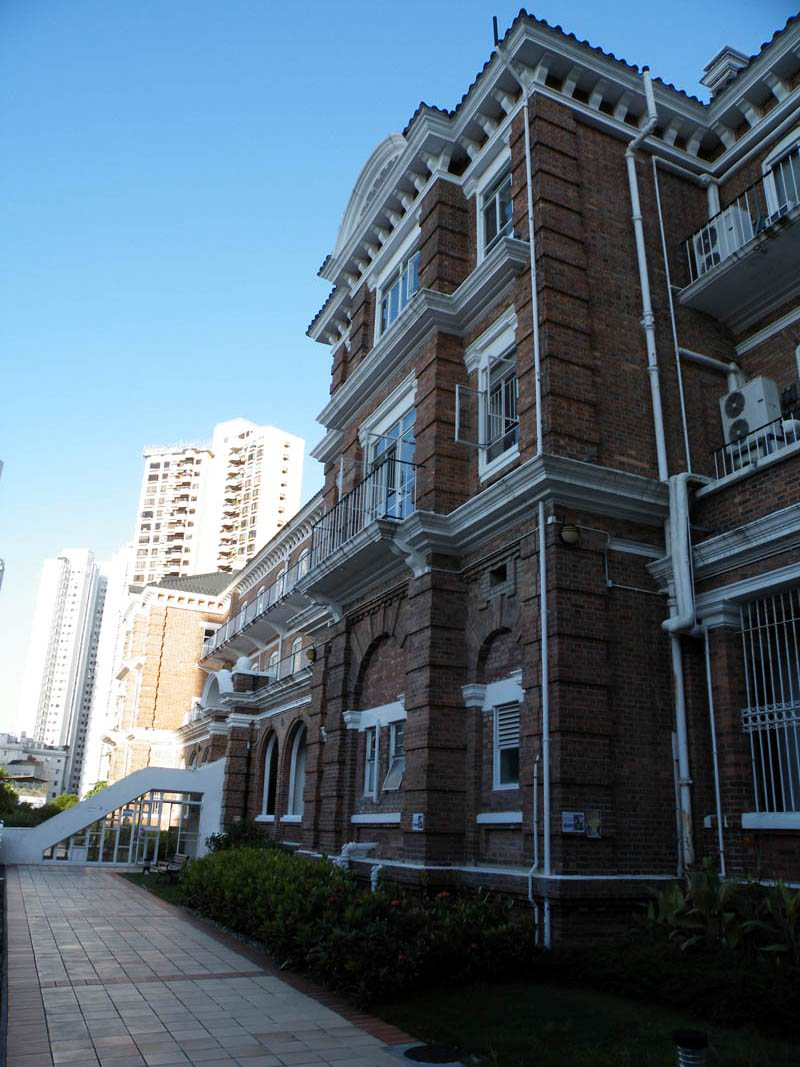
May Hall

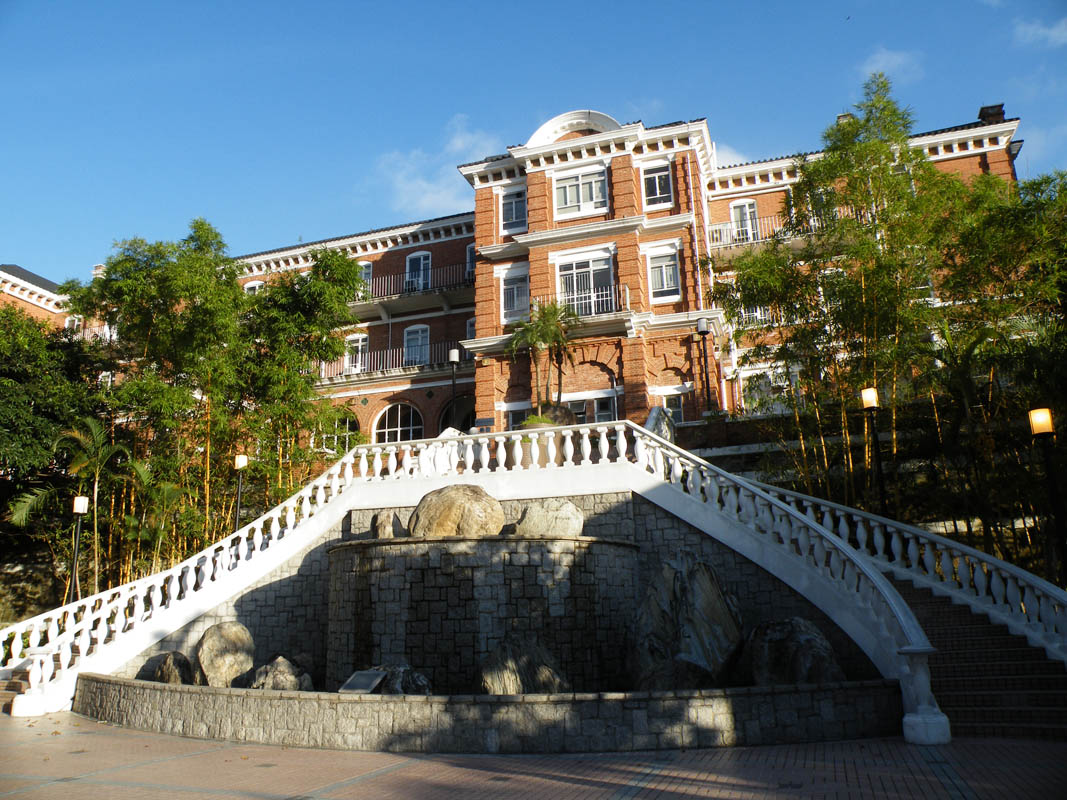
Front view of Eliot Hall

Eliot Hall (Chinese: 儀禮堂) and May Hall (Chinese: 梅堂) are both buildings located in the University of Hong Kong. The two halls are declared monuments of Hong Kong and were built in the Edwardian architectural style modelled after the even older pre-existing Lugard Hall. They were both designed by local Hong Kong architects, Denison, Ram and Gibbs. The two halls were opened in 1914 and 1915 respectively.

The two halls formed the "Old Hall" in 1966 along with Lugard Hall, but were later reverted to the previous status as separate halls upon the demolishment of the Lugard Hall in 1992.

The exterior of the two halls were declared as historical monuments in 2018. The two halls now serve as the university's offices with the interior being off-limits to visitors.

== History ==
Eliot Hall was opened in 1914 as the university's second residential hall and was named after Sir Charles Eliot, the first vice-chancellor of the university. It was used as a relief hospital during the Second World War as additional support for the nearby Queen Mary Hospital. The hall was later converted to a gymnasium in 1956 and returned to being a male student residential hall in 1963.

May Hall was opened in 1915 as the university's third residential hall and was named after Sir Francis Henry May, the second chancellor of the university and the 15th governor of Hong Kong. It was used as the main residence for the university's staff and students, especially overseas students during the Second World War as Lugard Hall and Eliot Hall were both used as relief hospitals.

In 1966, a massive landslide occurred nearby and destroyed parts of the two halls. The university after making partial demolishment and repairment to the both, decided in 1969 to merge Eliot Hall, May Hall and the already existing Lugard Hall to form one large residential unit named the "Old Halls" (明原堂), accommodating approximately 200 students, with the three halls now being "wings" of this new hall. Female students, previously not accommodated in the three halls, were then being accommodated in this new hall. The three halls were also made to be connected by covered stairways. In 1992, the Lugard Wing was demolished, which both the Eliot Wing and May Wing reverted to their old names and became separate entities.

The exterior of the two halls were declared as historical monuments in 2018. The two halls now serve as the university's offices, with the interior being off-limits to visitors.

== Architecture ==
Both halls were designed by local Hong Kong Architects, Denison, Ram and Gibbs in the Edwardian architectural style. Both halls feature curved pediments over the entrance doorways, rusticated columns, Doric capitals, window sills, cornices, Chinese-style ceramic grilles, and balconies with balustrades. Pitched and double-tiled Chinese roofs were also featured for both halls, which were local adaptations to the two buildings.

== Lugard Hall ==
Lugard Hall (Chinese: 盧吉堂) was opened in 1913 as the university's first residential hall. It was named after Sir Frederick Lugard, the first chancellor of the university and the 14th governor of Hong Kong. The design of Eliot Hall and May Hall was modelled from Lugard Hall, which all three halls shared the same architectural style and exterior look. Lugard Hall was used as a relief hospital during the Second World War alongside Eliot Hall. Lugard Hall was demolished in 1992 for campus development.
