= University of Hong Kong Faculty of Business and Economics =

Business school of the University of Hong Kong

Faculty of Business and Economics, The University of Hong Kong
- 香港大學經濟及工商管理學院
- Other name: HKU Business School
- Type: Faculty
- Established: 2001; 25 years ago
- Parent institution: University of Hong Kong
- Accreditation: AACSB; EQUIS
- Dean: Hongbin Cai
- Location: K.K. Leung Building, The University of Hong Kong, Pok Fu Lam, Hong Kong
- Website: www.hkubs.hku.hk

The Faculty of Business and Economics of the University of Hong Kong (Chinese: 香港大學經濟及工商管理學院), branded as HKU Business School (Chinese: 港大經管學院), is the business and economics faculty of the University of Hong Kong (HKU). It was established in 2001 through the amalgamation of the university's School of Business and School of Economics and Finance.

The school offers undergraduate and postgraduate programmes in accounting, business administration, economics, finance, management, marketing and related disciplines. Its dean is economist Hongbin Cai, who has held the position since July 2017.

The school has been accredited by the EFMD Quality Improvement System (EQUIS) since 2004 and by the Association to Advance Collegiate Schools of Business (AACSB) since 2010.

== History ==
The Faculty of Business and Economics was established in 2001 through the amalgamation of the School of Business and the School of Economics and Finance.

The faculty received EQUIS accreditation in June 2004. In 2008, it opened facilities at Cyberport for executive and postgraduate education. It received AACSB accreditation in business and accounting in 2010.

In 2013, the faculty and School of Business relocated to the renovated K.K. Leung Building, bringing them together with the School of Economics and Finance.

=== 2024 admissions fraud investigation ===
In May 2024, HKU Business School announced that it had identified cases in which fraudulent academic documents had been submitted in applications for admission to its postgraduate programmes. The school said that some cases involved education agencies offering purported "guaranteed admission" services and that suspected cases would be referred to law-enforcement authorities.

By July 2024, the school said that more than 30 master's students had been found to have used fraudulent qualifications to obtain admission. Cai said that the number of cases identified could ultimately reach between 80 and 100.

The discovery prompted wider scrutiny of university admissions procedures in Hong Kong.

== Academic programmes ==
=== Undergraduate programmes ===
The school offers undergraduate programmes in business, economics, finance and related disciplines.

The undergraduate degree programmes include:

- Bachelor of Global Leadership, Innovation and Society
- Bachelor of Business Administration
- Bachelor of Business Administration in Accounting and Finance
- Bachelor of Business Administration in Accounting Data Analytics
- Bachelor of Business Administration in Business Analytics
- Bachelor of Business Administration in International Business and Global Management
- Bachelor of Business Administration in Information Systems
- Bachelor of Business Administration (Law) and Bachelor of Laws
- Bachelor of Economics
- Bachelor of Economics and Finance
- Bachelor of Finance in Asset Management and Private Banking
- Bachelor of Science in Marketing Analytics and Technology
- Bachelor of Science in Quantitative Finance

The Bachelor of Business Administration (Law) and Bachelor of Laws is a double-degree programme offered jointly with the Faculty of Law.

=== Taught postgraduate programmes ===
The school's specialist taught postgraduate programmes include:

- Master of Accounting
- Master of Accounting Analytics
- Master of Artificial Intelligence in Business
- Master of Economics
- Master of Family Wealth Management
- Master of Finance
- Master of Finance in Financial Technology
- Master of Global Management
- Master of Science in Business Analytics
- Master of Science in Marketing
- Master of Sustainable Accounting and Finance
- Master of Wealth Management

=== MBA and executive programmes ===
The school offers a Master of Business Administration (MBA), an International MBA and an Executive MBA.

The International MBA is offered in collaboration with the School of Management of Fudan University, with teaching primarily conducted in Shanghai.

The school also offers a Doctor of Business Administration (DBA).

=== Research degrees ===
The school offers research programmes leading to the degrees of Master of Philosophy (MPhil) and Doctor of Philosophy (PhD).

== Accreditation ==
HKU Business School has held EQUIS accreditation since June 2004. EQUIS is administered by EFMD Global.

The school has held AACSB accreditation since April 2010. AACSB lists the University of Hong Kong as an accredited institution.

== See also ==
- University of Hong Kong
- List of EQUIS accredited institutions
- List of AACSB-accredited schools
- HKUST Business School
