= University of Hong Kong =

Public university in Pokfulam, Hong Kong

The University of Hong Kong
- 香港大學
- Coat of arms
- Motto: Sapientia et Virtus (Latin) 明德格物 (Classical Chinese)
- Motto in English: Wisdom and Virtue
- Type: Public
- Established: 1 October 1887; 139 years ago (as Hong Kong College of Medicine for Chinese); 30 March 1911; 115 years ago (as the University of Hong Kong)
- Affiliations: ACU; Heads of Universities Committee; JQRC; JUPAS; MISA; UGC
- Academic affiliations: ASAIHL; APRU; BHUA; GHMUA; Universitas 21
- Chancellor: John Lee Ka-chiu
- President: Xiang Zhang
- Vice-president: Gong Peng; Ian Holliday; Max Shen
- Provost: Richard Wong
- Pro-chancellor: David Li
- Academic staff: 9,288 (2023)
- Administrative staff: 4,427 (2023)
- Students: 39,166 (2023)
- Undergraduates: 18,491 (47.2%) (2023)
- Postgraduates: 20,675 (52.8%) (2023)
- Location: Pokfulam, Hong Kong; 22°17′03″N 114°08′16″E
- Campus: 17.7 hectares (0.177 km^{2}) (Main campus) 70.1 hectares (0.701 km^{2}) (Total); Urban
- Newspaper: Undergrad HKUSU (Chinese)
- Colours: Dark green
- Mascot: Lion
- Website: hku.hk

Chinese name
- Simplified Chinese: 香港大学
- Traditional Chinese: 香港大學
Transcriptions
Standard Mandarin
- Hanyu Pinyin: Xiānggǎng Dàxué
- Bopomofo: ㄒㄧㄤ ㄍㄤˇ ㄉㄚˋ ㄒㄩㄝˊ
- Wade–Giles: Hsiang^{1}-kang^{3} Ta^{4}-hsüeh^{2}
- IPA: [ɕjáŋ.kàŋ tâ.ɕɥě]
Wu
- Wugniu: shian^{1} kaon^{3} da^{6} ghoq^{8}
- IPA: Shanghainese: [ɕiã˥ kɑ̃˧ da˨ ɦoʔ˧]
Yue: Cantonese
- Yale Romanization: Hēunggóng Daaihhohk
- Jyutping: hoeng^{1} gong^{2} daai^{6} hok^{6}
- IPA: [hœŋ˥.kɔŋ˧˥ taj˨.hɔk̚˨]

The University of Hong Kong (HKU) is a public university in Pokfulam, Hong Kong. It was founded in 1887 as the Hong Kong College of Medicine for Chinese by the London Missionary Society and formally established as the University of Hong Kong in 1911. It is the oldest tertiary institution in Hong Kong.

The university was established and proposed by Governor Sir Frederick Lugard in an effort to compete with the other Great Powers opening universities in China. The university's governance consists of three bodies: the Court, the council, and the Senate. These three bodies all have their own separate roles. The Court acts as the overseeing and legislative body of the university, the Council acts as governing body of the university, and the Senate as the principal academic authority of the university.

The university currently has ten academic faculties and 20 residential halls and colleges for its students, with English being its main medium of instruction and assessment.

The university has educated many notable alumni in many fields. Among them is Sun Yat-sen, the founder of the Republic of China, a graduate of the Hong Kong College of Medicine for Chinese, the predecessor of HKU. Notable alumni in the field of politics include Anson Chan, Carrie Lam, Jasper Tsang and Regina Ip.

== History ==
=== Founding ===
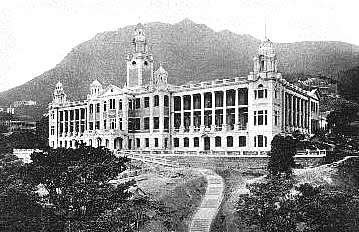
The Main Building in 1912

The origins of the University of Hong Kong can be traced back to the Hong Kong College of Medicine for Chinese, founded in 1887 by Ho Kai (later known as Sir Kai Ho Kai). It was renamed the Hong Kong College of Medicine in 1907. The college was later incorporated as HKU's medical school in 1911.

The University of Hong Kong was founded in 1911. The colony's governor, Sir Frederick Lugard (1858–1945), first proposed in January 1908 during a graduation ceremony at St Stephen's College to establish a university in Hong Kong to compete with the other Great Powers opening universities in China, most notably Germany, which had just opened the Tongji German Medical School in Shanghai. Sir Lugard saw the establishment of the university as an opportunity to promote British culture to China and the Chinese people through education, in turn enhancing Britain's influence in the Far East. He quoted saying, "We must either now take those opportunities or leave them for others to take...". Sir Hormusjee Naorojee Mody, an Indian Parsi businessman in Hong Kong, learned of Lugard's plan and pledged to donate HK$150,000 towards the construction and HK$30,000 towards other costs. The Hong Kong Government and the business sector in southern China, which were both equally eager to learn "secrets of the West's success" (referring to technological advances made since the Industrial Revolution), also gave their support. The Government contributed a site at West Point. Swire Group contributed £40,000 to endow a chair in Engineering, in addition to thousands of dollars in equipment (its aim was partly to bolster its corporate image following the death of a passenger on board one of its ships, SS Fatshan, and the subsequent unrest stirred by the Self-Government Society). Along with donations from other donors including the British government and companies such as HSBC, Lugard finally had enough to fund the building of the university.

Charles Eliot was appointed the university's first vice-chancellor. As Governor of Hong Kong, Lugard laid the foundation stone of the Main Building on 16 March 1910. The university was incorporated in Hong Kong as a self-governing body of scholars on 30 March 1911 and had its official opening ceremony on 11 March 1912. It was founded as an all-male institution; women were admitted for the first time ten years later.

The school opened with three founding faculties: Arts, Engineering, and Medicine. The Faculty of Medicine was previously founded as the Hong Kong College of Medicine for Chinese by the London Missionary Society in 1887. Of the college's early alumni, the most renowned was Sun Yat-sen, who led the 1911 Revolution, which transformed China from an empire (Qing dynasty) to a republic (Republic of China). In December 1916, the university held its first convocation, with 23 graduates and five honorary graduates.

=== Move towards Chinese cultural education, and WW2 ===
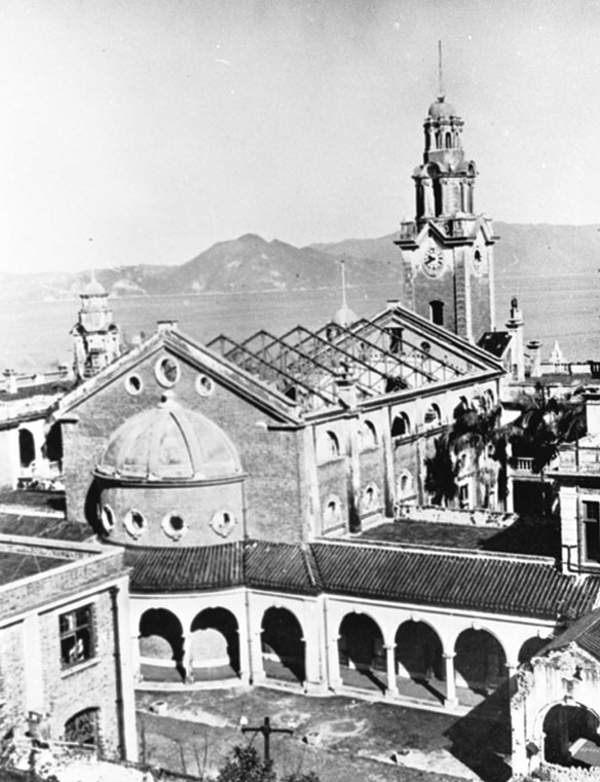
Main Building in 1946, with visible damage from the Second World War

After the Canton–Hong Kong strikes of 1925 and 1926, the government moved towards greater integration of Eastern culture, increasing the number of Chinese courses. In 1927, a degree in Chinese was created. Donations from wealthy businessmen Tang Chi Ngong and Fung Ping Shan – after whom two campus buildings are named – triggered an emphasis on Chinese cultural education. In 1937, the Queen Mary Hospital opened. It has served as the university's teaching hospital ever since. In 1941, the Japanese invasion of Hong Kong caused damage to university buildings, and the university closed until 1945; during this period, the university's medical school moved to Chengdu.

=== 1945 to 2001 ===
After the end of the Second World War, the university reopened and investment in law and the social sciences increased as post-war reconstruction efforts began in earnest. The Faculty of Social Sciences was established in 1967 and the Department of Law in 1969. The student population in 1961 was 2,000, quadrupled from 1941, and in 1980 the number of students exceeded 5,500.

In 1958, the librarian of University of Hong Kong, Mrs. Dorothea Scott, organised a meeting of over 40 library practitioners at the Fung Ping Shan Library on 3 April to determine and establish a library association for Hong Kong, the Hong Kong Library Association.

In 1982, the Faculty of Dentistry, based at the Prince Philip Dental Hospital, was established. To this day, it remains Hong Kong's only faculty training dental professionals. In 1984, both the School of Architecture and School of Education became fully-fledged faculties and in the same year the Faculty of Law was created. The Faculty of Business and Economics was established in 2001 as the university's tenth and youngest faculty.

After 1989, the Hong Kong government began to emphasise local tertiary education in order to retain local students who would otherwise have studied abroad in the United Kingdom. Student places and course variety were greatly increased in preparation for the handover of Hong Kong. By 2001, the number of students had grown to 14,300 and the number of degree courses to over a hundred.

=== 2001 to present ===
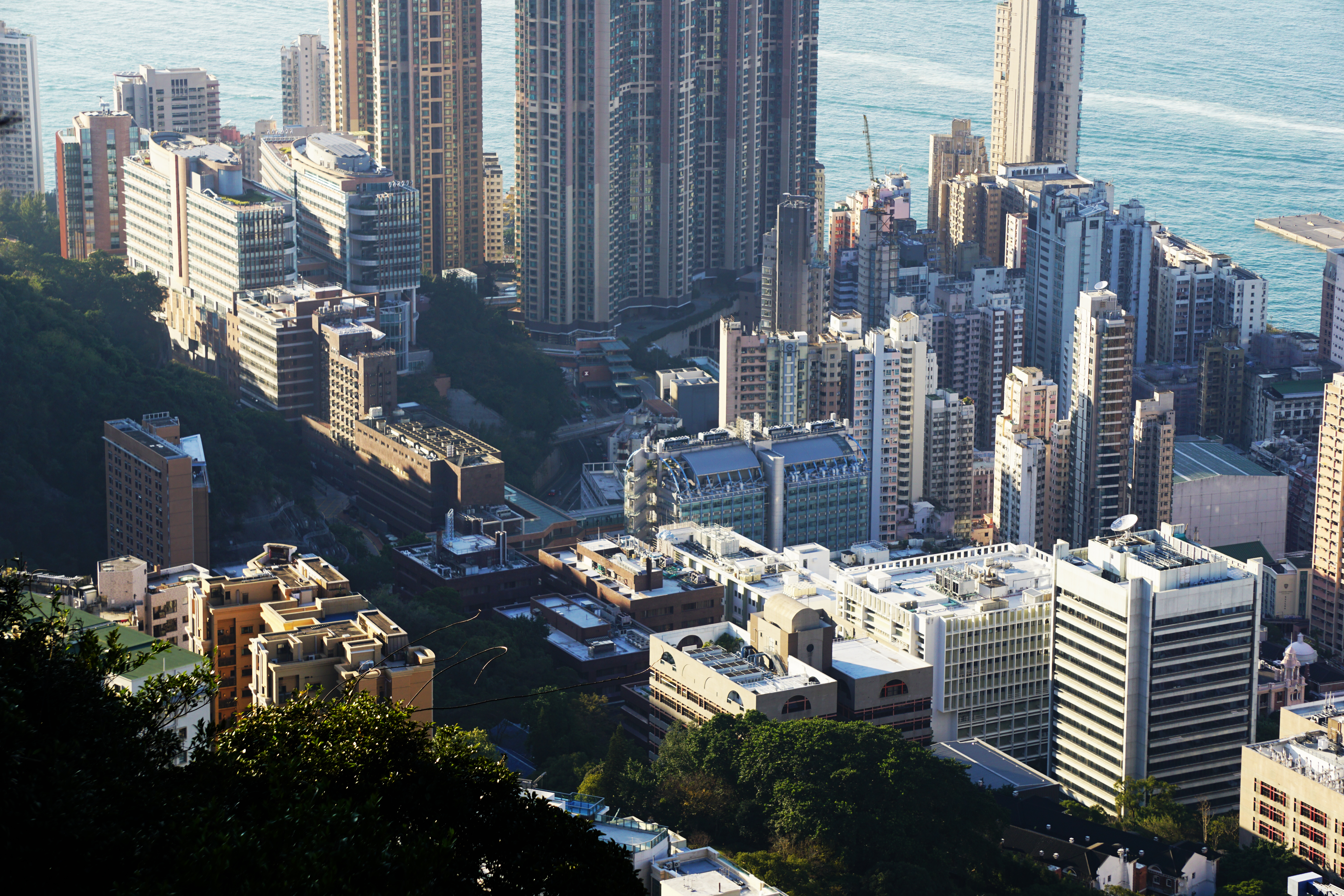
The university's campus in present day

In 2002, Growing with Hong Kong: The University and Its Graduates — The First 90 Years was published by the Hong Kong University Press as a study of the impact of HKU's graduates on Hong Kong.

In January 2006, despite protest from a portion of students and alumni, the Faculty of Medicine was renamed as the Li Ka Shing Faculty of Medicine "to recognize the generosity of Mr Li and his Foundation as well as the wish of the donors to support, in addition to the general development of the University, research and academic activities in medicine."

On 16 August 2011, Li Keqiang, Vice Premier of the People's Republic of China, began a three-day visit to promote development between Hong Kong and mainland China. The university was locked down. The mishandling by the police force caused the Hong Kong 818 incident. In a statement to the HKU community, the university vice-chancellor Lap-Chee Tsui admitted that the security arrangements could have been better planned and organised, and apologised to students and alumni for not having been able to prevent the incident. He assured them that "the University campus belongs to students and teachers, and that it will always remain a place for freedom of expression". On 30 August 2011, the university council resolved to set up a panel to review issues arising from the vice premier's visit, to improve arrangements and to set up policies for future university events that are consistent with its commitment to freedom of expression.

From 2010 to 2012, the university celebrated its 100th anniversary and the opening of the Centennial Campus at the western end of the university site in Pokfulam. The University of Hong Kong–Shenzhen Hospital, one of the two teaching hospitals of the university, also opened in 2011.

On 10 April 2015, HKU declared itself as the first university in the world to join HeForShe, a UN Women initiative urging men to achieve more female rights. The university promised that it would triple the number of female dean-level members by 2020, so that more than 1 out of every 5 deans would be women.

On 15 December 2017, the university's governing council appointed University of California, Berkeley nanoscience professor Xiang Zhang to the posts of President and Vice-Chancellor with effect from January 2018. Zhang was the first vice-chancellor of the university born in mainland China and educated to undergraduate degree level there.

On 4 September 2023, the university announced the appointment of Fraser Stoddart, a chemist and Nobel Laureate, as a Chair Professor. Stoddart has been a Board of Trustees Professor of Chemistry at Northwestern University, Illinois, United States, for the past 16 years. Stoddart's ground-breaking research has garnered numerous accolades and awards, including the prestigious 2007 King Faisal International Prize in Science. In 2016, he shared the Nobel Prize in Chemistry with Bernard L. Feringa and Jean-Pierre Sauvage for their work on the design and synthesis of molecular machines. HKU was "deeply saddened" to report the passing of Stoddart on 31 December 2024, at the age of 82.

On 17 October 2025, the university announced the appointment of Ferenc Krausz as Chair Professor at the Department of Physics. Krausz was awarded the Nobel Prize in Physics jointly with Pierre Agostini and Anne L'Huillier in 2023 "for experimental methods that generate attosecond pulses of light for the study of electron dynamics in matter." They generated and measured the first attosecond light pulse and used it to capture electron motion inside atoms, marking the birth of attophysics.

==== 2015 political interference ====
The HKU Council made headlines in 2015 for alleged political interference behind the selection process for a new pro-vice chancellor. A selection committee unanimously recommended the council appoint Johannes Chan to the post, which involved the responsibility for staffing and resources, and which had been left vacant for five years. Chan, the former dean of the Faculty of Law, was a distinguished scholar in constitutional law and human rights and "a vocal critic on Hong Kong's political reform issues". Owing to his liberal political stance, Chan was roundly criticised by Communist Party-controlled media including Wen Wei Po, Ta Kung Pao, and Global Times, which together published at least 350 articles attacking him.

Customarily the HKU Council accepts the recommendations of search committees for senior posts, with no prior recommendation having been rejected by the council. The council was criticised when it delayed the decision to appoint Chan, stating that it should wait until a new provost was in place. Finally, in September 2015, the council rejected Chan's appointment (12 votes to eight) through an anonymous vote in a closed meeting, providing no reason for the decision. Political interference was widely suspected and the opacity of the council criticised.

The decision is seen widely viewed as a pro-government act of retaliation against "pro-democracy leaders and participants" and a blow to academic freedom. Six members of the council are directly appointed by the Chief Executive of Hong Kong, who acts as chancellor of all publicly funded tertiary institutions in the territory. Five members are delegates to the National People's Congress in Beijing and, as such, are obliged to toe the Communist Party line or risk expulsion. In overall Council makeup, university students and staff are outnumbered by members from outside the university.

The decision was decried by student groups including the Hong Kong University Students' Union and Hong Kong Federation of Students, faculty members, leading international law scholars, and legislators. They noted that the decision would serve as a warning to other academics not to engage in pro-democratic politics and would severely tarnish Hong Kong's reputation for academic freedom and education excellence. The law faculty also refuted the allegations against Chan. Billy Fung, student union president, revealed details of the discussion to the public and was subsequently expelled from the council.

== Campuses ==
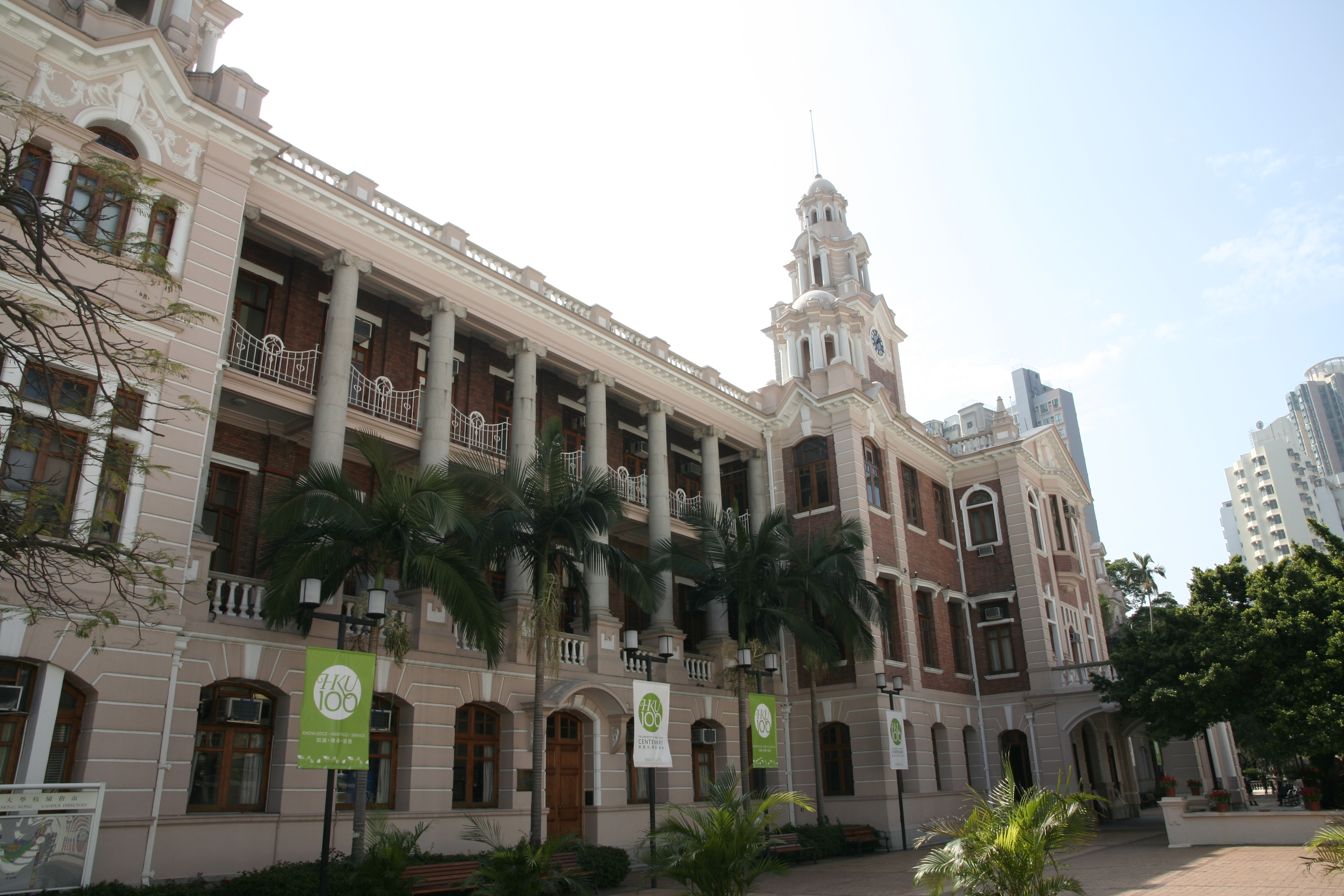
Main Building

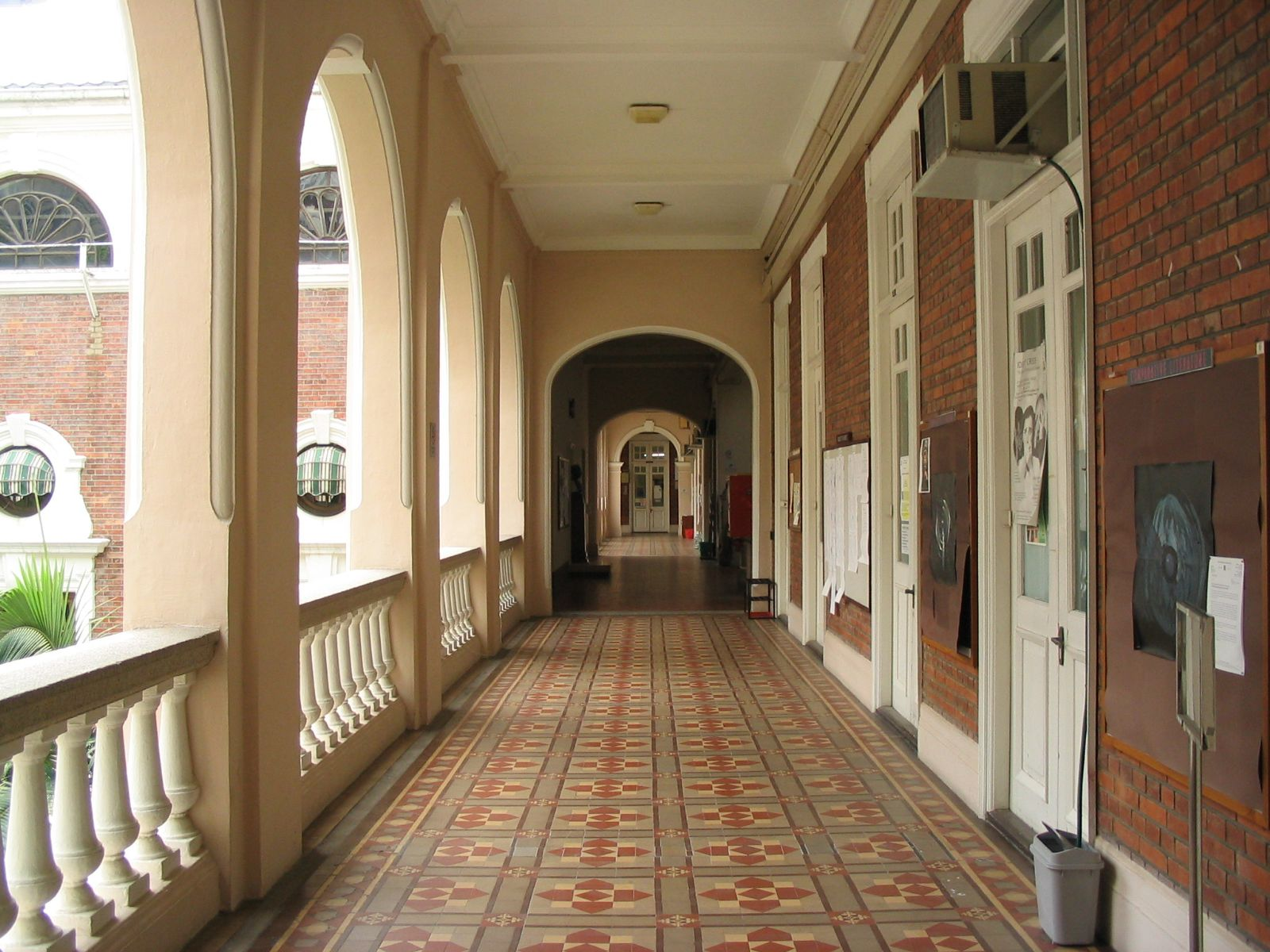
Main Building corridor

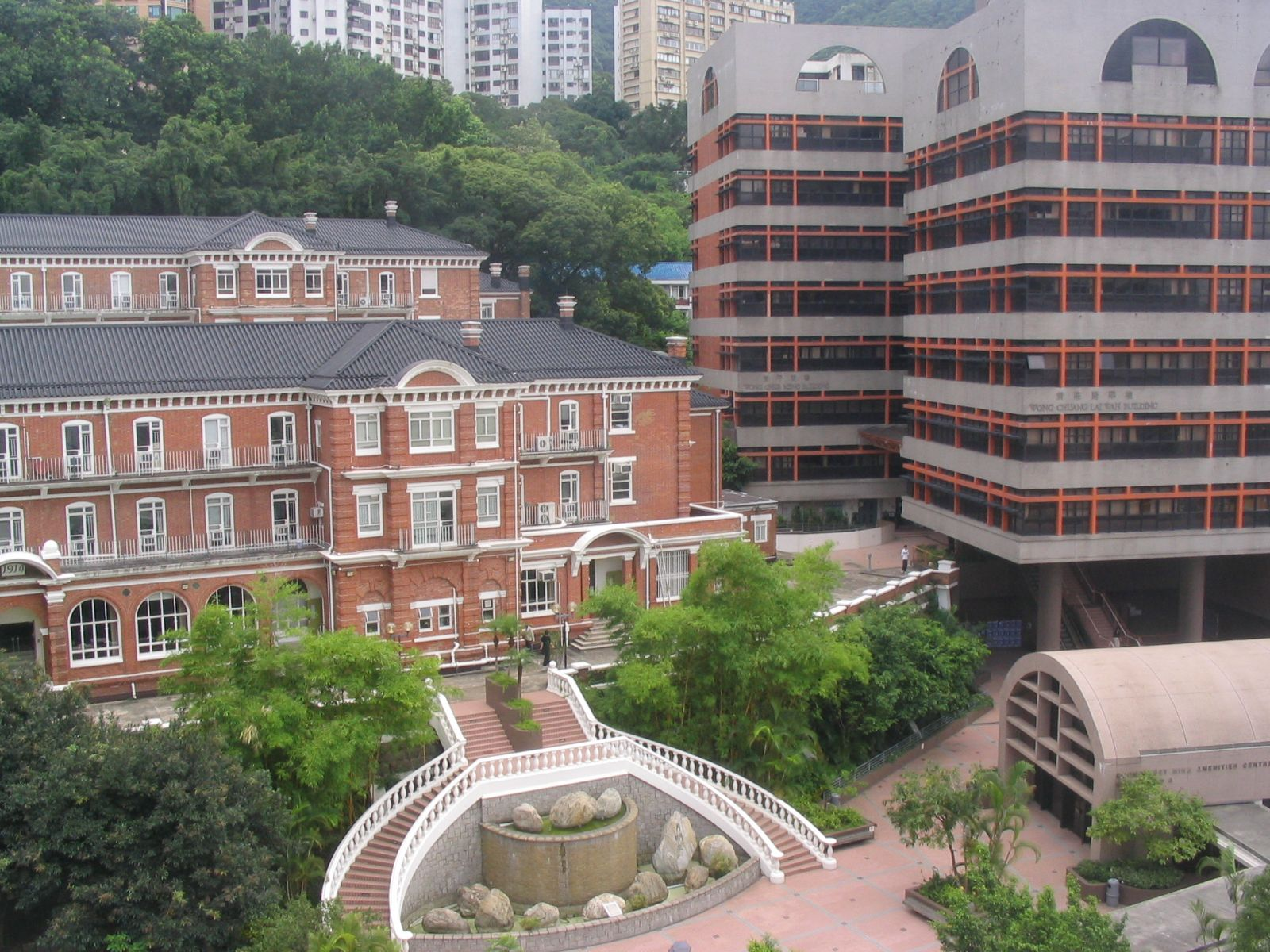
Eliot Hall, May Hall and Meng Wah Complex

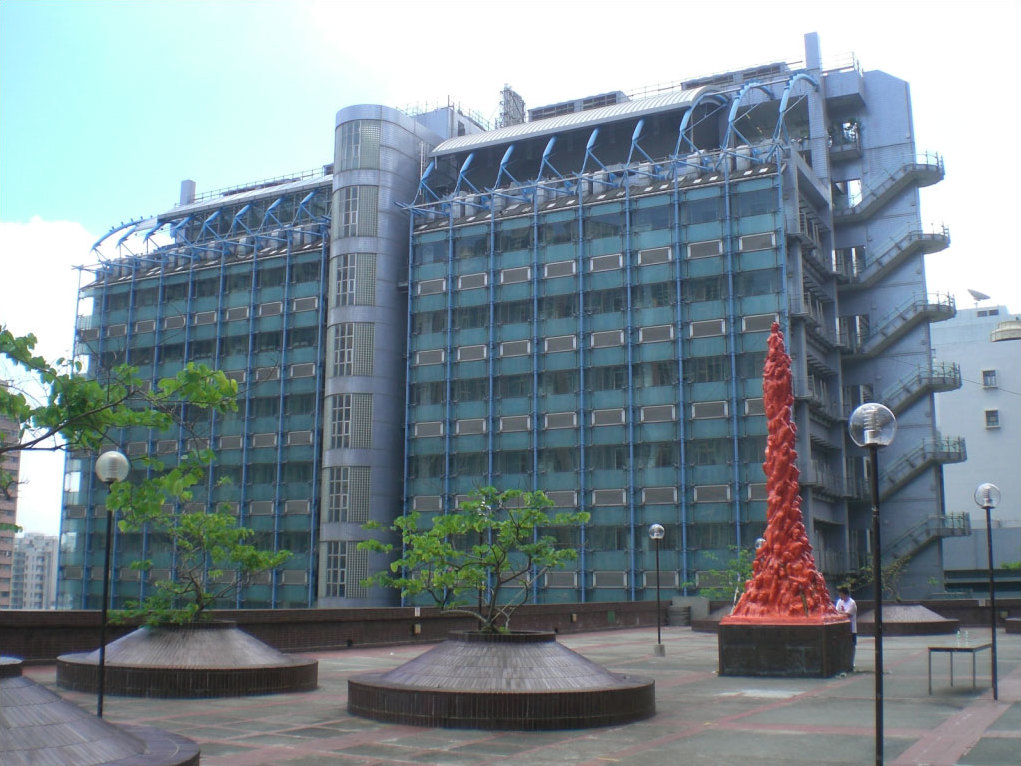
The Kadoorie Biological Sciences Building and the Pillar of Shame

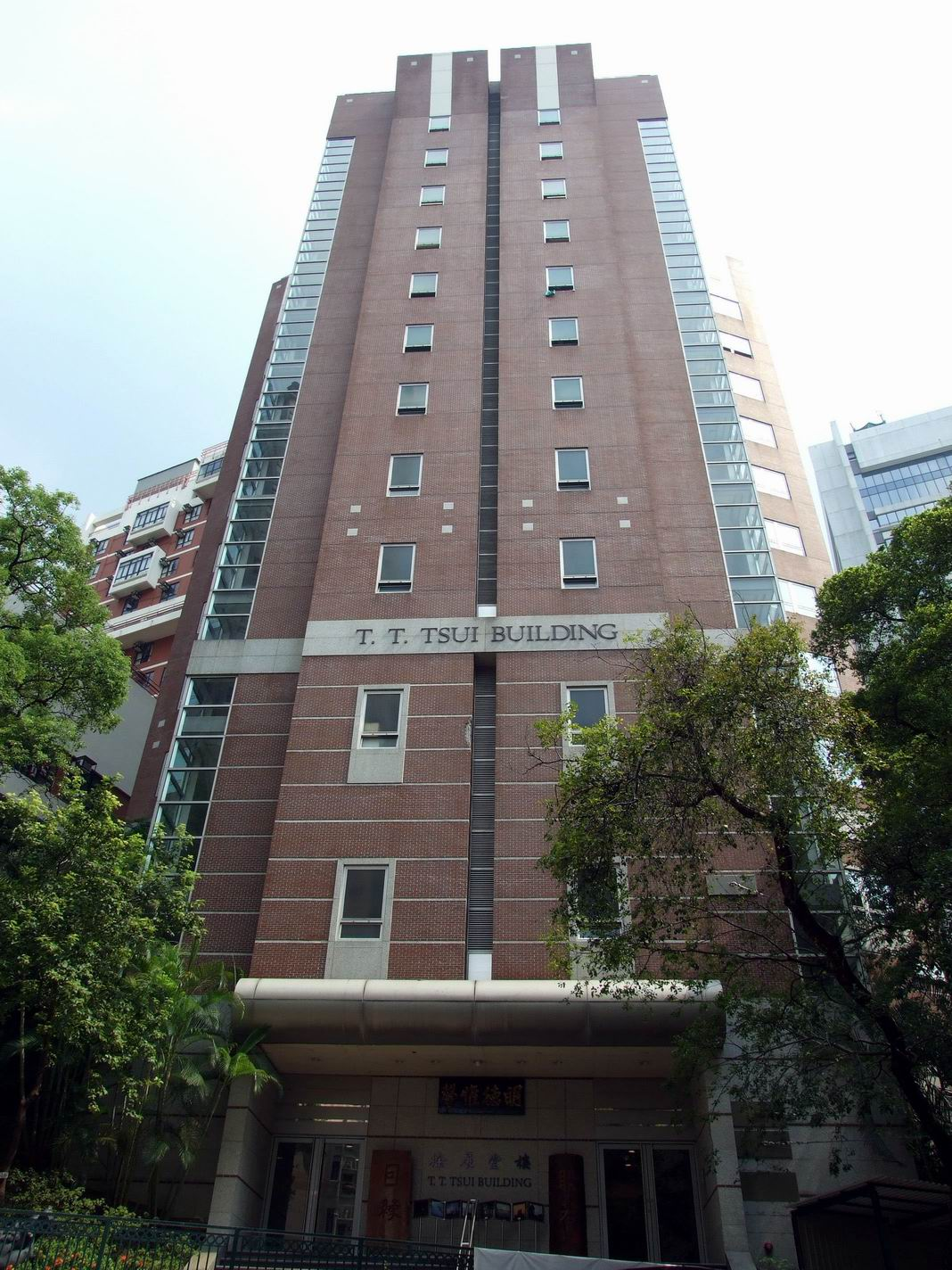
T.T. Tsui Building

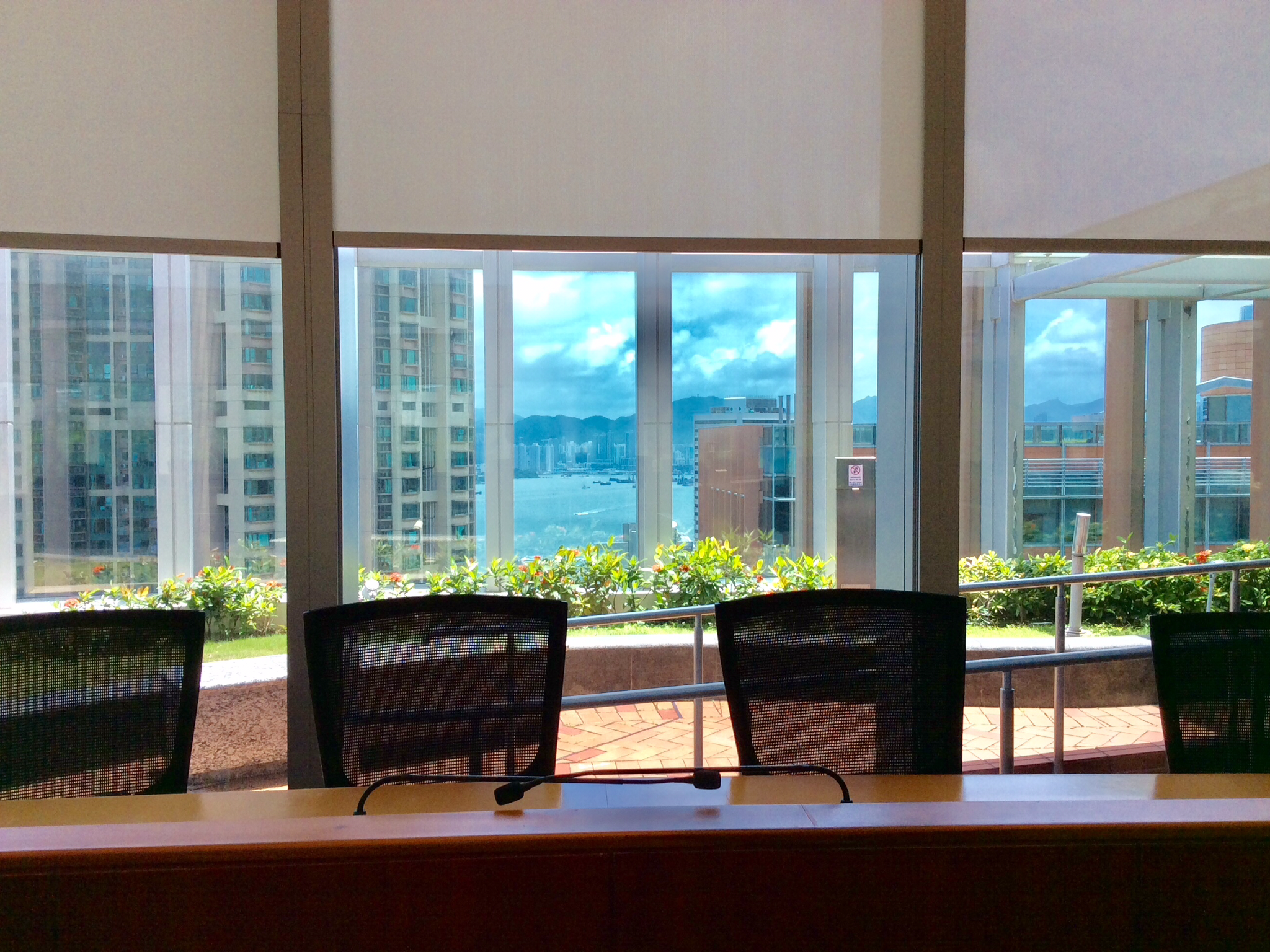
Academic Conference Room of the Faculty of Law at the Cheng Yu Tung Tower on the Centennial Campus with the view of Victoria Harbour

As at 9 December 2020, the university's main campus covers 177,000 square metres (1,910,000 sq ft) of land on Pokfulam Road and Bonham Road in Pokfulam, Hong Kong Island. The official address is “The University of Hong Kong, Pokfulam, Hong Kong’’. Buildings in the main campus include some of the finest heritage examples of British Colonial architecture in Hong Kong. The university lends its name to HKU MTR station, the mass transit access to the main campus, opened on 28 December 2014.

The university has additional campuses in other parts of the Hong Kong Island and the New Territories, as listed below. Since 2022, the university has expanded rapidly to include New Campuses in Shenzhen, China; Shanghai, China; and Barcelona, Spain.

The Li Ka Shing Faculty of Medicine is situated 4.5 km southwest of the main campus, on Sassoon Road in Pokfulam. The medical campus includes Queen Mary Hospital, the HKUMed Academic Building, and the William M.W. Mong Block. The Faculty of Dentistry is situated in the Prince Philip Dental Hospital, Sai Ying Pun.

The university also operates the Kadoorie Agricultural Research Centre, which occupies 95,000 square metres (1,020,000 sq ft) of land in the New Territories, and the Swire Institute of Marine Science at the southern tip of Cape D'Aguilar on Hong Kong Island.

=== Centennial campus ===
To provide additional space for students under the new four-year undergraduate curriculum the Centennial Campus was built at the western end of the main campus, which was previously occupied by the Water Supplies Department. The construction of the campus started in late 2009, and was completed in 2012, the first year of the introduction of the new academic structure in Hong Kong. In 2012, the Faculty of Arts, the Faculty of Law and the Faculty of Social Sciences moved to the Centennial Campus.

=== New campuses since 2022 ===
In July 2021, HKU Business School announced its new campus in Shenzhen, China.

In October 2025, it was announced that HKU would set up its new campus in Barcelona, Spain.

In March 2026, HKU announced its new campus in Shanghai, China.

=== Well-known buildings ===
==== Main building ====
Constructed between 1910 and 1912, the Main Building is the university's oldest structure and was sponsored by Sir Hormusjee Naorojee Mody and designed by Architect Messrs Leigh & Orange. It is built in the post-renaissance Edwardian Baroque style with red brick and granite and has two courtyards. The main elevation is articulated by four turrets with a central clock tower (a gift from Sir Paul Chater in 1930). The two courtyards were added in the south in 1952 and one floor in the end block in 1958. The building was originally used as classrooms and laboratories for the Faculty of Medicine and Engineering and was later the home of departments within the Faculty of Arts. The central Great Hall (Loke Yew Hall) is named after Loke Yew, a Malayan benefactor of the university in its early years. It became a declared monument in 1984.

==== Swire building ====
Around 1980, the Swire Group sponsored the building of a new residential hall in the eastern end of the campus. The new student residence was named Swire Building in honour of this sponsorship. The building was officially opened by Mr John Anthony Swire CBE on 11 November 1980. In 1983, the colour orange was chosen to be the hall colour in the second Annual General Meeting since the colour was used as the background colour during the first open day of Swire Hall and no other halls were using orange as their hall colour.

In 1983, Mrs J. Lau (Director of Centre Media Resources) provided a design for the hall logo. The Swire Hall Students' Association, HKUSU, then made some amendments to that design. The logo shows the words 'S' and 'H'. The design of the word 'S' looks like two hands holding each other, signifying that all hall-mates should co-operate with each other, and promoting the hall motto 'Unity and Sincerity'.

==== Hung Hing Ying Building ====
Financed by Sir Paul Chater, Professor G. P. Jordan and others, it was opened in 1919 by the Governor of Hong Kong Sir Reginald Edward Stubbs and housed the students' union. After World War II, the building was used temporarily for administrative purposes. The East Wing was added in 1960. The building was converted into the Senior Common Room in 1974. It was named in honour of Mr Hung Hing-Ying in 1986 for his family's donations to the university. The building was subsequently used again for administrative purposes, and housed Department of Music and the Music Library until early 2013. It is currently used by the Development & Alumni Affairs Office. The two-storey Edwardian style structure is characterised by a central dome and the use of red brick to emulate the Main Building opposite. The building became a declared monument in 1995.

==== Tang Chi Ngong Building ====
The idea to establish a school of Chinese was proposed in the inter-war period. Construction of the premises began in 1929 following a donation from Tang Chi-ngong, father of the philanthropist Sir Tang Shiu-kin, after whom the building was named. It was opened by Sir William Peel, Governor of Hong Kong, in 1931 and since then further donations have been received for the endowment of teaching Chinese language and literature. The building has been used for other purposes since the 1970s but the name remained unchanged. It housed the Centre of Asian Studies until 2012 and now houses the Jao Tsung-I Petite Ecole. This three-storey flat-roofed structure is surfaced with Shanghai plaster and became a declared monument in 1995.

== Academics ==
=== Admission ===
Admission to HKU is highly competitive. In 2016, the university received around 40,000 applications for undergraduate studies, over 16,000 of which were from outside the Hong Kong schools' system. For Mainland China applicants, the enrollment rate was 1 student for every 21 applications.

Undergraduate candidates are selected according to their relative merit in the local public examination (HKDSE) and apply online via JUPAS. Other applicants, including overseas students or ones taking other examinations, are classified as non-JUPAS applicants who are required to apply via the official website, where postgraduate applications may also be made.

=== Teaching and learning ===
Most undergraduate courses are 4-year degrees while the medical and nursing programmes require two and one more year(s) of studies respectively. English is the main medium of instruction, and the university's Senate has endorsed English as the campus lingua franca. Starting from 2012, local students are required to take Academic English courses and Chinese language enhancement courses; however, students who are native-speakers of languages other than Chinese, and students who have not studied Chinese language in their secondary curriculum can be exempted from the Chinese course requirement. Cantonese credit-courses for mainland Chinese and Taiwan students, and ab initio Mandarin Chinese and Cantonese credit-courses for international and exchange students are offered by the Chinese Language Centre, School of Chinese.

=== Research ===
The university is a founding member of Universitas 21, an international consortium of research-led universities, and a member of the Association for Pacific Rim Universities, the Association of Commonwealth Universities, Washington University in St. Louis's McDonnell International Scholars Academy, and many others. HKU benefits from a large operating budget supplied by high levels of government funding compared to many Western countries. In 2018/19, the Research Grants Council (RGC) granted HKU a total research funding of HK$12,127 million (41.3% of overall RGC funding), which was the highest among all universities in Hong Kong. HKU professors were among the highest paid in the world as well, having salaries far exceeding those of their US counterparts in private universities.

HKU research output, researchers, projects, patents and theses are profiled and made publicly available in the HKU Scholars Hub. 100 members of academic staff (>10% of professoriate staff) from HKU are ranked among the world's top 1% of scientists by the Thomson Reuters' Essential Science Indicators, by means of the citations recorded on their publications. The university has the largest number of research postgraduate students in Hong Kong, making up approximately 10% of the total student population. All ten faculties and departments provide teaching and supervision for research (MPhil and PhD) students with administration undertaken by the Graduate School. In 2025, about 434 HKU scholars are listed in Stanford University's latest 2025 Top 2% Scientists for the “Single recent year” category, while another 376 made it to the “Career Long” category. Among these scholars, Xiang Zhang (HKU President) and Guochun Zhao are both ranked the top 10 globally in their respective areas.

The University Grants Committee delivered the idea of “knowledge transfer” among the community and universities. From the academic year 2009/10, a yearly recurrent funding for universities to invest in knowledge transfer has been approved by the Legislative Council. Therefore, HKU has established the Knowledge Exchange Office in 2010.

=== Libraries and museums ===
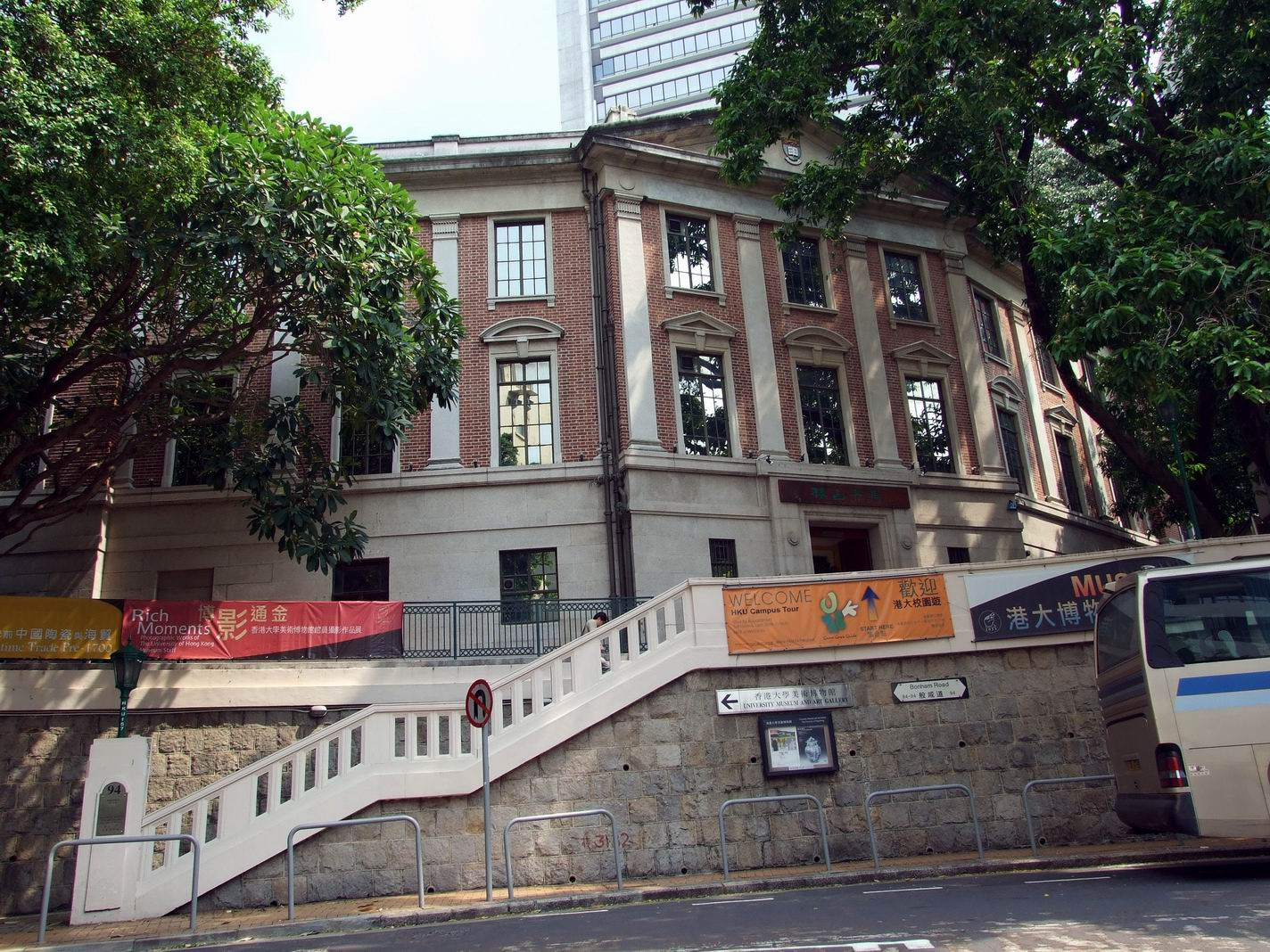
The University Museum and Art Gallery from Bonham Road

HKU Libraries (HKUL) was established in 1912, being the oldest academic library in Hong Kong with over 2.3 million current holdings. It comprises the Main Library and six specialist branch libraries: the Dental, Education, Fung Ping Shan (East Asian Language), Yu Chun Keung Medical, Lui Che Woo Law, and Music libraries. They are located in buildings around the campus with varying opening hours. A web-based library catalogue, DRAGON, allows one to search HKUL's books, journals and other resources.

The HKUL Digital Initiatives, through its digitisation projects, has opened up online access to local collections originally in print format. The first HKUL Digital Initiative, ExamBase, was launched in 1996 and other projects of scholarly interests were introduced. More digital projects are being developed to provide continuous access to digital content and services. It provides open access to Chinese and English academic and medical periodicals published in Hong Kong.

The three-storey Fung Ping Shan Building was erected in 1932 originally as a library for Chinese books. Named after its donor, the building consists of masonry on the ground level surmounted by a two-storey red-brick structure with ornamental columns topped by a pediment over its entrance. Since 1962, the Chinese books collection, now known as the Fung Ping Shan Library, was transferred to the university's Main Library and the whole building was converted into a museum for Chinese art and archaeology. Among its collections are ceramics, pottery and bronze sculptures. In 1996, the lowest three floors of the new Tsui Building were added to the old building to form the University Museum and Art Gallery.

== Reputation and rankings ==
University rankings

Global – Overall
- ARWU World: 62 (2026)
- QS World: 11 (2027)
- THE World: 33 (2026)
- THE Reputation: 49 (2025)
- USNWR Global: 40 (2026)

Regional – Overall
- QS Asia: 1 (2027)
- THE Asia: 6 (2026)
- USNWR Asia: 8 (2026)

=== Overall ranking ===
HKU was ranked #11 worldwide and #1 in Asia in QS World University Rankings 2027, #33 worldwide in Times Higher Education World University Rankings 2026, #62 worldwide in Academic Ranking of World Universities 2026, and #40 worldwide in U.S. News 2026–2027.

The Aggregate Ranking of Top Universities (ARTU), which sorts universities based on their aggregate performance across Times Higher Education World University Rankings, QS World University Rankings, and Academic Ranking of World Universities, found that HKU was the 42nd best-ranked university worldwide in 2023.

HKU is ranked 49th in the THE World Reputation Rankings 2025.

HKU is ranked as the most international university in the world in 2023 by Times Higher Education.

=== Subject ranking ===
==== QS subject rankings ====
In the QS World University Rankings Top Global Subject Ranks 2026:

| Broad subject area | HKU's world rank |
|---|---|
| Dentistry | 2nd |
| Education & Training | 5th |
| Geography | 11th |
| Architecture and Built Environment | 14th |
| Library & Information Management | 15th |
| Data Science and Artificial Intelligence | 18th |
| Arts and Humanities | 19th |
| Law & Legal Studies | 20th |
| Civil & Structural Engineering | 20th |

==== THE subject rankings ====
In the Times Higher Education World University Rankings by subject 2026:

| Subject | HKU's world rank |
|---|---|
| Arts & Humanities | 55th |
| Business and Economics | 40th |
| Clinical & Health | 18th |
| Computer Science | 47th |
| Education | 7th |
| Engineering | 37th |
| Law | 27th |
| Life Sciences | 47th |
| Physical Sciences | 37th |
| Psychology | 62rd |
| Social Sciences | 33rd |

=== Graduate Employability Ranking ===
HKU graduates ranked 47th worldwide in the Times Higher Education's Global University Employability Ranking 2022, and 10th worldwide in the QS Graduate Employability Rankings 2022. HKU ranked 11th globally and 1st in Asia in QS World University Rankings 2026.

== Student life ==
Student welfare is served by several units, including the Centre of Development and Resources for Students (CEDARS), which provides guidance for most areas of student life including career counselling, students activities, financial support and more, and the University Health Service, which provides health care, referrals, and preventive services.

=== Demographics ===
The student population of the university was 39,166 in the 2023–2024 academic year, comprising 18,491 undergraduates, 16,541 taught postgraduates and 4,134 research postgraduates. The university has become a popular choice for mainland and international students, with 19,145 non-local students (excluding exchange students) on campus in 2023, comprising 47.2% of the total students.

=== Halls and colleges ===
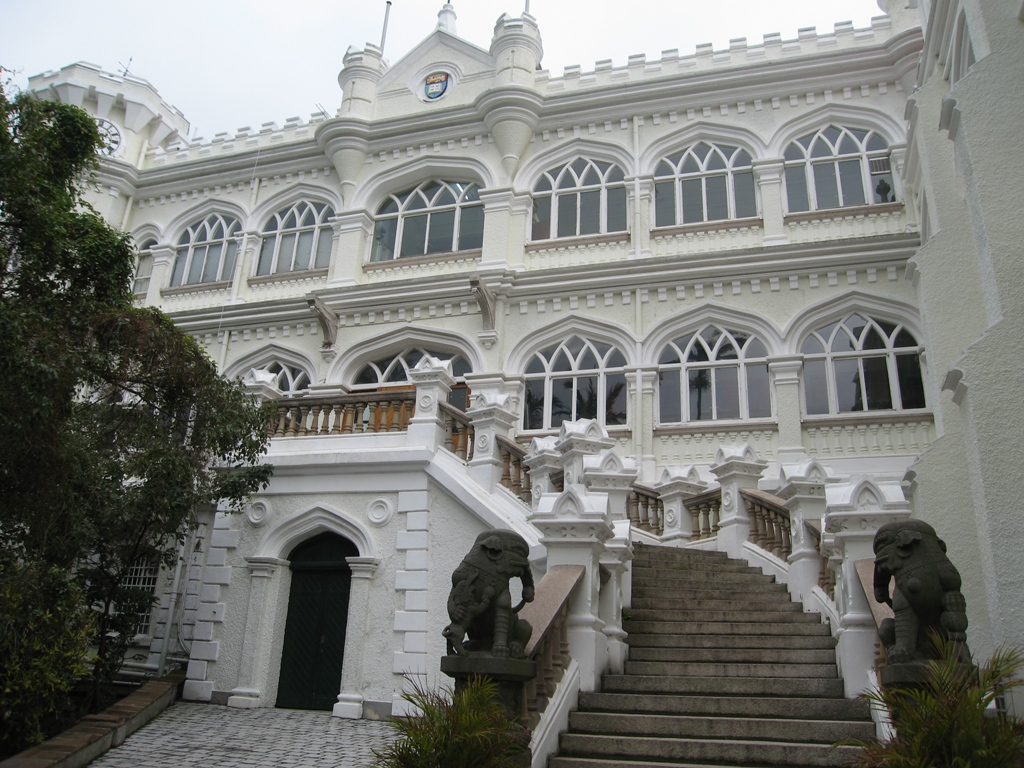
University Hall

There are 20 residential halls and colleges for undergraduates, postgraduates and visitors.

The residential halls include:

- Main Campus – Swire Hall and Simon K. Y. Lee Hall, mainly for undergraduates. Graduate House and Robert Black College, primarily for postgraduates and visitors respectively.
- Sassoon Road Campus – Lee Hysan Hall, Richard Charles Lee Hall, Wei Lun Hall and Madam S. H. Ho Hall Residence for Medical Students.
- Jockey Club Student Village I (founded in 2001) – Lady Ho Tung Hall and Starr Hall.
- Jockey Club Student Village II (founded in 2005) – Morrison Hall, Lee Shau Kee Hall and Suen Chi Sun Hall.
- Jockey Club Student Village III (founded in 2012) – made up of four residential colleges, Shun Hing College, Chi Sun College, Lap-Chee College and New College. They provide a total of 1,800 beds for students of whom 67% are non-local students.
- Jockey Club Student Village IV – made up of four residential colleges. They provide a total of 1,238 hostel places for students.
- Other historical student residences include St. John's College, Ricci Hall and University Hall.

Moreover, there are two non-residential halls:

- Hornell Hall (male only)
- Lee Chi Hung Hall (co-educational)

=== Student organisations ===
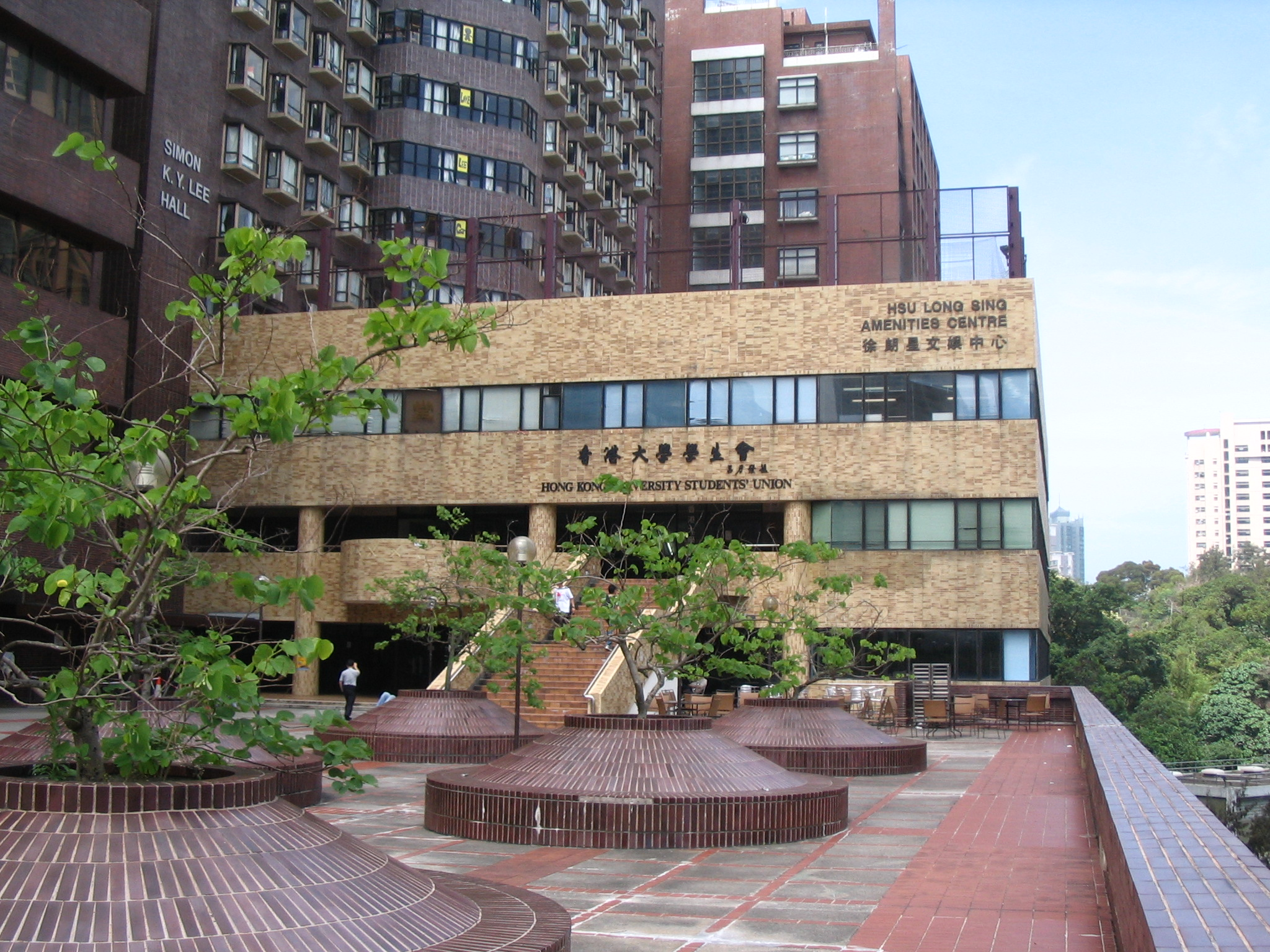
The Students' Union Building before its revamp in 2011

Two officially recognised student bodies, formerly three, provide opportunities for postgraduate students to participate in extracurricular activities. The two being the Postgraduate Student Association (PGSA) and the HKU Business School Postgraduate Student Association (HKUBSPA). Undergraduate students participate in student societies registered with the university's Co-Curricular Support Office (CCSO).

The Hong Kong University Students' Union (HKUSU), which represented both undergraduate and postgraduate students, existed as an officially recognised student body from 1912 to 2021, with a majority of its members being undergraduate students. The union ceased to be officially recognised by the university after passing a motion in memorial to a deceased assailant who stabbed a police officer in the wake of the protests in 2021. Prior to the withdrawal of recognition by the university, HKUSU was the parent body of more than a hundred student societies. Student societies are now registered with the university's CCSO.

This organisation was renowned amongst student activists, having been the main driving force behind evicting a vice-chancellor in recent years. There were controversies in 2011 when the president of the union, Ayo Chan, remarked that some of the protesters involved in the 1989 Tiananmen Square protests and massacre had acted irrationally. Many students believed his remarks to be offensive and subsequently ousted the President by a vote in under one week.

=== Study abroad programme ===
Every year, over 1,000 undergraduates participate in exchange programmes. As part of their HKU degree, they study at universities spanning 40 countries around the world with the support of the University Grants Committee, University of Hong Kong Foundation for Educational Development and Research, Hongkong Bank Foundation, UBC Alumni Association (Hong Kong), Dr. Lee Shiu Scholarships for Hong Kong and South-East Asia Academic Exchange, Shell (Hong Kong) Limited, C. V. Starr Scholarship Fund, and others.

The university welcomes a similar number of students from those 340 partner universities onto the HKU campus to study each year. HKU is also a member of the Laidlaw Scholars programme which provides funding for undergraduates to conduct research abroad, either independently or at another university in the network such as University College London and University of Leeds. Through the Exchange Buddy Program, students from abroad can choose to be matched with local students with whom they can correspond before they arrive in Hong Kong. These local students greet the visiting students upon arrival at the airport, help them to settle into student residence and offer advice and support during their stay.

== Organisation and administration ==
=== Governance ===
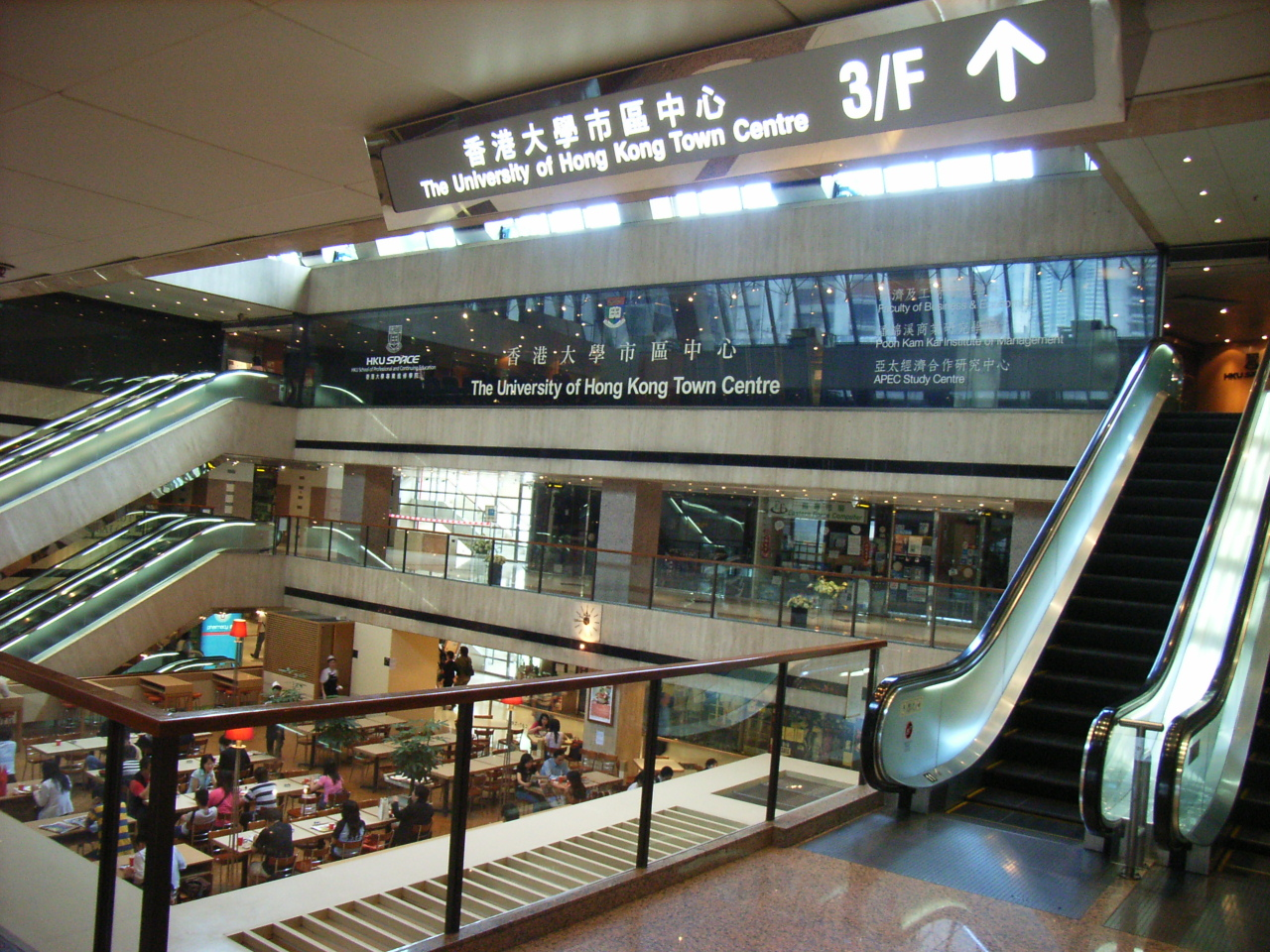
HKU SPACE Admiralty Learning Centre

==== Chancellor ====
Prior to Hong Kong's handover, the colony's governor was the de jure chancellor of the university. That role was assumed by the chief executive following the handover. The chancellor is officially the chief officer of the university and president of the Court, the duties and functions of the role are however delegated to the pro-chancellor, a person appointed by the chancellor.

The chief executive's role as the university's chancellor is enshrined in the University of Hong Kong Ordinance.

In the absence of the chief executive, the person for the time being assumes the duties of the chief executive is simultaneously appointed as the acting chancellor and has all powers and duties of the chancellor.

For a list of pre and post-handover university chancellors, refer to the articles for the governor of Hong Kong and the chief executive of Hong Kong.

==== Vice-Chancellor ====
The vice-chancellor is the principal academic and administrative officer of the university. The current office holder is Xiang Zhang.

==== The Court ====
The Court is a large overseeing and legislative body comprising University and lay members. The purpose of the Court is to represent the wider interests of the communities served by the university. It has the power to make, repeal and amend statutes.

The Court currently consists of:

- The Chancellor
- The Pro-Chancellor
- The Vice-Chancellor
- The Deputy Vice-Chancellor
- The Pro-Vice-Chancellors
- The Treasurer of the university
- The Registrar of the university
- Life Members
- Members of the Senate and Council
- The chairman, deputy chairman, and Clerk of the Convocation
- Five members from the Legislative Council*
- Twelve members from the Standing Committee of Convocation*
- Five members elected by the Court
- Three members from the Grant Schools Council*
- Three members from the Hong Kong Subsidized Secondary Schools Council*
- Not more than twenty members appointed by the Chancellor

* Elected amongst their members

==== The Senate ====
The Senate is the principal academic authority of the university. It is responsible for all academic matters and welfare of students. Its 50 members are mainly academic staff while there are also student representatives. The Senate is chaired by the vice-chancellor.

The Senate currently consists of:

- The Vice-Chancellor
- The Deputy Vice-Chancellor
- The Pro-Vice Chancellors
- The Dean of each faculty
- The Chairman of each Board of the faculty
- Twelve professors*
- Six teachers*, not being professors
- The Director of the School of Professional and Continuing Education
- The Dean of the Graduate School
- The Librarian
- The Dean of Student Affairs
- Three full-time students*, at least one of whom being an undergraduate and one of whom being a postgraduate

* Elected in accordance with regulations

==== The Council ====
The council is the body which governs the university. It is responsible for the management of financial and human resources of the university and for the university's future developments. The council comprises university members (both staff and students) and lay members (i.e. neither staff nor students of the university), with a ratio of lay to university members of 2:1 members are serving on the council as trustees in their personal capacity. The current chairman of the council is Priscilla P.S. Wong.

The current council consists of:

- The Chairman of the Council
- The Vice-Chancellor of the university
- 6 persons, not being students or employees of the university, appointed by the Chancellor
- 6 persons, not being students or employees of the university, appointed by the Council
- 2 persons, not being students or employees of the university, elected by the Court
- Treasurer of the university
- 4 full-time teachers*
- 1 full-time employee of the university*, not being a teacher
- 1 full-time undergraduate student*
- Secretary to the Council

* Elected in accordance with regulations

The current council consists of 24 persons. The chancellor has the power to appoint the chairman of the council and six other members to the council. The vice-chancellor is in turn appointed by the council.

=== Faculties ===
The university has ten faculties, namely the Faculties of Architecture, Arts, Business & Economics, Dentistry, Education, Engineering, Law, Science, Social Sciences, and the Li Ka Shing Faculty of Medicine, alongside a graduate school and a number of non-faculty academic units, which provide various study programmes and courses for students. Four Schools operate independently, namely the School of Biomedical Engineering, School of Computing and Data Science, School of Future Media, and the School of Innovation. The medium of instruction in most classes is English.

Additionally, HKU operates two associate institutions:

- HKU SPACE (School of Professional and Continuing Education), which was first established as the Department of Extramural Studies in 1956, and later renamed in 1992. It solely awards 2-year associate degrees, 2-year Diplomas, Advanced or Higher Diploma Programmes (2-years to 3-years), 1-year Certificates, and individual courses. It also partners with overseas post-secondary institutions, colleges and universities.
- Centennial College, a liberal arts college established in 2012. It has provided self-financed 4-year bachelor's degree programmes for HKALE, HKDSE and other graduates from September 2012.

=== Shield, motto and coat of arms ===
HKU's shield of arms, granted in 1913

HKU's full achievement of arms, granted in 1984

The design of the university's shield of arms was proposed to the College of Arms by the university in October 1912. On 14 May 1913, the shield, along with two mottoes (one in Latin, one in Chinese) was granted by the College of Arms. The field resembles the lions on the coat of arms of England, whereas the book on the shield is a common reference to university's role in learning and knowledge. The official blazon and all authentic colour copies of the shield of arms were lost during the Sino-Japanese War, which the university obtained new ones from the College of Arms in 1958 while preparing for the Golden Jubillee set to happen 3 years later.

The Latin motto Sapientia et Virtus is translated into English as "Wisdom and Virtue". The Chinese motto on the pages of the opened book, written from top to bottom, right to left in accordance with traditional Chinese writing direction, contains two phrases: 明德, ming tak, 'illustrious virtue'; and 格物, kak mat, 'the investigation of things'. The first phrase, ming tak, makes homage to the opening sentence of classic Confucian Classical Chinese literature the Great Learning, in which the author discusses the three great duties of a ruler: illustrious virtue, the renewal of the people, and repose in the highest good. The second phrase, kak mat, is a reference to the writing of Confucian scholar Zhu Xi 致知在格物 (lit. 'exhausting by examination the principles of things and affairs'). The phrase occurs in discussion regarding how wise rulers set about cultivating wisdom and virtue. If one desires to rectify their heart, they must first sought to be sincere in their thoughts. Wishing to be sincere in their thoughts, they must first extended to the utmost their knowledge. Such extension of knowledge lay in the investigation of things.

In 1981, the year of the university's 70th anniversary, an application was made to the College of Arms for a full achievement of arms, which was granted in 1984, comprising the original shield and mottoes with the addition of a crest, supporters, a helmet and compartment. The supporters of the coat of arms are a Chinese dragon and a lion representing Britain, indicating the university's aspiration to blend East and West cultures, from the foundation by British people in Hong Kong and the later development of the university's research and studies in both west and east culture and technology, whereas the compartment is an allusion to Hong Kong Island, where the university is located. The university remains to this day the only university in Hong Kong to be granted a full coat of arms by the College of Arms. The other university in Hong Kong to have been granted a coat of arms by the College of Arms was The Chinese University of Hong Kong in 1961; it is, however, not a full achievement of arms owing to a missing crest.

=== University Mace ===
The Mace is the symbol of the university's authority. Made of silver gilt, the mace is 40 inches long and weighs about 300 ounces, with the two collars of the mace being set with amber-red and green jade stones. The drum bears the university's shield of arms, which is enamelled in colour and encircled within a buckled belt displaying the motto. On both sides of the drum are full-length four-toed Chinese dragons. The original mace went missing during the Sino-Japanese War and was replaced.

A mace bearer is appointed by the vice-chancellor to bear the university's mace. The current mace bearer is Gordon Wong Tin Chun. The university's mace is carried in university processions by the mace bearer, symbolising the university's authority. The mace bearer will always precede the presiding officer in the procession for this reason.

=== University Anthem ===
The recording of the reconstructed University Anthem was recorded by the Hong Kong Sinfonietta, the Diocesan Choral Society and the former HKU Students' Union Choir (now known as the HKU University Choir), conducted by the Sinfonietta's musical director, Yip Wing-sie, with new orchestration by Chan Hing-yan, Chairperson of the Department of Music.

| Words in Latin | English Translation |
|---|---|
| Finis hic operum! Domus Stat potens Academia, Unde ab occiduis recens Ampliore flust plagis Mox doctrina meatu. | Here end our labours! Strong stand the buildings of the university, whence modern learning soon will flow from western land in more ample course. |
| Fons ubi est sapientia? Et, Scientia, qua lates? Pontus has negat in suis Subditas latebris, negat Has se Terra tenere. | Where is the fountain of wisdom? And how, O science, art thou hidden? The Sea denies that these are concealed in his hiding-place and the Earth denies that she contains them. |
| En! Dei reverentia Hac scientia! Qui malis Abstinet, sapit. Hoc diu Munere assidue valentem Exercete iuventam! | Lo! The fear of God–that is science! Whoso abstains from evil, he is wise. Long and earnestly may ye train youth's vigour in this duty! |
| Pandite ostia! Iam Deo gratias agimus. Dei semper auxilio novum Splendeat sapientiae Lumen ex Oriente! Amen. | Fling open the gates! Now we give thanks to God. By God's grace may the new light of wisdom ever shine out from the East! Amen. |

== Notable alumni ==
The University of Hong Kong has educated many notable alumni in many varied fields. Among them is Sun Yat-sen, the founder of Republic of China, who was a graduate of the Hong Kong College of Medicine for Chinese, the predecessor of HKU. Over 40 principal officials, permanent secretaries, Executive Council and Legislative Council members of the Hong Kong SAR Government are HKU graduates. HKU graduates also form the senior management teams of many large organizations in the private sector.

In recent years Guan Yi became a notable figure when his research and work on SARS led to the successful identification of the SARS-Coronavirus and its infectious source from live animal markets and helped the Chinese Government successfully avert the second SARS outbreak in early 2004.

Regina Ip Lau Suk-yee, born in 1950, she is a prominent Hong Kong politician and former senior civil servant. She was the first woman to be appointed as the Director of Immigration, and later served as the Secretary for Security from 1998 to 2003. She obtained her bachelor degree (B.A.) with a First Class Honor from the University of Hong Kong.

Ray Chan, the co-founder and CEO of 9GAG, was also a notable alumni graduated from The University of Hong Kong. He has earned a Bachelor of Laws (LLB) degree. 9GAG, founded in 2008, was originally a side project created by him and his friends when they were still studying in the University of Hong Kong.

== See also ==
- Vice-Chancellors of the University of Hong Kong
- Education in Hong Kong
- Hong Kong University Students' Union
- List of buildings and structures in Hong Kong
- List of higher education institutions in Hong Kong
- List of oldest universities in continuous operation
- The University of Hong Kong Faculty of Law
- The Asian Institute of International Financial Law
