= NCCU College of Commerce =

NCCU College of Commerce (CNCCU)
- 國立政治大學商學院
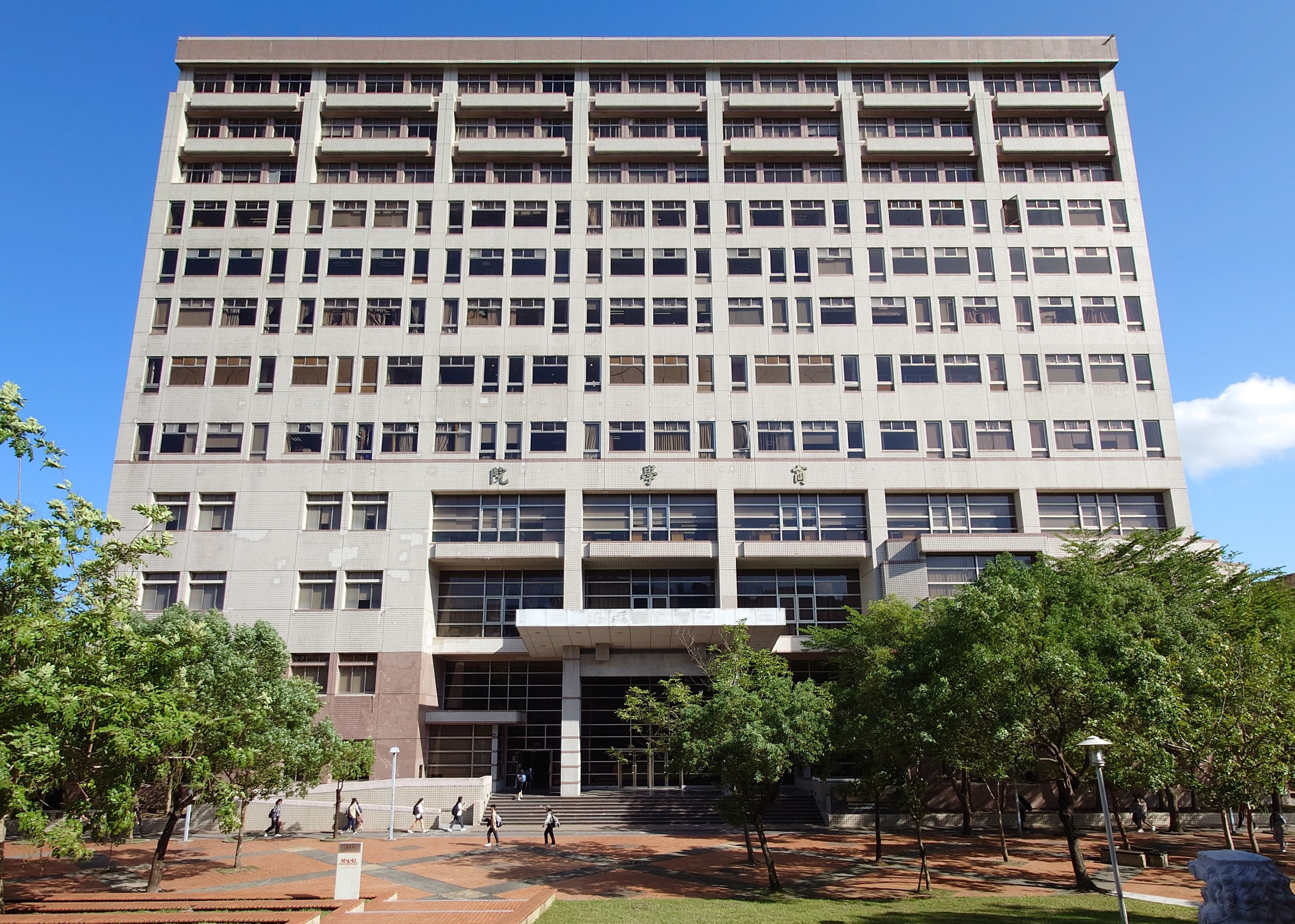
- Type: A college of NCCU
- Established: 1958
- Academic staff: 148
- Location: Taipei City
- Affiliations: Harvard Business School Institute for Strategy & Competitiveness; Association to Advance Collegiate Schools of Business; European Quality Improvement System; Global Innovation Challenge; Partnership in International Management; AACSB Accounting; Beta Gamma Sigma; AAPBS; Chartered Financial Analyst; Chartered Institute of Management Accountants; Gloria; IE University School of Global and Public Affairs; Graduate Business Forum
- Website: College of Commerce, NCCU

The College of Commerce (CNCCU; Chinese: 商學院; pinyin: Shāng Xuéyuàn) at National Chengchi University (NCCU) was established in 1958 and CNCCU was the first collegiate business school founded in Taiwan after 1945. CNCCU also initiated MBA, IMBA and DBA degrees in Taiwan. CNCCU is a Member business school of Partnership in International Management, a consortium of over 60 best business schools around the world created by Ecole des Hautes Etudes Commerciales (HEC), New York University (NYU), and London Business School (LBS). The College of Commerce is regarded nationally as one of the best business schools in Taiwan, and CNCCU has a wide range of business accreditation reviews which is comparable to top business schools in the world, such as KAIST College of Business, the Secretariat of AAPBS. CNCCU is often viewed as the flagship faculty (including the impact of Alumni networking) of National Chengchi University. According to Eduniversal's official selection, CNCCU is in 5 Palmes Rank as a "Universal Business School". There are 8 departments, 1 graduate institute, and 16 research centers in the college.

== Special programs ==
=== MBA programs ===
The College of Commerce teaches several MBA programs, each with a distinct focus on management education in Taiwan:

- MBA Program
- International MBA (IMBA)
- EMBA

=== International Exchange Program (IEP) ===
The International Exchange Programs at College of Commerce in NCCU was set forth in 1999 with the aim of providing incoming international students from its partner schools with the opportunities to acquire direct exposure and training within an Asian context and to nurture the aspiration in our domestic students. There are currently about 100 exchange students from over 60 top business schools in the world and about 200 international students from over 30 different countries in College of Commerce in NCCU.

=== English Taught Program (ETP) ===
ETP Program is a special program which aims to train local students' English as well as their professional ability in management. It found in 2000, and accepted freshman only after examination every September.

=== PhD Programs ===
The College of Commerce offers English Taught PhD courses joint offered by college's 8 Departments & 1 Graduate Institute

- PhD Programs

== Accreditations ==
National Chengchi University is the first university in Taiwan earned two international accreditation of college of commerce.

=== AACSB ===
On 20 December 2006, National Chengchi University earned international accreditation of AACSB International (The Association to Advance Collegiate Schools of Business) for its business school.

=== EQUIS ===
EQUIS (European Quality Improvement System) is an international programme for the assessment of European education in economic and business sciences. College of Commerce in National Chengchi University was awarded this international accreditation in April 2010.

== Departments and institutes ==
There are 9 departments and institutes in National Chengchi University College of Commerce as follows, and each department offer several different programs:

- Dept. of International Business (BBA, MS, PhD)
- Dept. of Money and Banking (BBA, MS, PhD)
- Dept. of Accounting (BBA, MS, PhD)
- Dept. of Statistics (BBS, MS, PhD)
- Dept. of Business Administration (BBA, PhD, DBA)
- Dept. of Management Information Systems (BBA, MS, PhD, DBA)
- Dept. of Finance (BBA, MS, PhD)
- Dept. of Risk Management & Insurance (BBA, MS, PhD)
- Graduate Institute of Technology, Innovation & Intellectual Property Management (MS, PhD, DBA)

== Partner schools ==
National Chengchi University College of Commerce has exchange partnerships with over 70 universities in five different continents. Each year, over 150 students go abroad on their exchange and the school welcomes over 150 incoming exchange students. Partner schools include as follows:

Asia

- China
  - Shanghai Jiao Tong University, Antai College of Economics & Management
  - Tsinghua University, School of Economics and Management
  - Renmin University of China, School of Business
  - Peking University, Guanghua School of Management
  - Graduate University of Chinese Academy of Sciences
  - Fudan University
- Hong Kong
  - Chinese University of Hong Kong, Faculty of Business Administration
  - City University
  - Hong Kong University of Science and Technology, School of Business and Management
- Japan
  - Waseda University, Graduate School of Commerce
  - Nagoya University of Commerce and Business
  - Hitotsubashi University, School of Commerce and Management
  - International University of Japan, Graduate School of International Management
  - Kyoto University, Graduate School of Management
- South Korea
  - Sungkyunkwan University, School of Business
  - KAIST Business School
- India
  - Indian School of Business
  - Indian Institute of Management Bangalore
- Thailand
  - Chulalongkorn University, Sasin Graduate Institute of Business Administration
- Israel
  - Tel Aviv University, Leon Recanati Graduate School of Business Administration
- Turkey
  - Bilkent University, Faculty of Business Administration
- Philippines
  - Asian Institute of Management
- Singapore
  - National University of Singapore, NUS Business School
  - Nanyang Technological University, Nanyang Business School

Australia

- Australia
  - University of Queensland
  - Queensland University of Technology
  - Griffith University, Business School
- New Zealand
  - University of Waikato

Europe

- Switzerland
  - University of St. Gallen
  - University of Lausanne, Faculty of Business and Economics
- Italy
  - Bocconi University (Università Commerciale Luigi Bocconi)
- Finland
  - Aalto University School of Economics
- Netherlands
  - Maastricht University, Faculty of Economics and Business Administration
  - Tilburg University, Faculty of Economics and Business Administration
  - Erasmus University, Rotterdam School of Management
  - University of Amsterdam, Faculty of Economics and Business
- Spain
  - University of Navarra, School of Economics and Business Administration
  - EADA Business School
  - ESADE Business School
- Germany
  - WHU Koblenz Otto Beisheim Graduate School of Management
  - University of Cologne, Faculty of Management, Economics and Social Sciences
  - Leipzig Graduate School of Management
  - International University Schloss Reichartshausen, European Business School
  - University of Mannheim, Business School
- Czech Republic
  - University of Economics, Prague
- Belgium
  - Universite catholique de Louvain, Louvain School of Management
- France
  - Groupe ESC Dijon-Bourgogne
  - ESCP Europe
  - Skema Business School
  - Lille Catholic University, IESEG School of Management
  - Reims Management School
  - ESCEM School of Business and Management Tours-Poitiers
  - EM Lyon
  - Audencia Nantes School of Management
  - Grenoble Ecole de Management
- Poland
  - Warsaw School of Economics
- Denmark
  - Copenhagen Business School
- England
  - University of Exeter
  - University of Sussex
  - Bradford University, School of Management
  - Aston University
  - Lancaster University
- Portugal
  - Catholic University of Portugal, School of Economics and Management
- Norway
  - Norwegian School of Economics and Business Administration (NHH)
- Hungary
  - Corvinus University of Budapest, Faculty of Business Administration
- Austria
  - Vienna University of Economics and Business
  - University of Innsbruck, School of Management

North America

- United States
  - Tulane University, A. B. Freeman School of Business
  - University of St. Thomas
  - University of Florida, Warrington College of Business Administration
  - Ohio State University, Fisher College of Business
  - Purdue University, Krannert School of Management
  - George Mason University, School of Management
  - Claremont Graduate University, School of Information Science
  - University of Washington, School of Business Administration
  - Brandeis University, International Business School
- Canada
  - York University, Schulich School of Business
  - Simon Fraser University, School of Business Administration
  - University of Western Ontario, Richard Ivey School of Business
  - McMaster University, Michael G.DeGroote School of Business
  - University of Calgary, Haskayne School of Business
- Costa Rica
  - INCAE Business School
- Honduras
  - Universidad Tecnologica Centroamericana
- Mexico
  - ITAM

South America

- Brazil
  - FGV-EAESP
  - Universidade de Brasília
