= Steffen Roth =

German sociologist (born 1976)

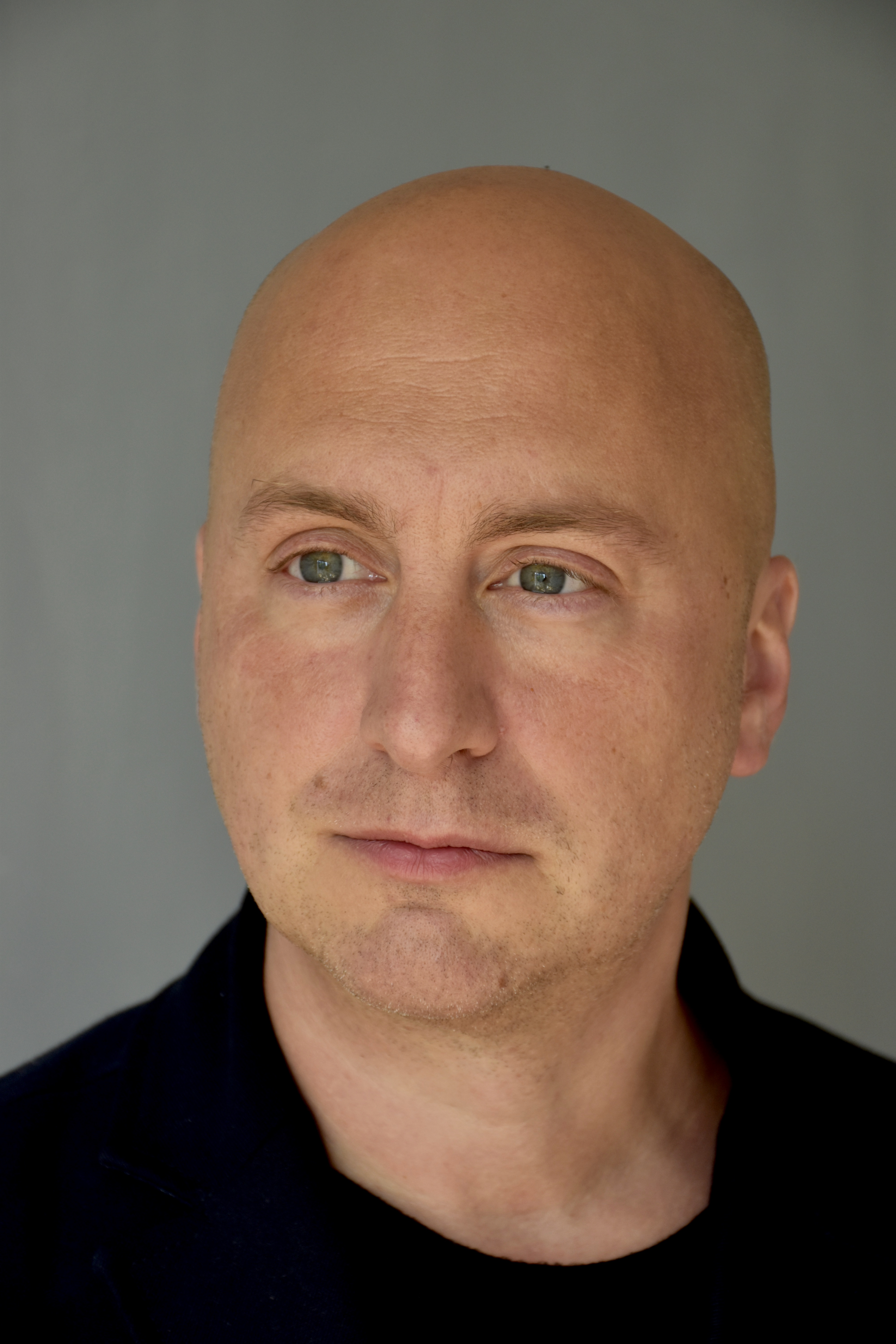
- Born: 8 August 1976 (age 50); Würzburg, West Germany
- Education: Technische Universität Chemnitz; University of Geneva
- Known for: Digital Transformation of Social Theory
- Scientific career
- Fields: Social Theory; Systems Theory; Management Theory; Organization Theory
- Workplaces: La Rochelle Business School; KSU Vilnius; University of Witten-Herdecke; University of Cambridge

Steffen Roth (born 8 August 1976 in Würzburg) is an academic and author on management, economics, and sociology. He is currently a Full Professor of Management at La Rochelle Business School and a Visiting Fellow of Wolfson College, University of Cambridge.

== Academic Background ==
Roth earned his Diploma in Sociology from Chemnitz University of Technology in 2002, his PhD in Economics and Management (Dr. rer. pol) from the same university in 2010, and his PhD in Sociology from the University of Geneva in 2013. He holds a Habilitation (facultas docendi) in Economic and Environmental Sociology awarded by the Italian Ministry of Education, University, and Research and the Title of Docent (venia legendi) of Economic Sociology from the University of Turku. In 2021, Kazimieras Simonavičius University in Vilnius bestowed upon Roth the Title of Full Professor of Social Sciences.

== Career ==
From 2010-2011, Roth was a Visiting Professor and Open Society Institute and Soros Foundations Network Academic Fellow at the Yerevan State University Department of Sociology. From 2012 to 2016 and 2017, respectively, he was a tenured Assistant Professor of Management and Organization at the ESC Rennes School of Business and Visiting Professor at the International University of Rabat. As of 2021, he has been a Visiting Professor of Management and Organization at the University of Witten-Herdecke. From 2022 to 2024, Roth served as President of the Senate of Kazimieras Simonavičius University.

== Research ==
Roth is a social systems theorist influenced by the works of Niklas Luhmann. His research focus is on theories and applications of functional differentiation in modern societies. Roth was among the first to apply culturomics in sociology, with one major result of this research being that the (self-) definition of modern societies as capitalist or economized may be inappropriate. Further fields of research include multifunctional organizations and markets, the digital transformation of social theory, and foresight and future studies.

== Service to the Scientific Community ==
Roth is an Editor-in-Chief of Kybernetes as well as the Field Editor for social systems theory of Systems Research and Behavioral Science. He is also a Member of the Editorial Boards of Sociology and Cybernetics and Human Knowing, and a member of the Executive Committee of the Inter-University Center Dubrovnik.
