= Kazimieras Simonavičius University =

University in Vilnius, Lithuania

Kazimieras Simonavicius University
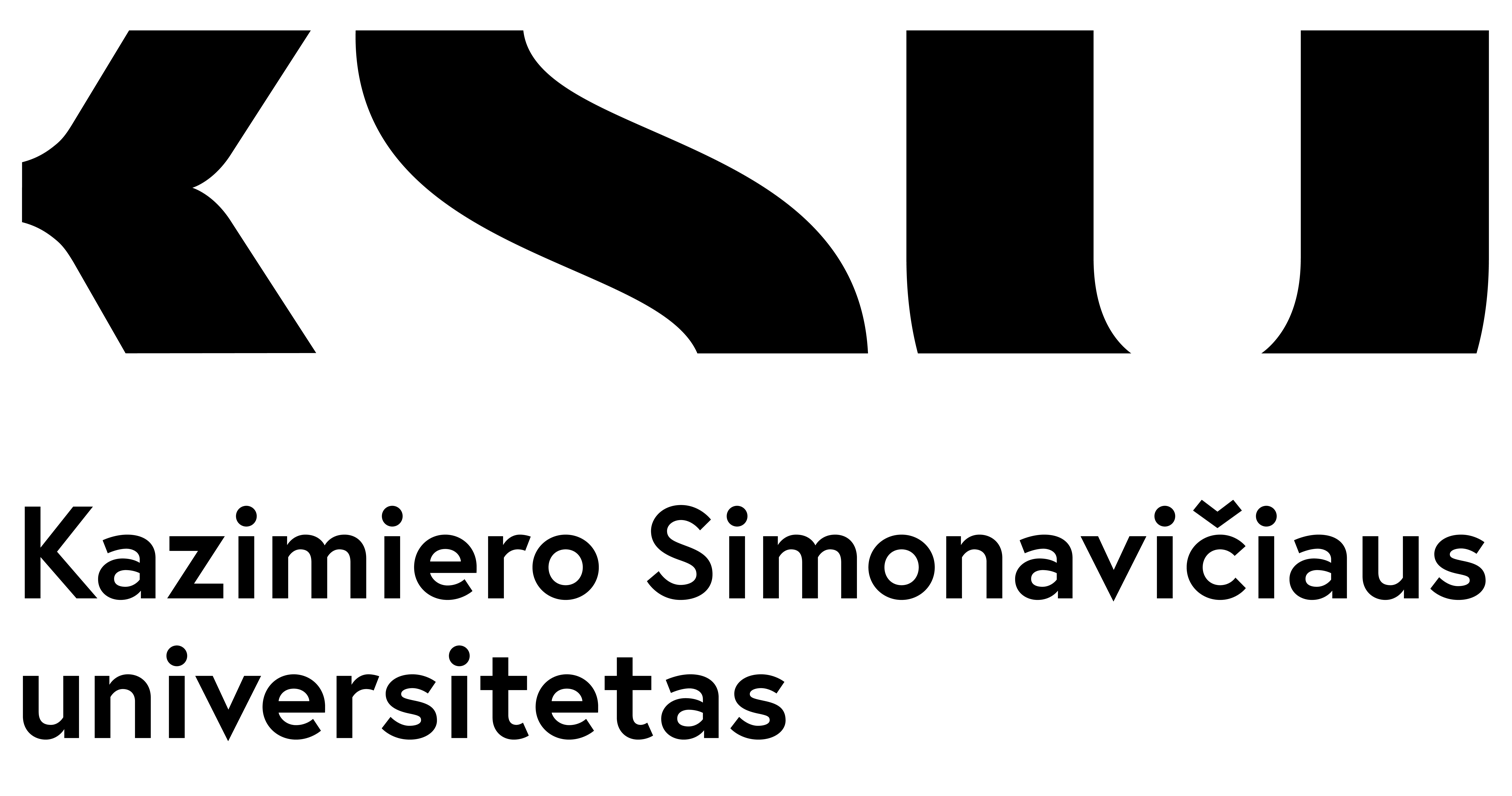
- Former name: Vilnius Academy of Business Law
- Type: Private Research University
- Established: 2003; 23 years ago
- Rector: Gitana Neverienė
- Location: Vilnius, Lithuania
- Website: ksu.lt

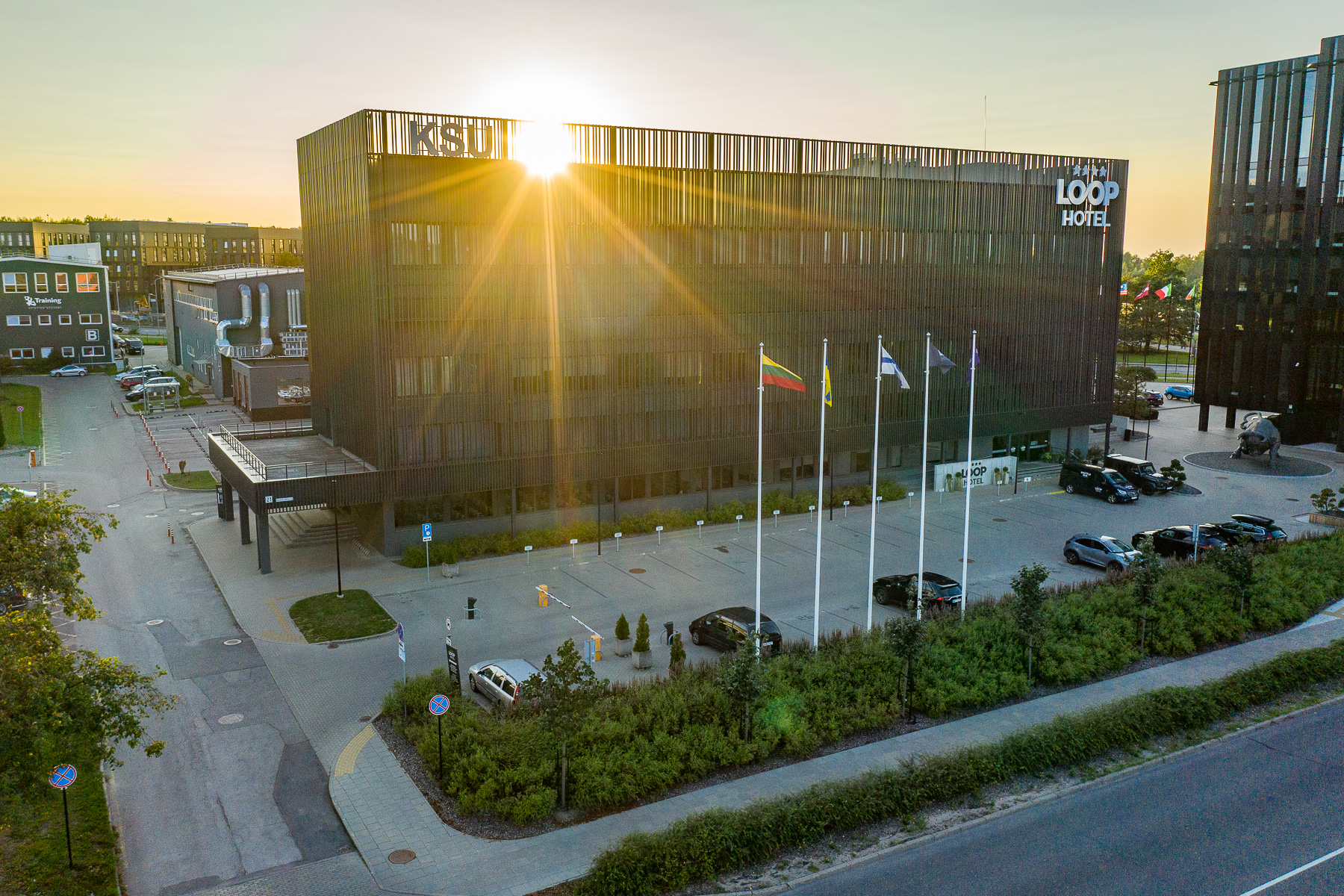
Vilnius campus of the Kazimieras Simonavičius University

Kazimieras Simonavičius University (previously: Vilnius Academy of Business Law (VABL), Lithuanian: Vilniaus verslo teisės akademija) is a private, state-accredited research university in Vilnius, Lithuania. The Ministry of Education and Science of the Republic of Lithuania licensed the former Vilnius Academy of Business Law on August 26, 2003. Teaching started in 2004. In 2012, the university changed its name to honour Kazimierz Siemienowicz, a military engineer, artillery specialist, and pioneer of rocketry.

== History ==
The university was established as the Vilnius Academy of Business Law in 2003 and expanded to Klaipėda in 2004.

The Next Society Institute was founded in 2020 as an institute affiliated with Kazimieras Simonavičius University, with Steffen Roth serving as its founding director.

In 2025, the Research Council of Lithuania ranked Kazimieras Simonavičius University 1st in terms of research outcomes per full-time equivalent researcher and 6th in terms of absolute outcomes out of 36 Lithuanian universities in the field of social sciences for the evaluation period of 2024.

== International partnerships in higher education ==
The University has student exchange agreements with over 100 universities all over the world. KSU offers multiple opportunities for students and academics to participate in foreign professional training's and educational projects. Each semester there are compulsory and optional courses, which are taught by foreign academics from all over the world.

== Location ==
The main campus of Kazimieras Simonavičius University is located in Vilnius.

== Notable Faculty ==
- Arūnas Augustinaitis (*1958), communication theorist and professor, former Rector
- Helga Marija Kauzonė (*1970), politician and author, former Vice-Minister for Health, former Director of the Kaunas Hospital of the Lithuanian University of Health Sciences, Vice-Rector for Research
- Andrius Navickas (1972) (*1972), journalist and politician
- Steffen Roth (*1976), academic and author on management, economics, and sociology, Full Professor of Management at Excelia Business School, Visiting Fellow of Wolfson College, Cambridge, Full Professor of Social Science, former President of the Senate, Founding Director of the Next Society Institute
- Živilė Simonaitytė (*1986), politician, former Vice-Minister for Health and Deputy General Auditor of the Republic of Lithuania
- Kazimieras Liudvikas Valančius (1936–2018), academic and author on business law, Dean, Full Professor
