= Huang Chih-peng =

Taiwanese politician

- 黃志鵬
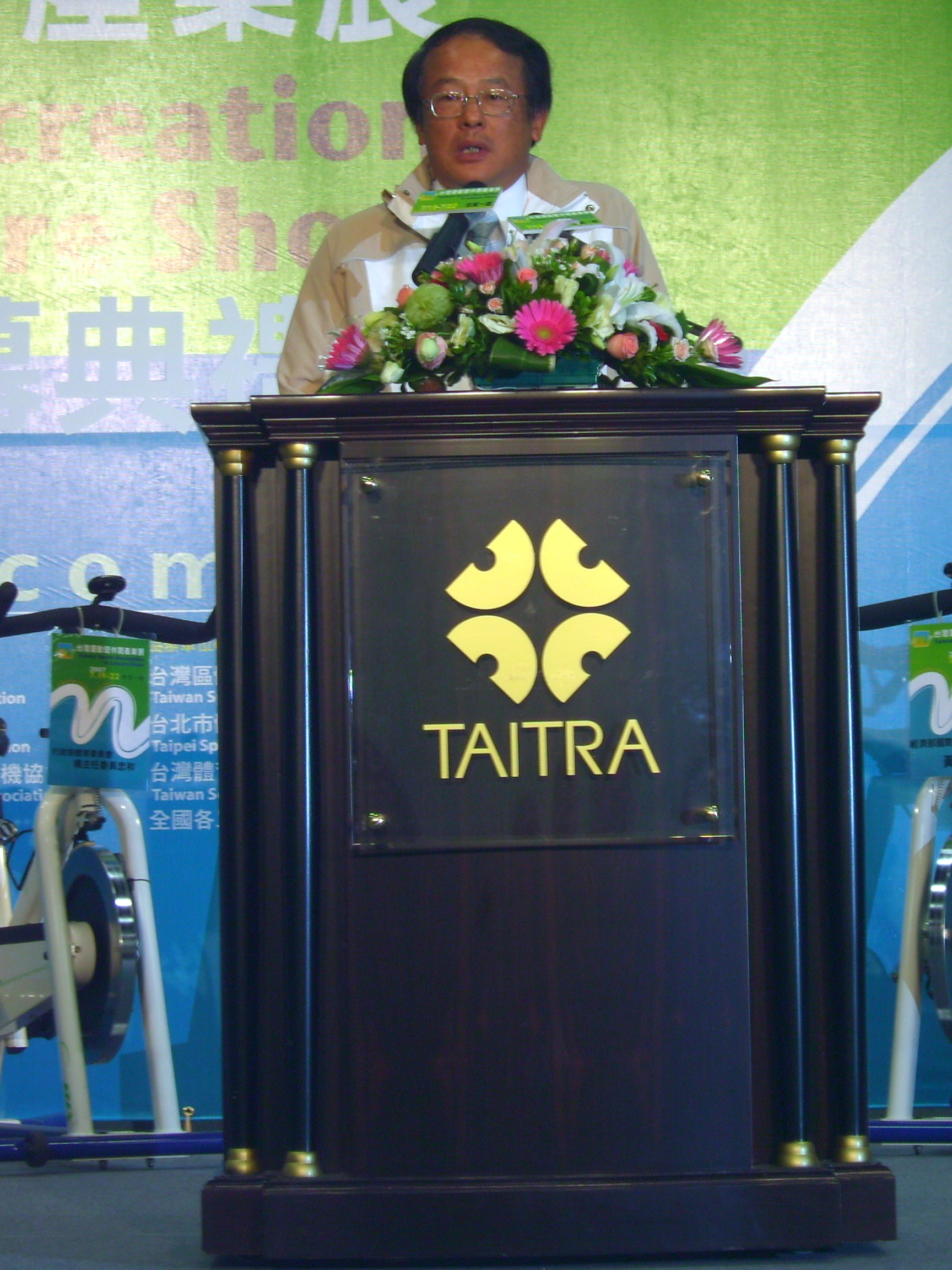
- Huang, Chih-Peng's in 2007
- Born: January 1, 1951 (age 75)
- Occupations: Representative at the Taipei Economic and Cultural Office, Hanoi, Vietnam, Ministry of Foreign Affairs

Huang Chih-peng (Chinese: 黃志鵬) is a Taiwanese politician who received a bachelor's degree from National Chengchi University, with a major in Public Finance. He is the former Administrator of International Affairs in the Ministry of Economic Affairs.
