= Kybernetes =

- Discipline: Information Management, Knowledge Management, Cybernetics, Systems Thinking
- Language: English
- Edited by: Steffen Roth and Augusto Sales

Publication details
- History: 1972-present
- Publisher: Emerald Group Publishing
- Frequency: 10/year
- Impact factor: 2.400 (2023)

Standard abbreviations
- ISO 4: Kybernetes

Indexing
- ISSN: 0368-492X

Links
- Journal homepage

Kybernetes :The international journal of cybernetics, systems and management sciences is a peer-reviewed scientific journal of information and knowledge management exploring the complex relationships between information systems and management theory and practice to determine how humans develop meaningful and satisfying roles in professional and organisational contexts. The journal was established in 1972 and it is published by Emerald Group Publishing.

== Abstracting and indexing ==
- Zentralblatt MATH
- Academic Search
- BIOSIS Previews
- DBLP
- Inspec
- Institute for Scientific Information
- The Chartered Association of Business Schools Academic Journal Guide
