= National Chengchi University =

University in Taipei, Taiwan

- 國立政治大學 (Chinese)
- Former names: Central Party Institute (1927–1929); Central Political Institute (1929–1937)
- Motto: 親愛精誠
- Motto in English: Harmony, Independence, Balance, and Preeminence
- Type: Public research university
- Established: 20 May 1927; 99 years ago
- Affiliations: AACSB; AALAU; EQUIS; APSIA; GBF; TBFA; UST
- Religious affiliation: Non-sectarian
- Endowment: NT$6.7 billion (US$224.1 million)
- President: Li Tsai-Yen
- Provost: Lin Chi-Ping
- Academic staff: 657
- Administrative staff: 170
- Students: 16,348
- Undergraduates: 9,400
- Postgraduates: 6,063
- Doctoral students: 885
- Location: Taipei, Taiwan; 24°59′13.17″N 121°34′30.80″E
- Campus: Suburban, 103 ha (250 acres)
- Language: Chinese and English
- Colors: Blue; Red; White
- Mascot: Griffin
- Website: nccu.edu.tw

Chinese name
- Traditional Chinese: 國立政治大學
- Simplified Chinese: 国立政治大学
Transcriptions
Standard Mandarin
- Hanyu Pinyin: Guólì Zhèngzhì Dàxué
- Wade–Giles: Kuo2-li4 Chêng4-chih4 Ta34-hsüeh2
Southern Min
- Hokkien POJ: Kok-li̍p Chèng-tī Tāi-ha̍k

Alternative Chinese name
- Traditional Chinese: 國立中央政治大學
- Simplified Chinese: 国立中央政治大学
Transcriptions
Standard Mandarin
- Hanyu Pinyin: Guólì Zhōngyāng Zhèngzhì Dàxué
- Wade–Giles: Kuo2-li4 Chung1-yang1 Chêng4-chih4 Ta4-hsüeh3
Southern Min
- Hokkien POJ: Kok-li̍p Tiong-iong Chèng-tī Tāi-ha̍k

Central School of Governance
- Traditional Chinese: 中央政治學校
- Simplified Chinese: 中央政治学校
Transcriptions
Standard Mandarin
- Hanyu Pinyin: Zhōngyāng Zhèngzhì Xuéxiào
- Wade–Giles: Chung1-yang1 Chêng4-chih4 Hsüeh3-hsiao4
Southern Min
- Hokkien POJ: Tiong-iong Chèng-tī Ha̍k-hāu

Central School of Cadre
- Traditional Chinese: 中央幹部學校
- Simplified Chinese: 中央干部学校
Transcriptions
Standard Mandarin
- Hanyu Pinyin: Zhōngyāng Gànbù Xuéxiào
- Wade–Giles: Chung1-yang1 Kan4-pu4 Hsüeh3-hsiao4
Southern Min
- Hokkien POJ: Tiong-iong Kàn-pō͘ Ha̍k-hāu

National Chengchi University (NCCU; Chinese: 國立政治大學; pinyin: Guólì Zhèngzhì Dàxué) is a public research university in Taipei, Taiwan.

The university was founded in Nanjing, China, in 1927 as a training institution for officials in the National Government of the Republic of China. After the Chinese Civil War, it was relocated to Taiwan in 1954 as the first reestablished national university.

The university has an urban campus of approximately 103 hectares (250 acres) in the Wenshan District and provides undergraduate and graduate instruction with a specialization in the arts and humanities and social sciences. It consists of twelve colleges, such as the College of Commerce and College of Foreign Languages, in addition to 34 departments and ten research institutes that host 43 master's programs, 34 doctoral programs, and multiple international degree programs.

== History ==
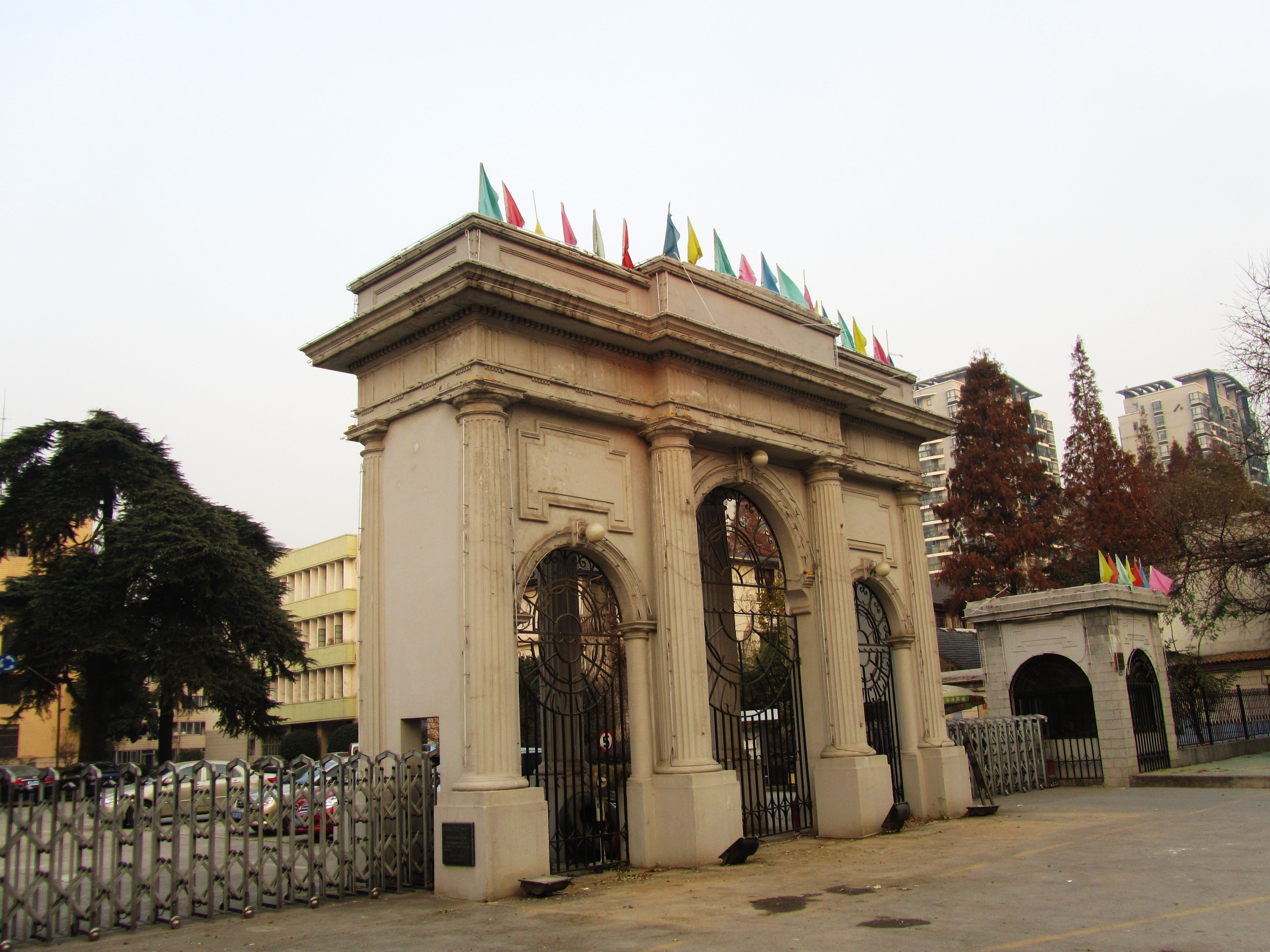
Heritage Campus Gate of the National Political University in Nanjing

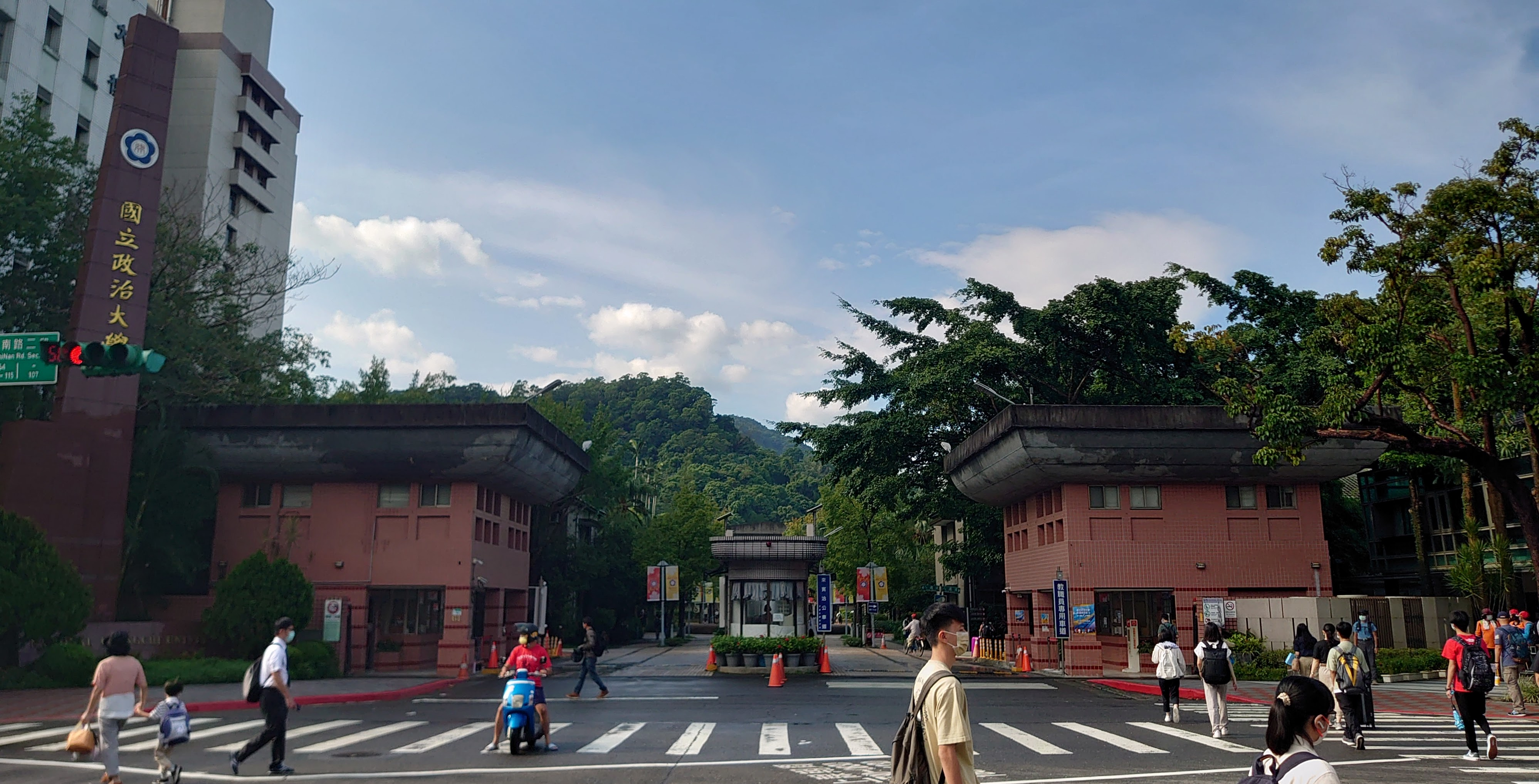
Campus Gate of National Chengchi University in Taipei

The school was established in 1927 in Nanjing, which was the capital city of China, as the Kuomintang (Nationalist Party of China) Central School of Party Affairs (中央黨務學校) to train Party cadre. In 1929, it was renamed the Central Political Institute (中央政治學校), after the Kuomintang reunified much of China in the Northern Expedition. The school was built on the basis of National Central University, which was the highest academic institution of the Republic of China. In 1946, it merged with the Central Youth Cadre School (中央青年幹部学校), which had been founded in 1943 by the Three Principles of the People Youth Corps in the wartime capital of Chongqing. The merged school was named the National Political University (國立政治大學, aka the National Central Political University [國立中央政治大學]) and was based again in Nanjing. When the Nationalist government lost control of mainland China and relocated to Taiwan in 1949, the university's activities were suspended.

The university was reopened in 1954 as National Chengchi University (Note: The romanization "Chengchi" (for 政治) gradually replaced the English "Political" in the English name of the university.) in the Muzha District of Taipei by the Executive Yuan, in order to meet the needs of civil service and the growing demands of higher education in Taiwan. It became a pioneer for the subsequent restoration in Taiwan of other national universities from China, such as Tsing Hua and Chiao Tung universities. Initially, only graduate students were admitted, but later in 1955, the school began to offer places to undergraduate students. In 1960, the university awarded the very first Doctor of Juridical Science degree in the Republic of China. In 1964, the school initiated the first-ever Mandarin-based Chinese Master of Business Administration program in the world.

Traditionally, as a modern institution training for public servants, NCCU is considered one of the leading institutions in Taiwan. Today, the school is one of the top universities in Taiwan, and has been elected as the Aim for the Top University Project sponsored school of the Ministry of Education.

In 2014, the Representative Office of Japan in Taiwan listed NCCU as one of the seven well-known Taiwanese universities.

In December 2019, NCCU established its first overseas office in Bangkok, Thailand.

== Organization ==
NCCU has 12 colleges, including colleges of Commerce, Communication, Foreign Languages and Literature, Education, International Affairs, Law, Liberal Arts, Science, Social Sciences, International Innovation, Global Banking and Finance and Informatics, encompassing 34 departments and 48 graduate institutes.

- The College of Commerce is ranked as a five palmes universal business school by Eduniversal and is accredited by the Association to Advance Collegiate Schools of Business and the European Quality Improvement System. In addition, the college is a member of The Partnership in International Management.
- The College of Foreign Languages and Literature offers distinctive academic programs on Slavic languages and literature, Arabic languages and literature and Turkish language and culture. Arabic languages and literature and Turkish language and culture are the faculties which exist only in NCCU in Taiwan. Dual degrees in Korean language with Sungkyunkwan University and Hanyang University have been offered since 2013. The college also is awarded by the Academy of Korean Studies for the "Core University Program for Korean Studies" and receive support from the government of the Republic of Korea.
- The College of International Affairs is affiliated with the Association of Professional Schools of International Affairs, with specializations in international relations, East Asian studies and Russian studies.
- The Institute of International Relations is one of the top think tanks in the Asia-Pacific area.
- Founded together with the University of Michigan, the Center for Public and Business Administration Education provides training for managers in public and private institutions.
- The Department of Diplomacy is the only one of its kind in a university in Taiwan.
- NCCU has recently engaged in the fields of information technology and natural science cooperating with Academia Sinica, National Tsinghua University, and the Ministry of Finance.
- In addition to accredited educational partnerships, NCCU students have access to multiple industry partnerships for internships and on-the-job learning.
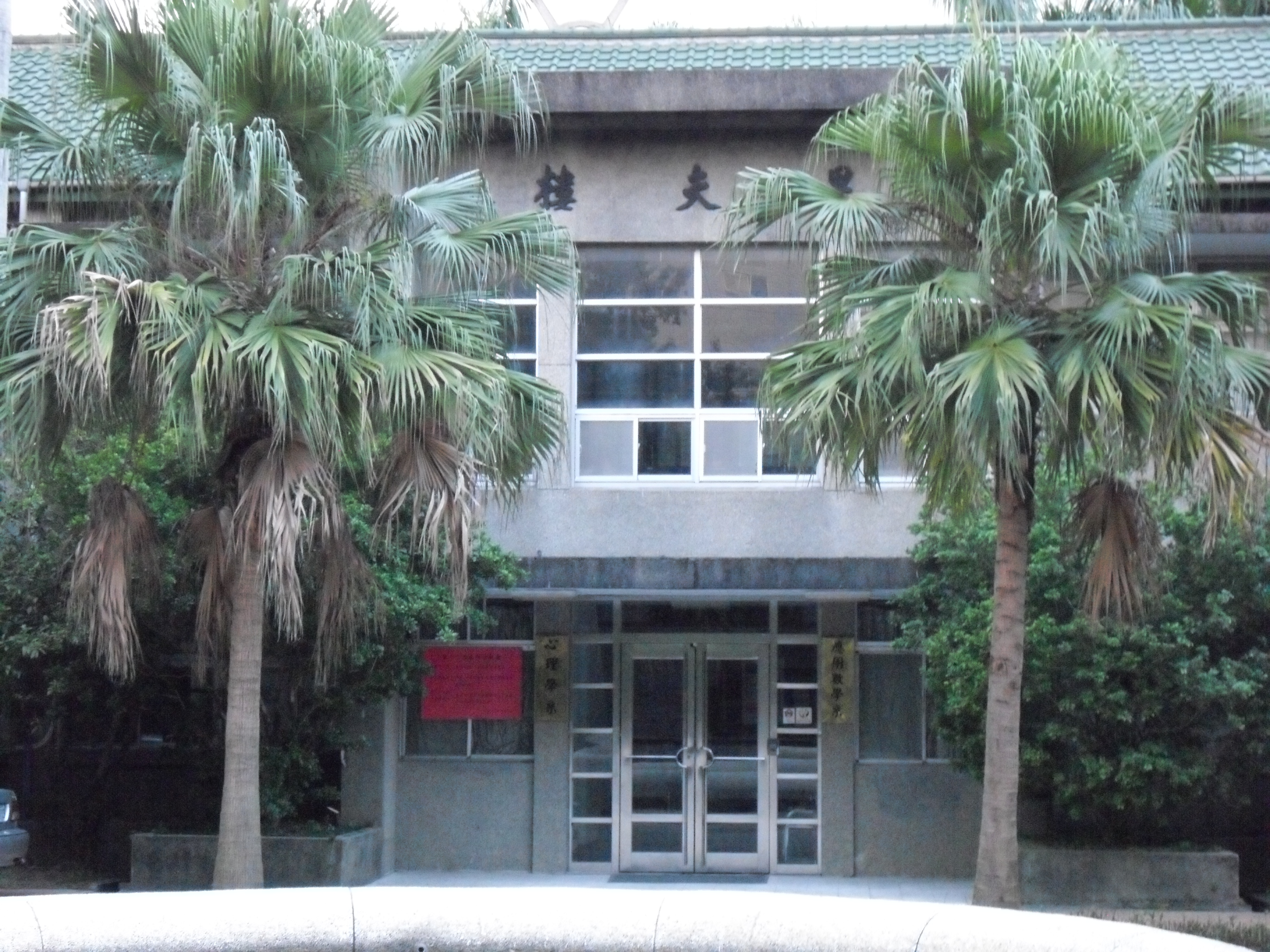
College of Science

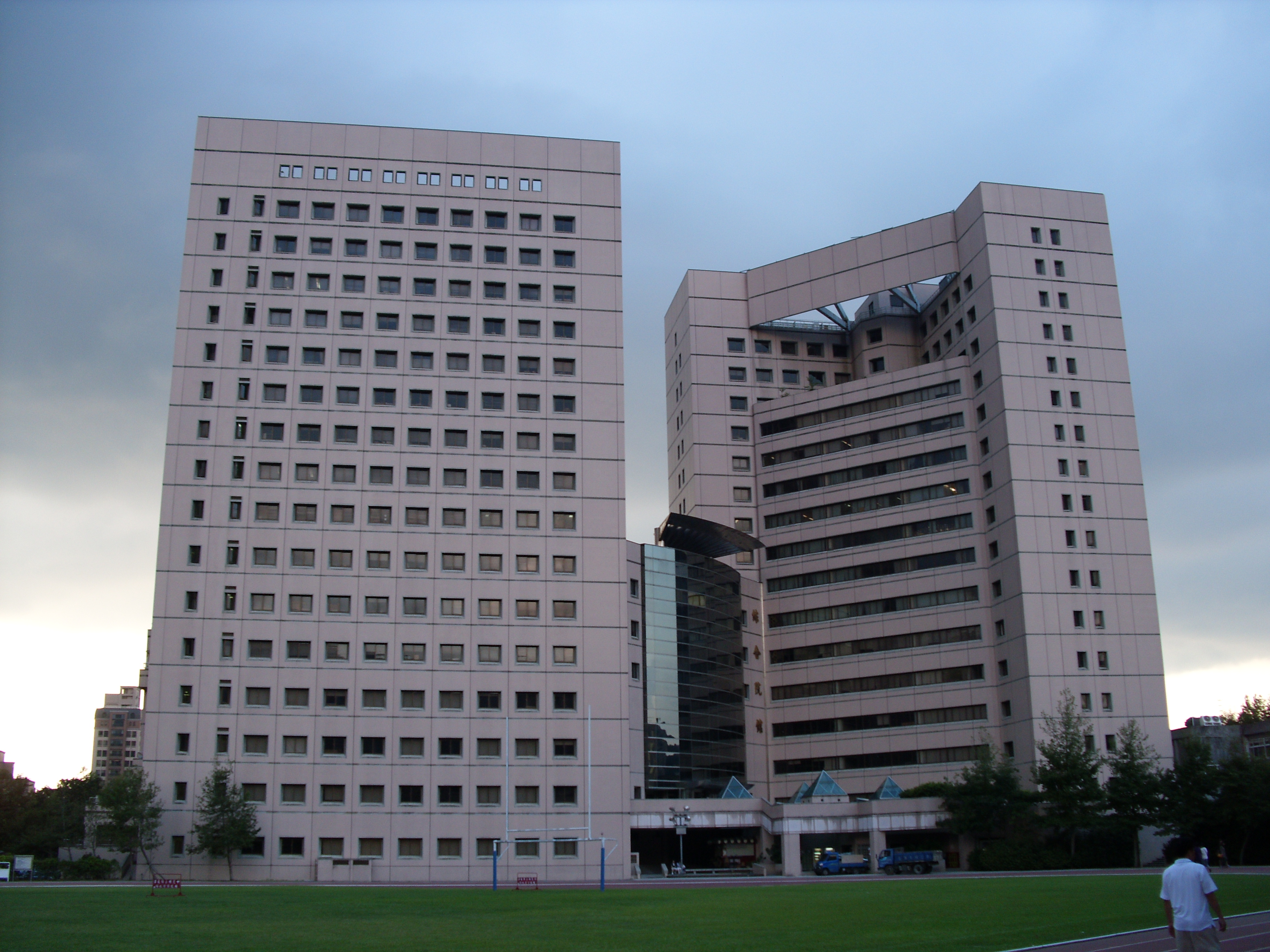
College of Social Sciences, College of Law and College of International Affairs

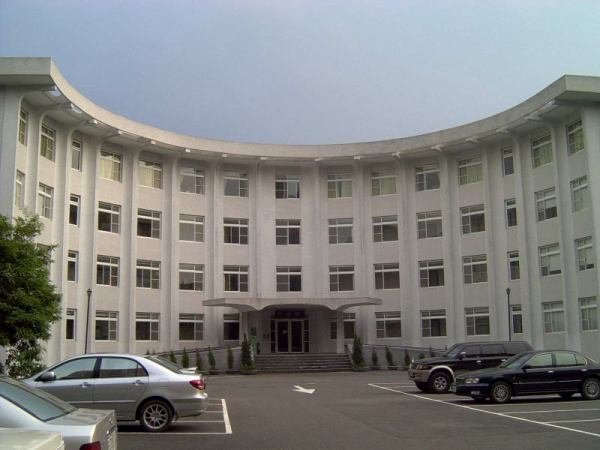
College of Education

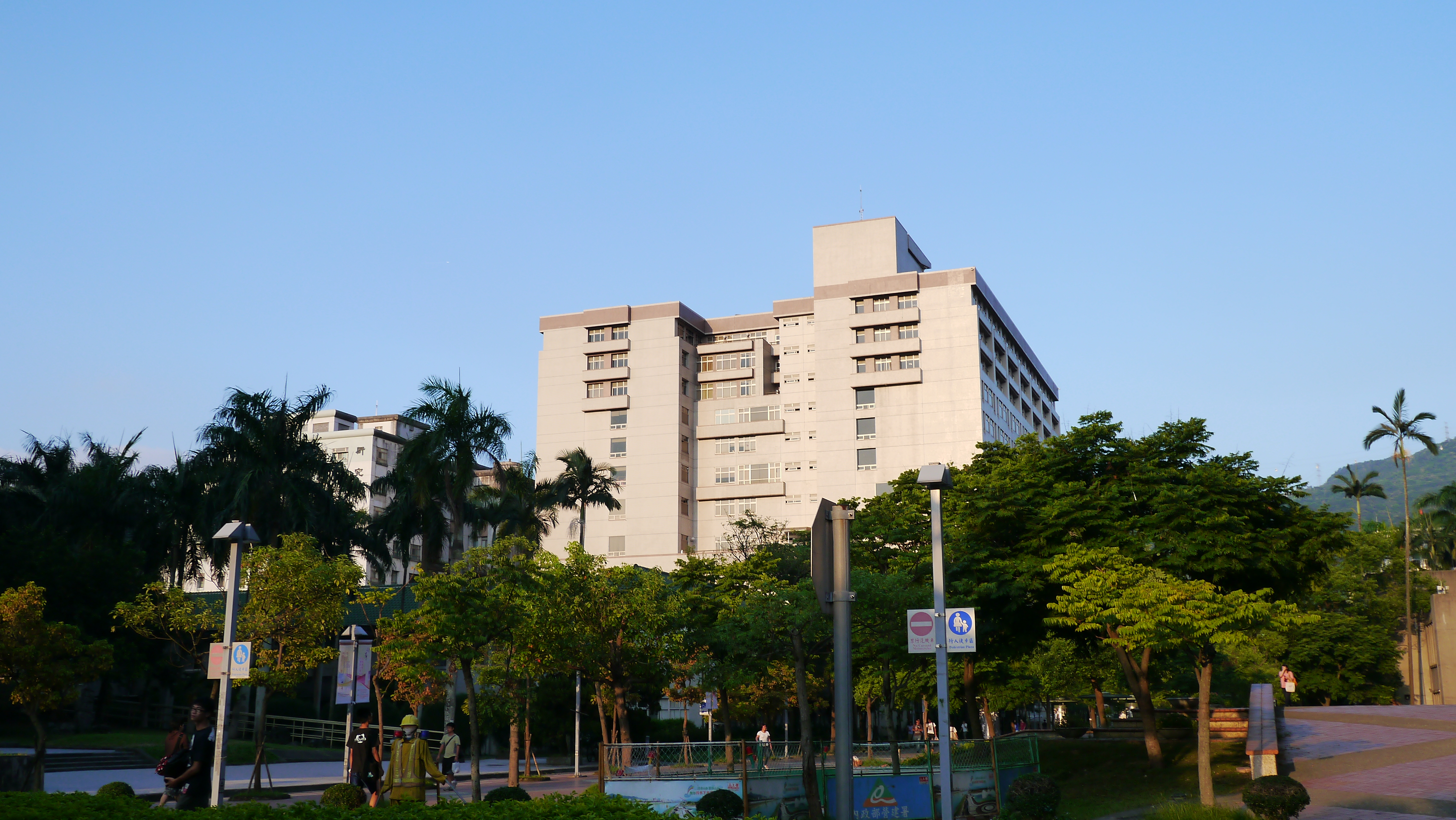
College of Commerce

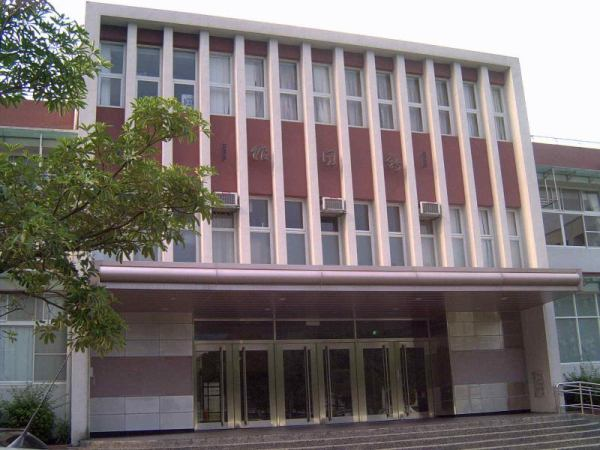
College of Communication

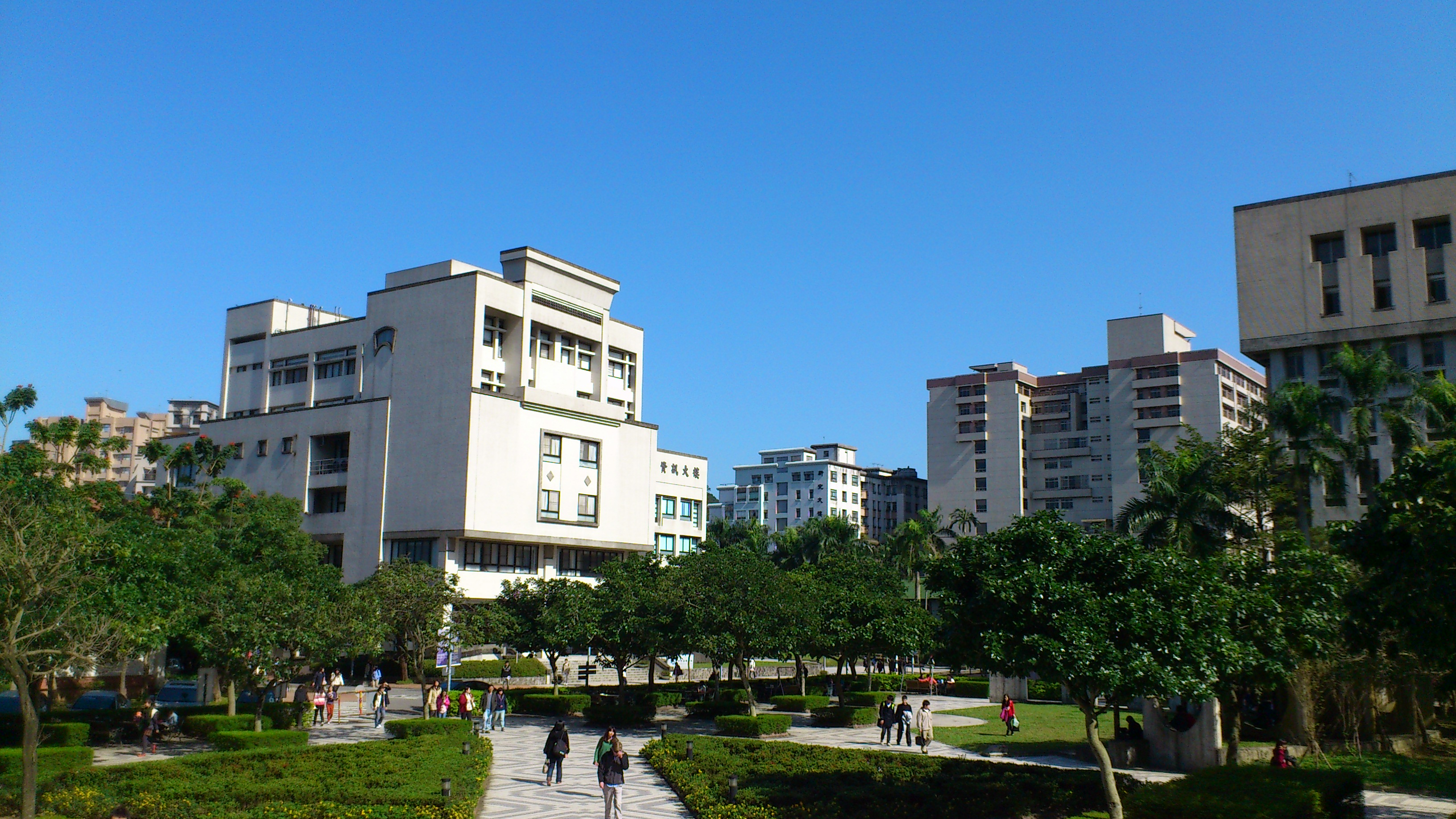
Computer Center

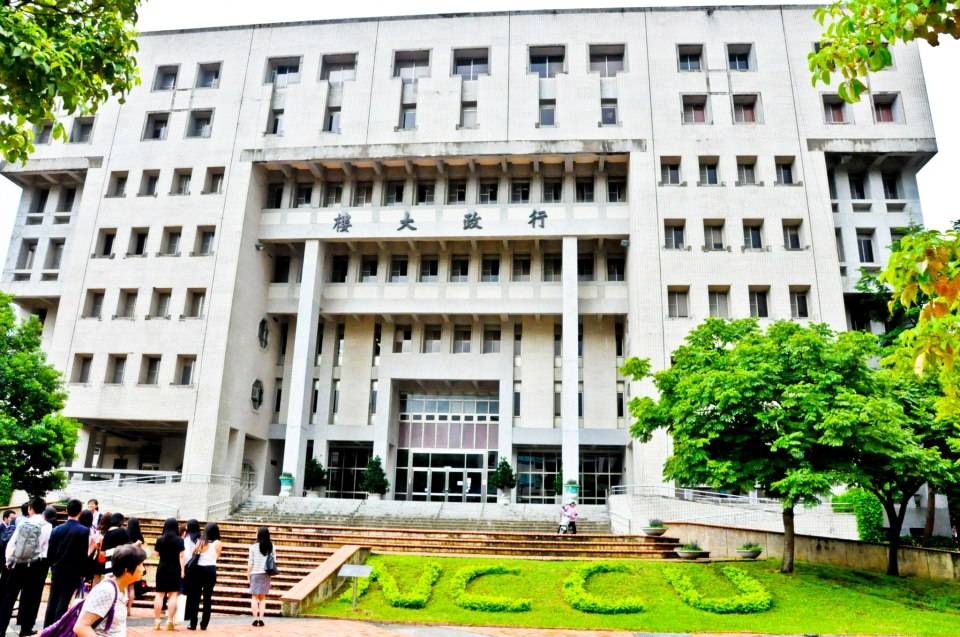
Administration Building

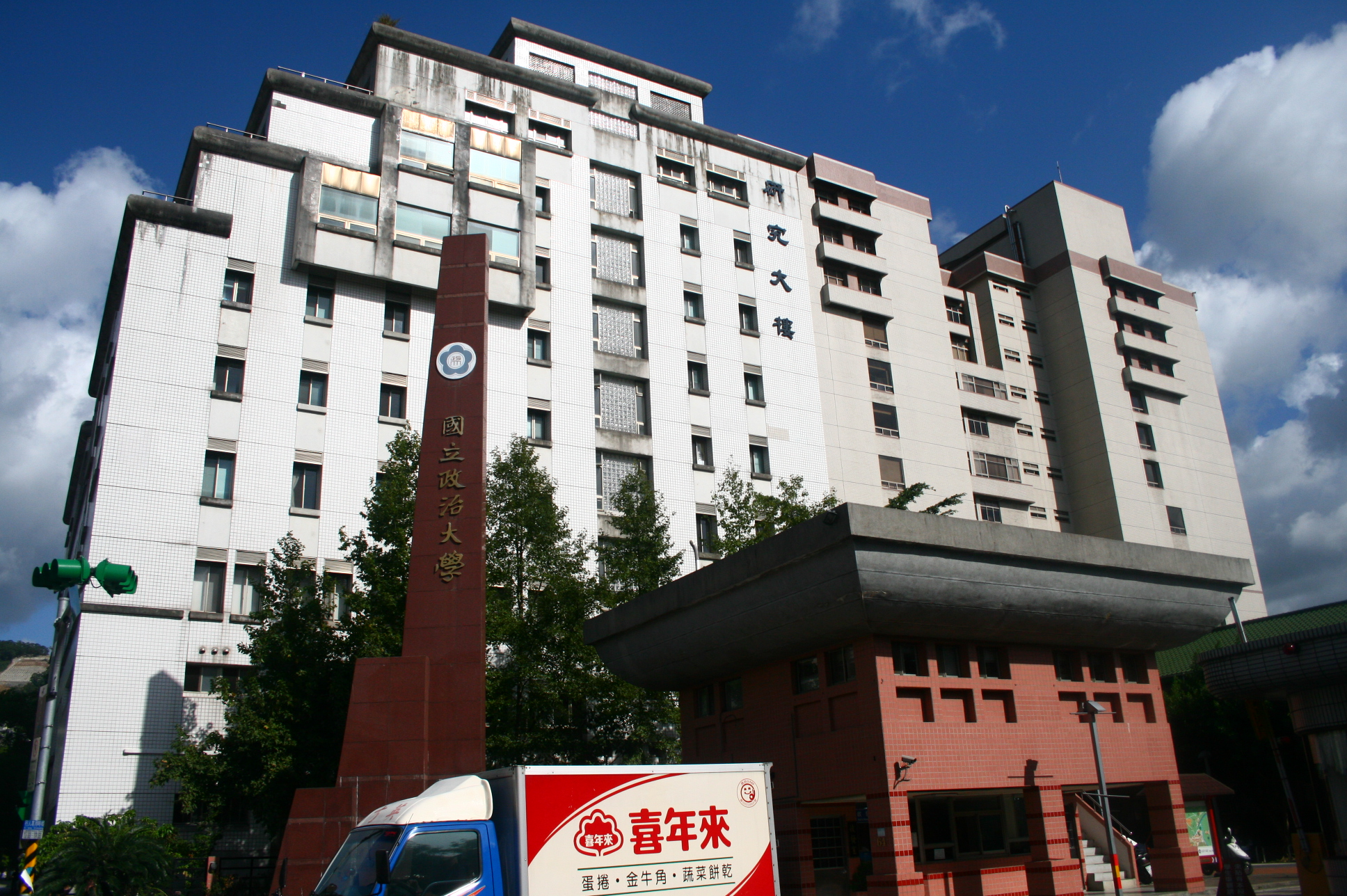
Research Building

== Campuses ==
NCCU's main campus is in the Wenshan District, in the southern part of Taipei. NCCU was awarded the first prize in the Taipei Urban Landscape Award for its campus planning by the city government of Taipei.

Apart from the main campus, there are two branch campuses:

- Hua Nan Campus (化南校區), which includes Hua Nan Village and International House.
- Zhi Nan Campus (指南校區), which includes Dah Hsian Library and Institute of International Relations.
- The Public & Business Administration Education Center(公企中心) on Jinhua Street (金華街) in Daan District. (大安區)

The affiliated schools are:

- Preschool on Section 2, Zhinan Road. (指南路)
- Experimental Elementary School on Section 3, Zhinan Road. (指南路)
- The Affiliated High School on Zhengda First Street. (政大一街)
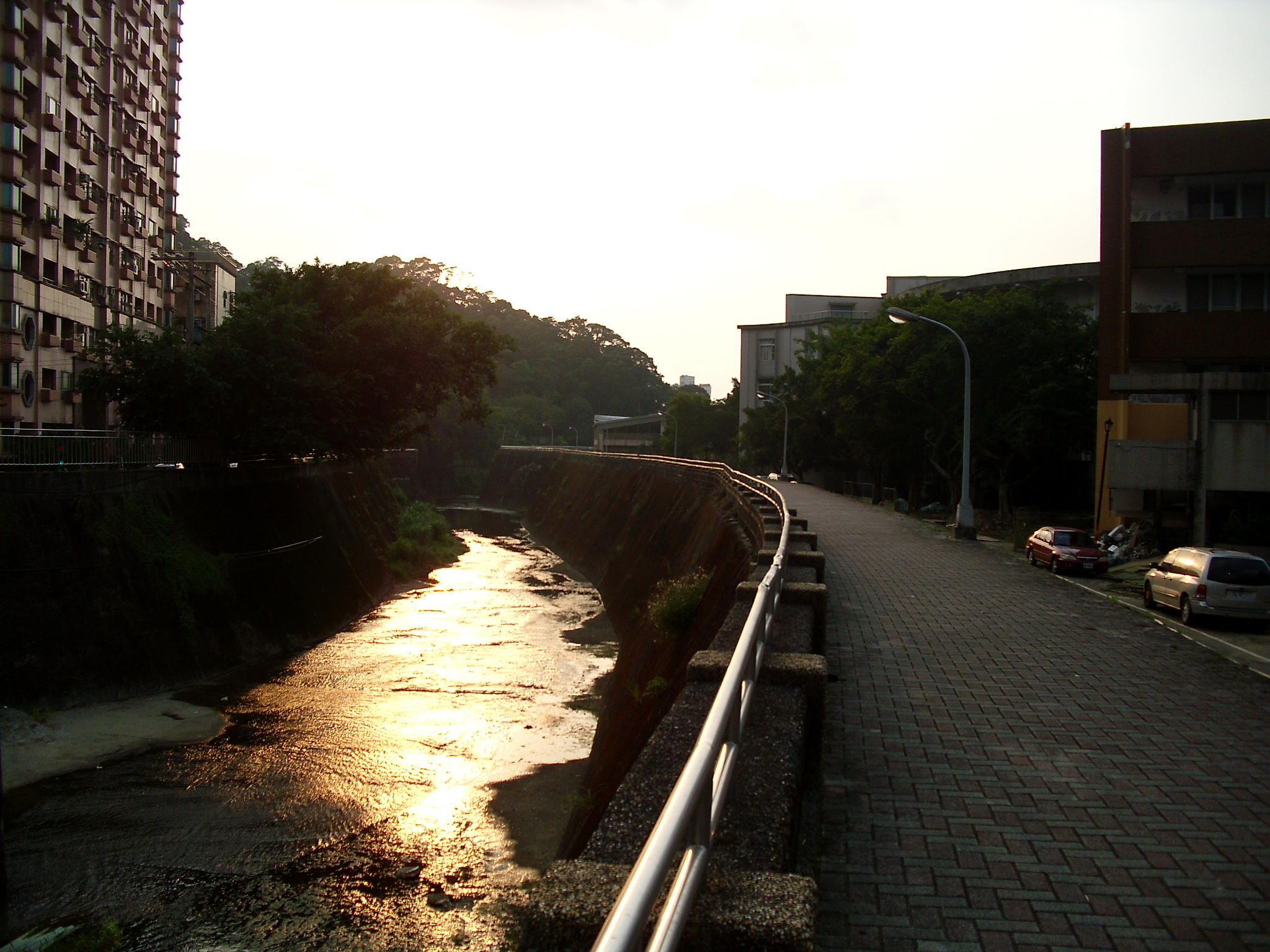
  Sunset view from campus
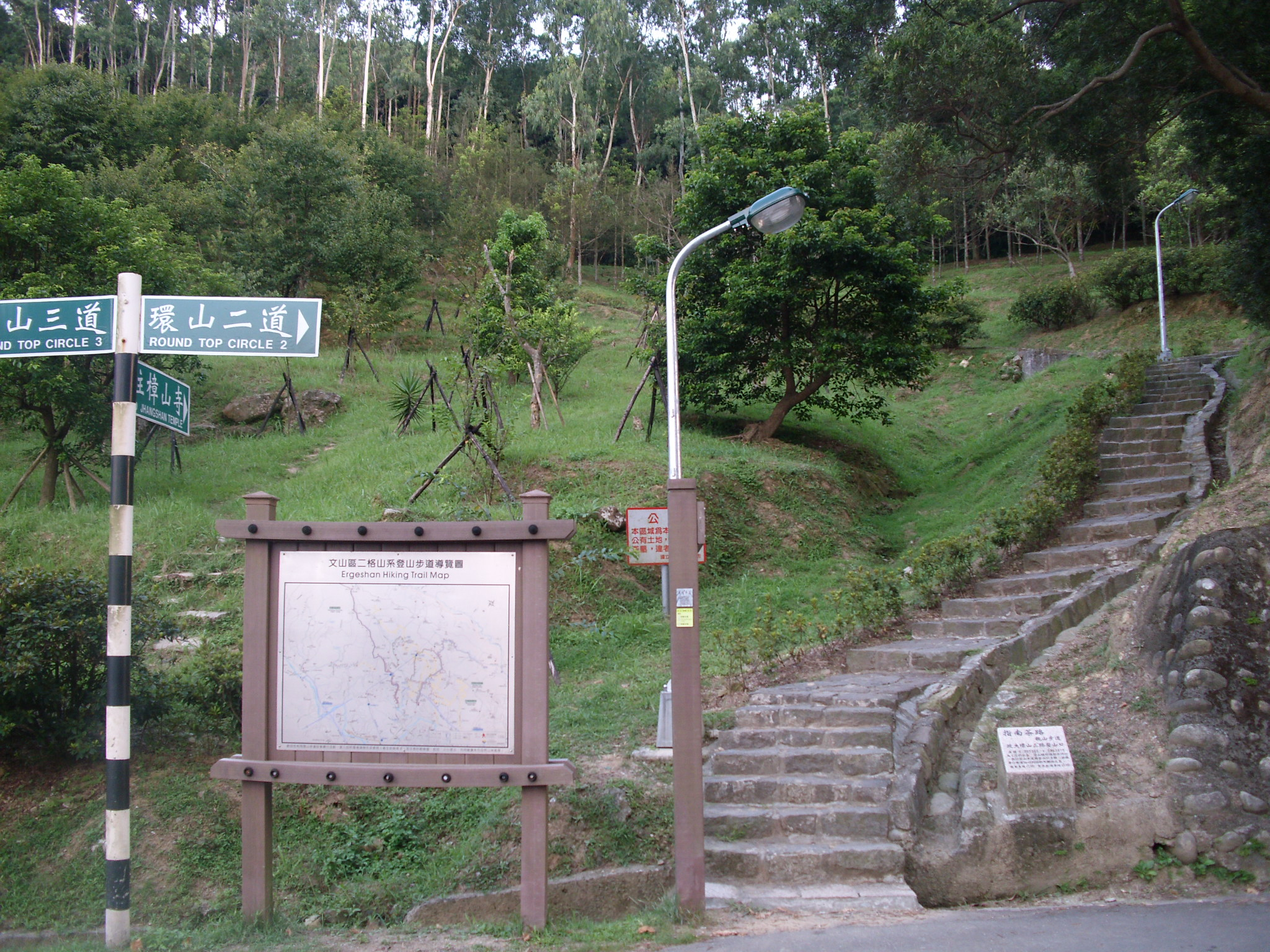
  Uphill Campus Way
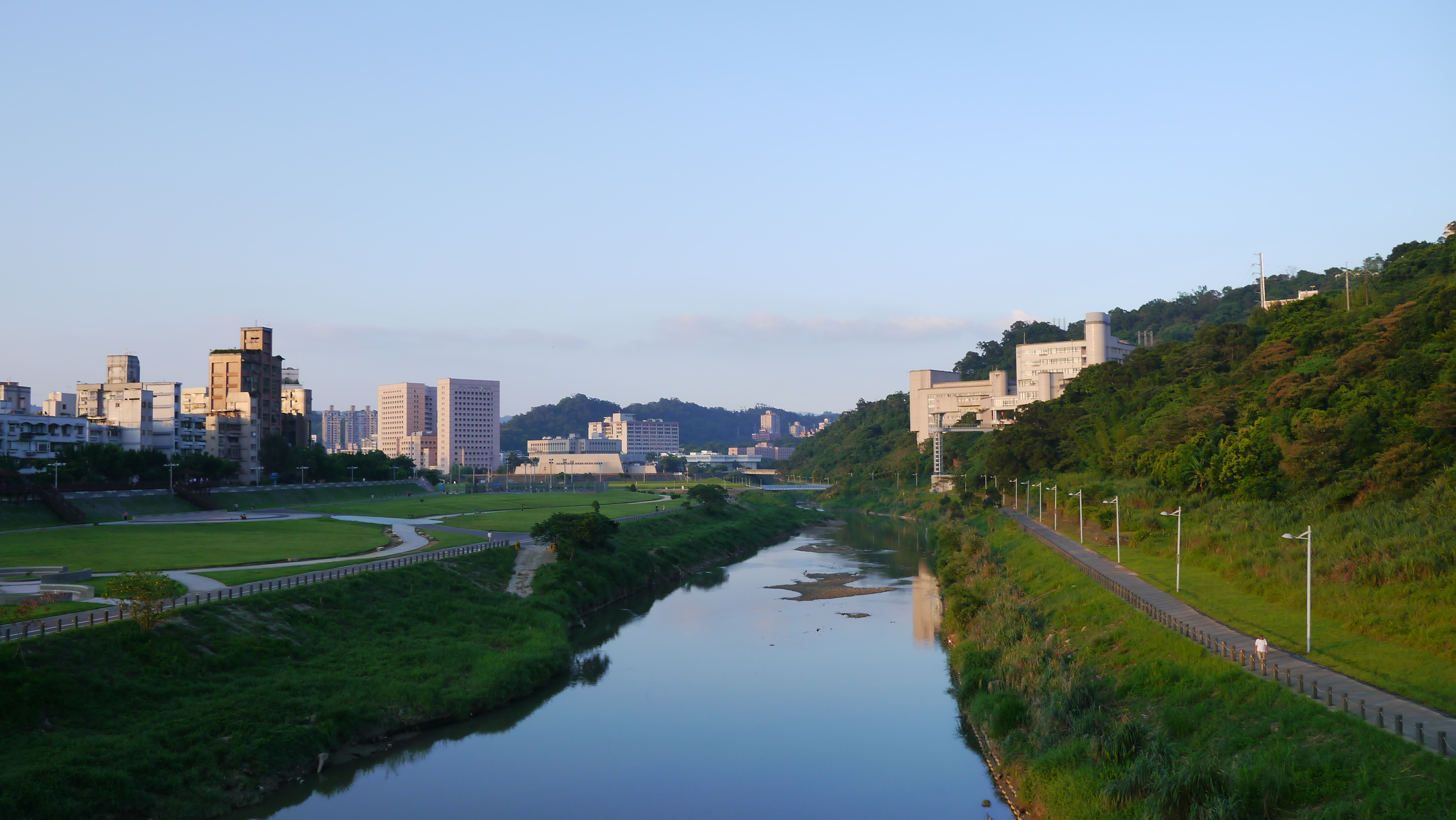
  Riverside view of campus
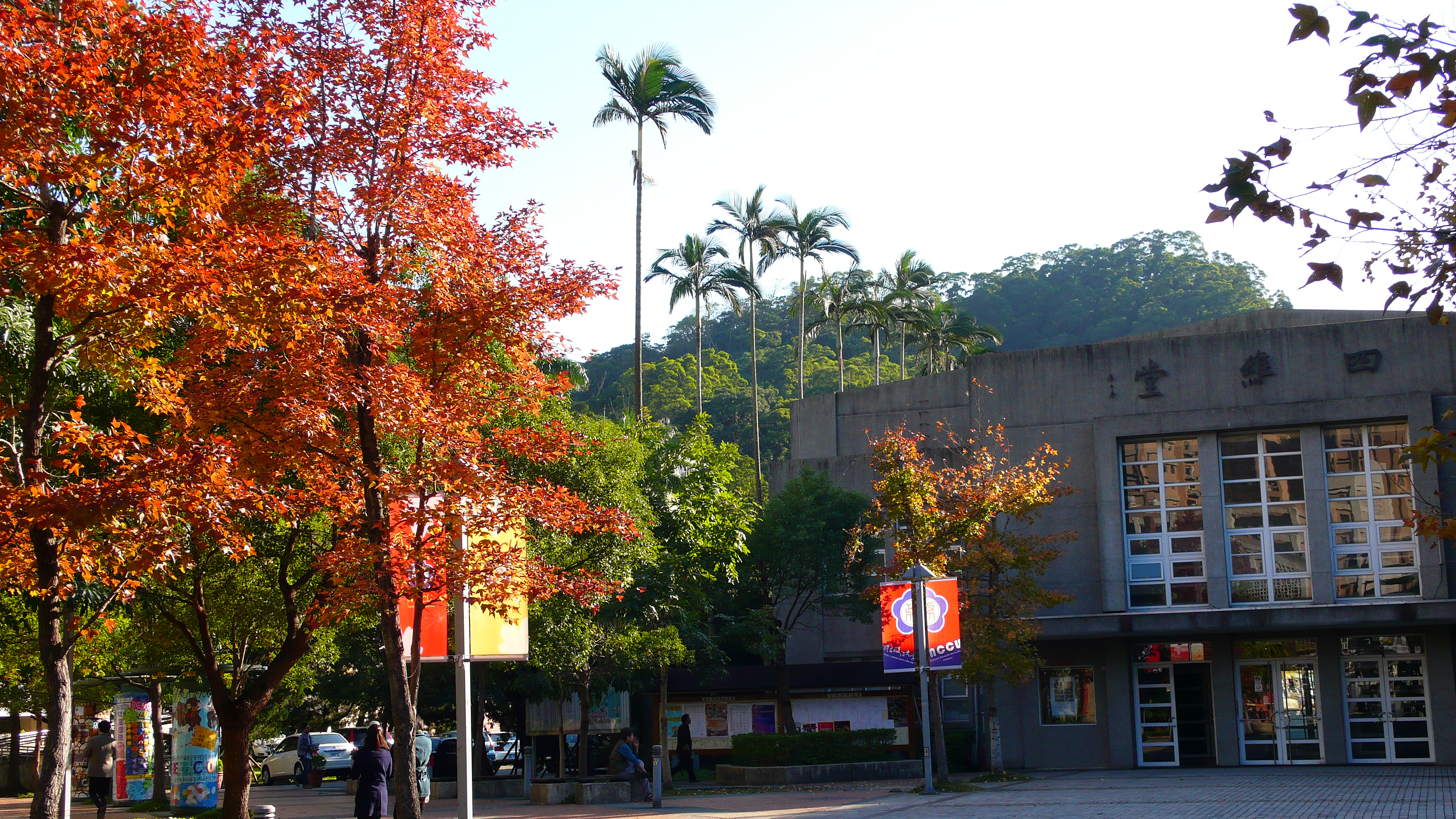
  Autumn view of campus

== Libraries, exhibition space, and sports centers ==
There are six libraries on the main campus and one library in the Center for Public and Business Affairs Education.

=== Libraries ===
- Chiang Kai-shek Library
  - College of Commerce Library
  - College of Social Science Library
  - College of Communication Library
  - Institute of International Relation Library
- Dah Hsian Seetoo Library
- Social Science Information Canter and Sun Yat-sen Memorial Library
- Center for Public and Business Affairs Education Library (Under construction)

=== Museum and Arts Center ===
- Siwei Tang Auditorium (四維堂)
- Museum of Ethnology
- NCCU Arts Center
- Exhibition of Future Planning at Main Research Center
- Roman Forum (羅馬廣場)

=== Sports Centers ===
- Main Sports Center
- Swimming Center
- Tennis Court
- Track and Field Stadium
- Riverside Park
- Health Park
- Sports Park
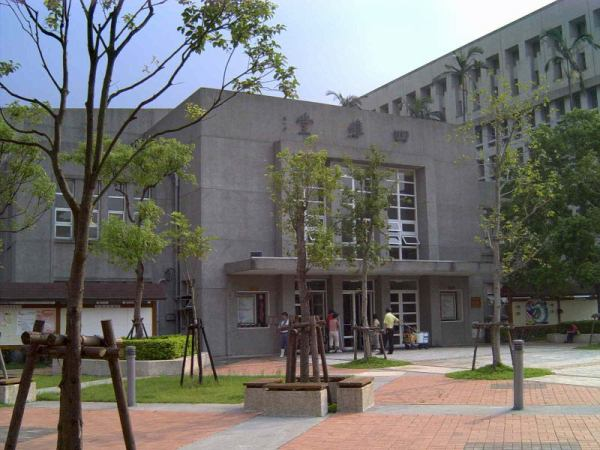
  Siwei Tang Auditorium (四維堂)
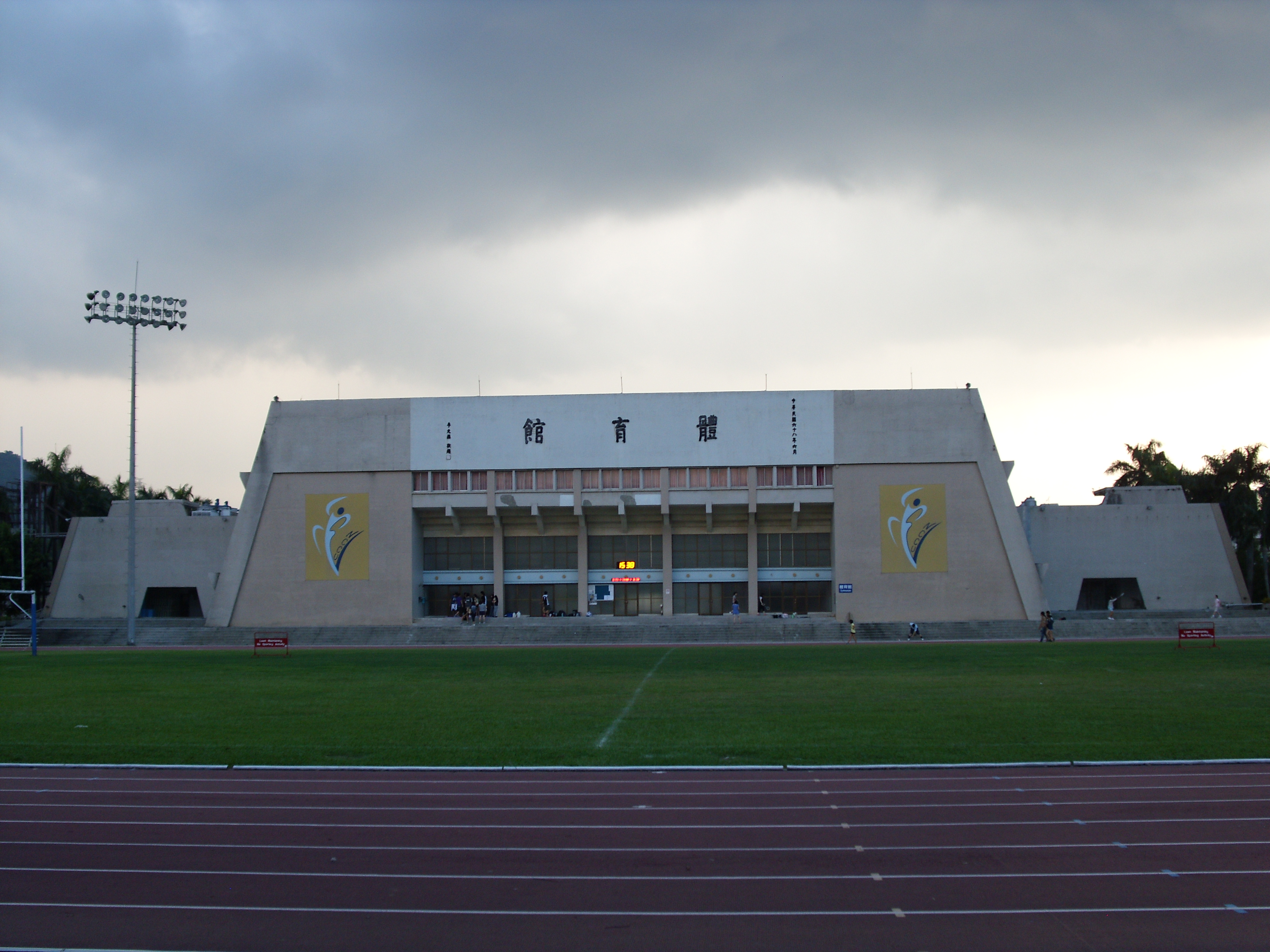
  Sports Center
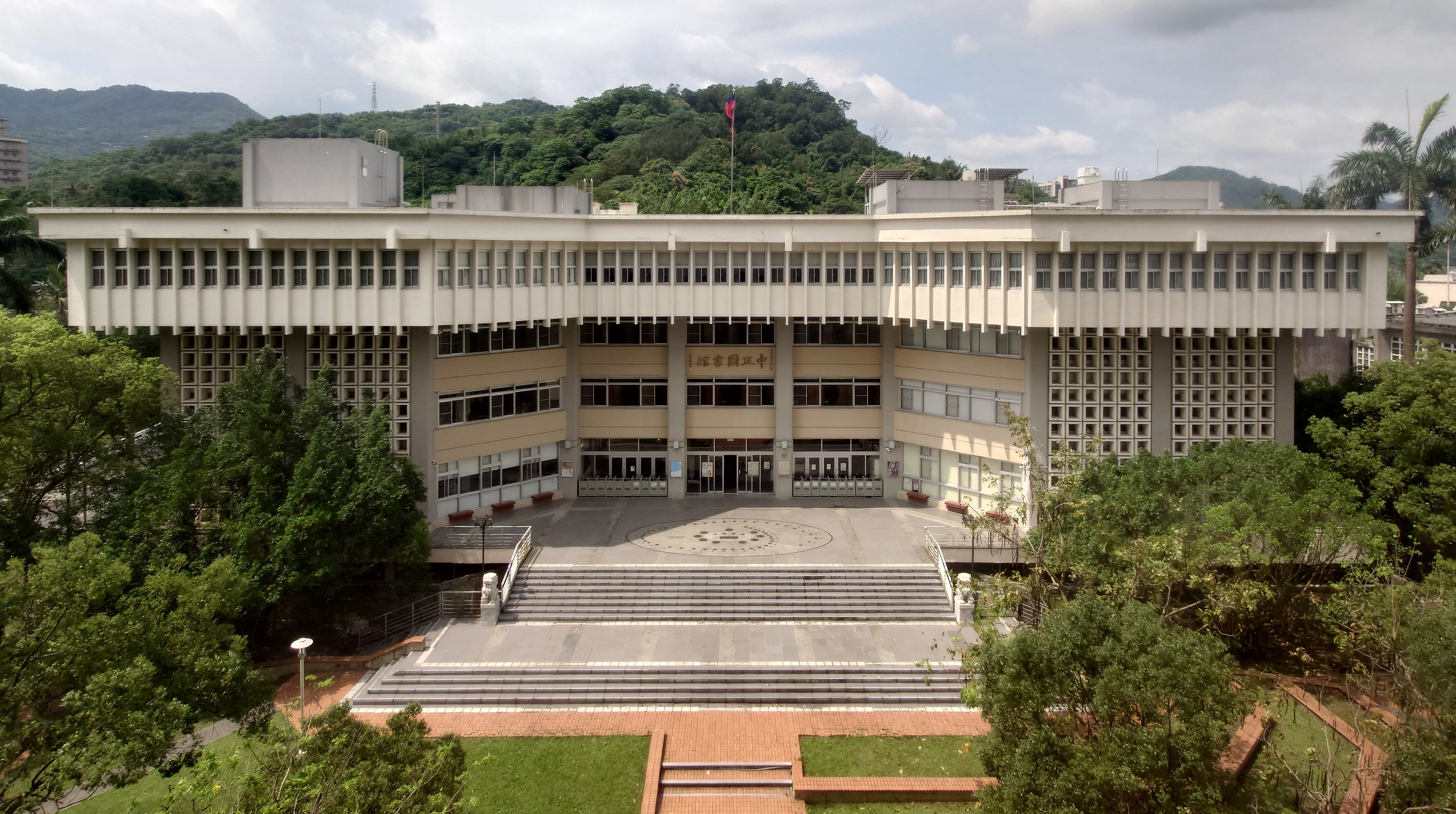
  Main Library
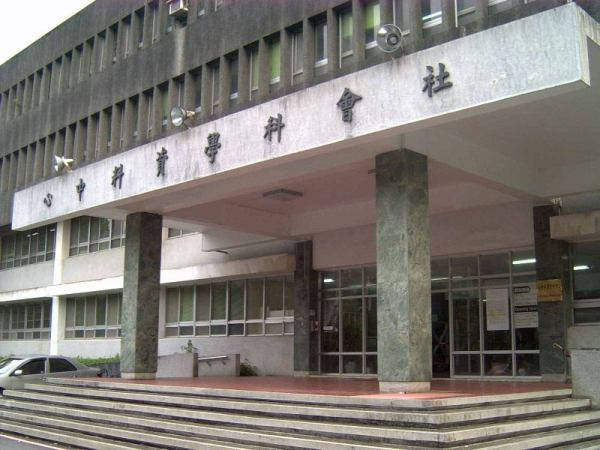
  Social Sciences Information Center
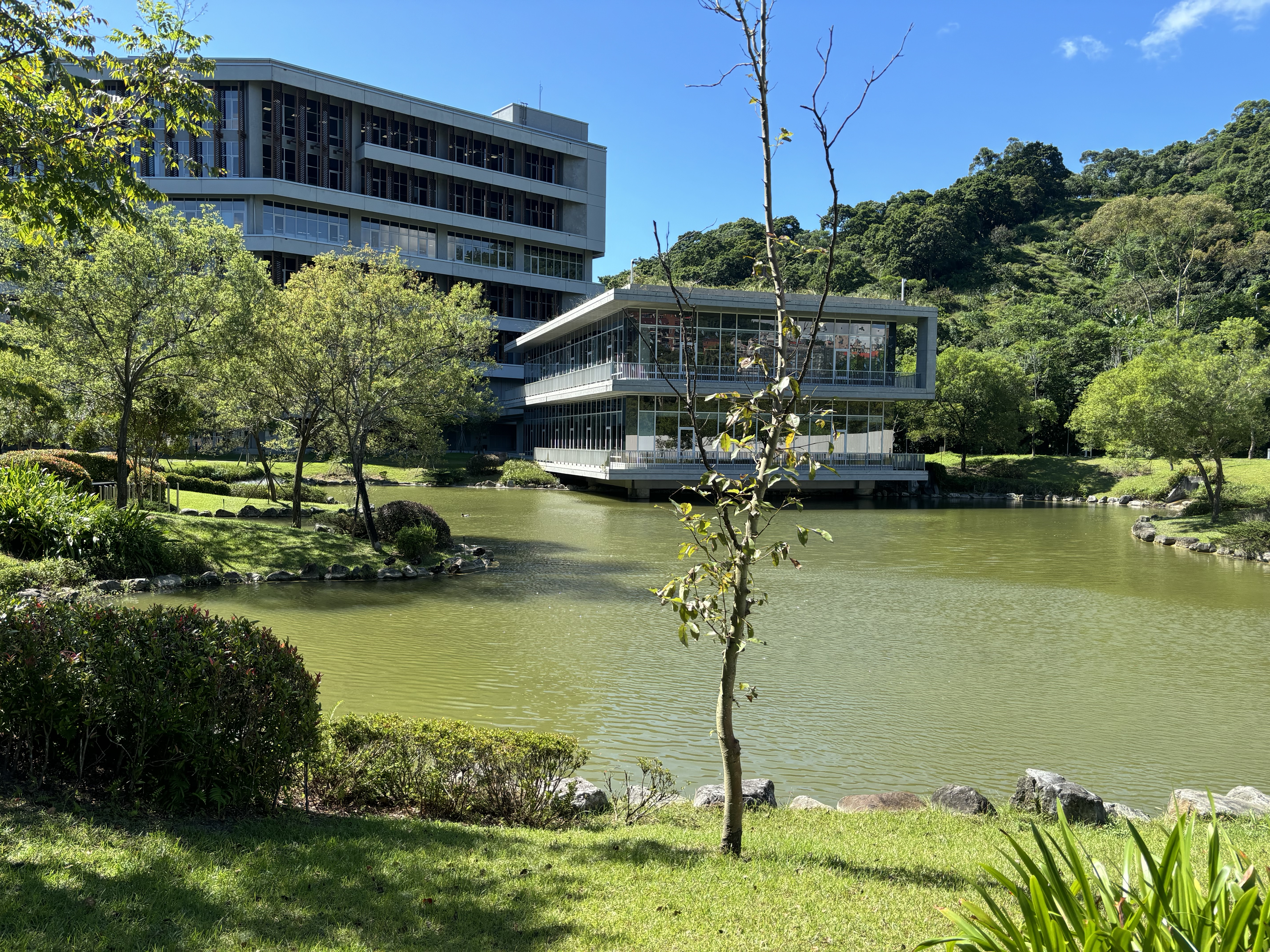
  Dah Hsian Seetoo Library

== Campus media ==
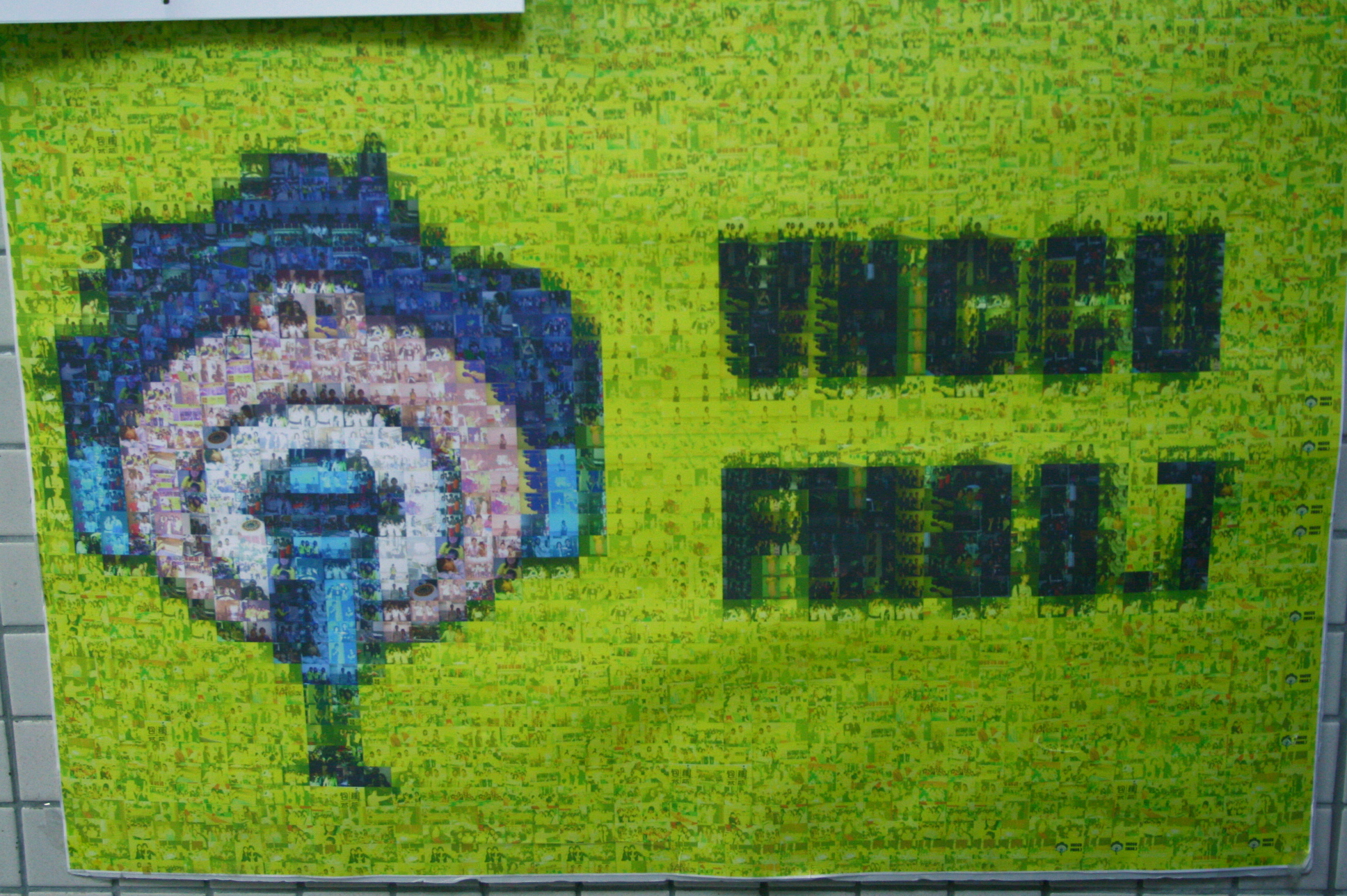
Voice of NCCU

There is an academic press, a community radio station, and a local newspaper agency located in NCCU.

- Chengchi University Press
- Voice of NCCU
- University News

== Partnership with Healthcare Systems ==
In cooperation with the Taipei City Hospital System and National Yang Ming Chiao Tung University, the three institutions formed a healthcare system covering medical education, healthcare, and management.

=== NCCU Health Building ===
- Ground Level: Taipei City Hospital ChengDa Clinic
- Second Level: NCCU healthcare center
- Third Level: NCCU consulting center

== International programs ==
NCCU provides a series of international programs taught in English.

NCCU participates in the Social Networks and Human-Centered Computing Program of the Taiwan International Graduate Program of Academia Sinica, Taiwan's most preeminent academic research institution.

== Rankings ==
University rankings

Global – Overall
- QS World: =604 (2026)
- THE World: 1001-1200 (2024)
- USNWR Global: 1959 (2025)

Regional – Overall
- QS Asia: 123 (2025)
- THE Asia: 351-400 (2025)

== Notable alumni ==
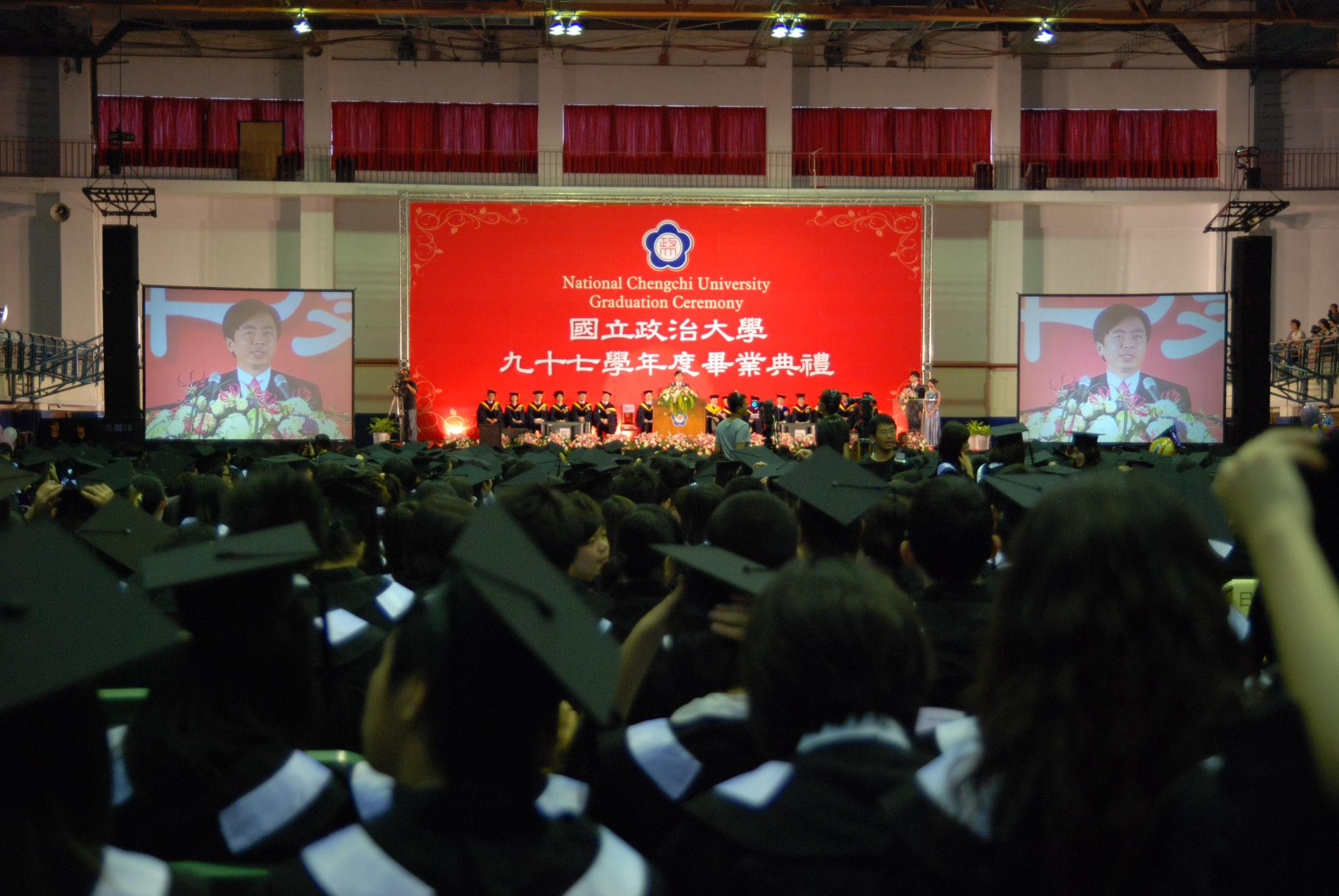
2009 Commencement Ceremony

Many NCCU alumni hold prominent positions in the fields of politics, finance, academics, and the arts, including a vice president, a premier, and a provincial governor. At least four Academicians of Academia Sinica were educated at NCCU. NCCU alumni also include Olympic Games gold medalists. The following is a list of notable alumni.

- Vincent Siew: Vice President of the Republic of China (2008-2012)
- Jason Hu, Mayor of Taichung
- Hsu Hsin-liang, former Chairman of the Democratic Progressive Party
- Chiang Wan-an, Mayor of Taipei
- Lin Chuan: Premier of the Republic of China (2016-17)
- Yang Chin-long: Governor of the Central Bank of the Republic of China
- Huang Tien-mu: Chair of the Financial Supervisory Commission of the Republic of China
- Lee Yung-te: Minister of Culture of the Republic of China
- James Soong: Governor of Taiwan Province (1993-98)
- Lu Shiow-yen: Mayor of Taichung City
- Ovid Tzeng: Linguist, Academicians of Academia Sinica, Minister of Education of the Republic of China (2000-02)
- Ambrose King: Sociologist, Academicians of Academia Sinica, Vice-Chancellor of the Chinese University of Hong Kong (2002-04)
- Chang Yu-sheng: singer
- Matilda Tao: singer, TV host
- Sandee Chan: Golden Melody Award winning singer and producer
- Cheer Chen: singer
- Ariel Lin: actress
- Cindy Lee: Retired Canadian CEO of T & T Supermarket 1993-2014
- Huang Chih-peng: politician
- Tuhi Martukaw: journalist and diplomat
- Wu Tsing-Feng: singer and lyricist
- Douglas Hung, member of the Legislative Yuan
- Hsieh Wen-cheng, member of the Legislative Yuan

=== Alumni Network ===
NCCU has several hubs globally for students and teachers of NCCU to stay in touch and connect with each other. In 2020, the world alumni association has been established to serve about 140,000 alumni globally.

| Greater China | Asia and Oceania | America and Europe |
|---|---|---|
| Republic of China (Taiwan); China; Hong Kong; Macau | South Korea; Singapore; Japan; Thailand; Malaysia; Indonesia; Australia | Canada; United States; Brazil; United Kingdom; France; Belgium |

=== President of the Republic of China ===
- Chiang Kai-shek: Founder president of the university.
- Chiang Ching-kuo: Executive of Central School of Cadre.
- Lee Teng-hui: Lecturer of Graduate Institute of East Asian Studies.
- Ma Ying-jeou: Associate Professor of Department of Law
- Tsai Ing-wen: Associate Professor of Department of Law

=== Vice President of the Republic of China ===
- Li Yuan-tsu: Class of 1946, Central School of Governance
- Vincent Siew: Class of 1965, Department of Diplomacy

== Partnership ==
NCCU is a member institution of University System of Taiwan. Globally, NCCU has maintained partnership with more than 470 academic institutions, including exchange students programs, visiting scholar programs, and academic cooperation programs.

== See also ==
- List of schools in the Republic of China reopened in Taiwan
- Central Party School of the Chinese Communist Party
- Tsinghua Big Five Alliance
- Chinese Academy of Governance
- Chinese Communist Party
- Kuomintang
- Nanjing Library
- Nanjing University
- Renmin University of China
- Republic of China Military Academy
- Second Historical Archives of China
