= NCCU College of Foreign Languages and Literature =

Coordinates: 24°59′13.17″N 121°34′30.80″E

NCCU College of Foreign Languages and Literature (NCCU CFLL)
- 國立政治大學外國語文學院
- Type: A college of NCCU
- Established: 1989
- Academic staff: 117
- Location: Taipei City
- Website: College of Foreign Languages and Literature, NCCU

The College of Foreign Languages and Literature (simplified Chinese: 外国语文学院; traditional Chinese: 外國語文學院; pinyin: Wàiguóyǔwén Xuéyuàn; abbreviated NCCU CFLL) at National Chengchi University (NCCU) was established in 1989. The college was detached from the "College of Liberal Arts" in 1989. NCCU CFLL is the first public college of foreign languages and literature established and also regarded nationally as one of the best CFLL in Taiwan.

Now, there are 7 departments, 5 graduate institutes, 3 research centers in the college and it provides programs in over 26 languages.

== Departments ==
- Department of English
- Department of Japanese
- Department of Slavic Languages and Literature
- Department of Arabic Languages and Literature
- Department of Korean Language and Culture
- Department of Turkish Language and Culture
- Department of European Languages and Culture

== Graduate Institutes ==
- Graduate Institute of Linguistics
- Graduate Institute of English
- Graduate Institute of Japanese
- Graduate Institute of Slavic Studies
- Graduate Institute of Korean Studies (Supported by the Academy of Korean Studies)

== Degree Program ==
- Southeast Asia Language and Culture (Bachelor's degree)
- Middle Eastern and Central Asian Studies (Master's degree)

== Research Centers ==
- Foreign Language Center
- Translation Center
- Cross-cultural Studies Center
- Foreign Language Center of Northern Taiwan (in cooperation with the Ministry of Education)

== Language Proficiency Test ==
- Vietnamese (in cooperation with Vietnam National University, Hanoi)
- Arabic
- Turkish
- Thai language

== Rankings ==
=== QS World University Rankings ===
By Subject

1. English Language and Literature: 201-250
2. Linguistics: 101-150
3. Modern Language: 101-150
