= Brest Business School =

French business school in Brest, western France

Coordinates: 48°24′22″N 4°31′17″W

- École Supérieure de Commerce de Bretagne Brest
- Other names: Brest BS
- Motto: Les nouvelles voies de la réussite
- Type: Business school
- Established: 1962; 64 years ago
- Affiliations: CGE
- Dean: Dai Shen
- Students: 806
- Location: Brest, Bretagne, France
- Campus: Urban
- Website: www.brest-bs.com
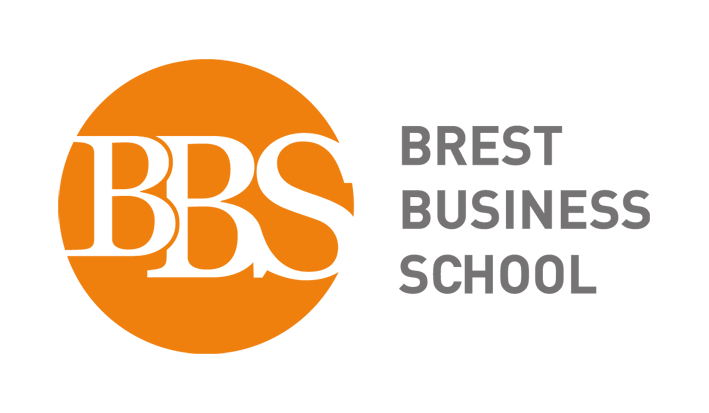

Brest Business School, also called ESC Bretagne Brest, France, is a French business School in the city of Brest in western France.

Founded in 1962, Brest BS provides business and management courses to 900 students. Currently, the school offers seven different programmes both in French and in English. The school is supported by the Chamber of Commerce and Industry of Brest. In January 2013, the school merged with three others to found France Business School. After the end of France Business School, as of January 2015, ESC Bretagne Brest regained its independence, thus also changing its name to Brest Business School.

In 2021, Brest Business School received AACSB accreditation, an international recognition awarded to business schools demonstrating excellence in teaching, research, curriculum development, and student learning. The school aims to leverage this accreditation to attract more international students and faculty.

== Accreditations and associations ==
- Member of the Conférence des Grandes Écoles
- A school authorised to deliver master's degrees
- Member of the management chapter of the Conférence des Grandes Écoles
- Member of the Fondation Nationale pour l’Enseignement de la Gestion des Entreprises (FNEGE)
- Member of the European Foundation for Management Development (EFMD)
- Member of the EISB (Entrepreneurship, Innovation and Small Business)
- Member of the Association to Advance Collegiate Schools of Business (AACSB International)
- Member of Produit en Bretagne (Produced in Brittany)
- Member of Campus responsables

== Notable alumni ==
- Graziella Melchior, French politician
- Laury Thilleman, French journalist, model, TV Host, actress
