= Douglas Hung =

Taiwanese politician (born 1936)

Douglas Hung (Chinese: 洪讀; born 13 March 1936) is a Taiwanese politician.

Hung earned a bachelor's and master's degree in diplomacy from National Chengchi University. He settled in San Francisco, where he was involved in several Taiwanese cultural and economic associations. Hung was also an administrator at Lincoln University. He soon began working for the Ministry of Foreign Affairs in San Francisco, and was subsequently appointed to the Overseas Chinese Affairs Commission. Hung returned to Taiwan to serve on the presidium of the second National Assembly, and was also a member of the Kuomintang's overseas residents and diplomacy committee. He was elected to the Legislative Yuan in 1998 as a Kuomintang-affiliated representative of Overseas Chinese. During his tenure on the fourth Legislative Yuan, Hung maintained an interest in the foreign relations of Taiwan.
