= France Business School =

French Business School

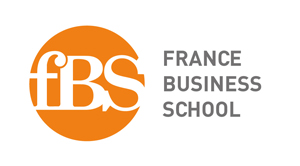
- Motto: New World. New School.
- Type: Grande École
- Established: 2012
- President: Isidore Fartaria
- CEO: Patrick Molle
- Academic staff: 170
- Students: 7.000
- Location: Paris Amiens Brest Clermont-Ferrand Orléans Poitiers Tours, France (also in China)
- Website: www.france-bs.com/en/

France Business School (fBS) was a French Business School, founded in 2012 by a meanwhile cancelled merger of four French business schools:

- l'École supérieure de commerce et management (ESCEM) in Tours, Poitiers and Orléans
- l'École supérieure de commerce d'Amiens (ESC Amiens)
- l'École supérieure de commerce de Clermont (ESC Clermont)
- l'ESC Bretagne Brest

== History ==
fBS was created in a period of merger between French Business Schools in order to achieve "critical size" at an international level. It was officially announced on 22 May 2012. fBS was finally announced as the merger of 4 pre-existing schools: l'École supérieure de commerce et de management (ESCEM) in Tours-Poitiers-Orléans, l'École supérieure de commerce d'Amiens (ESC Amiens), l'École supérieure de commerce de Clermont (ESC Clermont), l'École supérieure de commerce Bretagne Brest (ESC Bretagne Brest).

== Type of recruitment ==
At its inception, fBS announced its withdrawal from the existing admission testing procedures (BCE, Ecricome) and introduced a different admission procedure from the traditional competitive entrance examination system by organising recruitment days called Talent Days in about 20 French cities.

This recruitment targets different profiles:

- Students in the 2nd year of the preparatory track
- Holders of a 2-year undergraduate degree or currently enrolled as a Bachelor student
- Students with a 3-year undergraduate degree
- Graduates from an administrative or management degree programme
- Foreign students, holders of a Bachelor's degree
- Atypical profiles (students with "non-linear" backgrounds)

== Location ==
Other sites have joined the campuses of the founding fBS schools (Amiens, Brest, Clermont-Ferrand, Orléans, Poitiers, Tours):

- an associated site: Vannes
- sites abroad: Beijing and Shanghai
