= Graduate Business Forum =

American economics foundation

- Formation: 1983; 43 years ago
- Type: Non-profit organization
- Legal status: Foundation
- Headquarters: Fairfield, Connecticut, United States
- Region served: Worldwide
- Founder: Jim Deveau
- CEO: Siobhan Clarke
- Website: graduatebusinessforum.com

The Graduate Business Forum (GBF) is a United States based non-profit foundation, best known for its annual global Graduate Business Conference. The conference brings together top business leaders, political leaders, governments and selected students from the top 55 Master of Business Administration (MBA) Business Schools in the world to exchange the ideas and to discuss the "Most Challenging Issues" facing the world from the perspective of a responsible leadership. The Forum also organizes a series of regional meetings throughout the year.

The Forum is headquartered in Fairfield, Connecticut, United States. It is impartial and not-for-profit and is not tied to any political, partisan or national interest. Its highest governance body is the Board of Directors consisting of business, academic and previous student government leaders from multiple locations worldwide.

== History ==
The Graduate Business Forum was founded in 1983 by Jim Deveau, a then MBA student and President of the student government at Columbia Business School. Beyond conferences, the Forum produces articles on ethical and responsible leadership of the MBA community and engages its members in business schools or community initiatives.

== Membership ==
The GBF is a community where leadership is put into action, where best practices are shared, and where globalism is embraced by all its members.

Individual GBF Membership is restricted to elected Student Leaders of the Student Government Bodies of the top 55 MBA Business Schools in the world. Student Leaders are invited upon election to participate in the global activities, events, and network of the Graduate Business Forum.

Business schools that have participated in the GBF and GBC:

- Australian Graduate School of Management, Sydney
- Carnegie Mellon University, Tepper
- Case Western University, Weatherhead
- China Europe International Business School (CEIBS)
- Chinese University of Hong Kong
- Columbia Business School
- Cornell University, Johnson
- Copenhagen Business School
- Dartmouth College, Tuck
- Duke University, Fuqua
- Emory University, Goizueta
- ESADE Business School
- ESCP Business School
- Georgetown, McDonough
- Harvard Business School
- HEC Montreal
- HEC Paris
- Hong Kong University of Science and Technology
- IE Business School
- IESE Business School
- IMD Business School
- Indian Institute of Management - Ahmedabad
- Indian School of Business
- Indiana University, Kelley
- INSEAD
- International University of Japan
- London Business School
- London School of Economics
- Manchester Business School
- MIT Sloan School of Management
- McGill University
- Melbourne Business School
- Michigan State University, Broad
- Nanyang Technological University
- National Chengchi University
- National University of Singapore
- New York University, Stern
- Northwestern University, Kellogg
- Norwegian School of Economics
- Notre Dame University, Mendoza
- Purdue University, Krannert
- Queens School of Business
- RSM Erasmus University
- Stanford Graduate School of Business
- Stockholm School of Economics
- Tsinghua University
- University of California–Berkeley, Haas
- University of California–Los Angeles, Anderson
- University of Cambridge
- University of Chicago, Booth
- University of Cologne
- University of Economics, Prague
- University of Illinois at Urbana-Champaign
- University of Maryland, Smith
- University of Michigan, Ross
- University of North Carolina–Chapel Hill, Kenan-Flagler
- University of Oxford
- University of Pennsylvania, Wharton
- University of Rochester, Simon
- University of Southern California, Marshall
- University of Texas at Austin, McCombs
- University of Virginia, Darden
- University of Washington, The Michael G. Foster School of Business
- University of Western Ontario, Ivey
- University St. Gallen
- Washington University in St. Louis, Olin Business School
- Wits (Johannesburg)
- Yale University, SOM
- York University, Schulich

== Annual conference ==
The Graduate Business Forum's best-known activity is the annual global Graduate Business Conference, which brings together business and political leaders with selected student government leaders from the top 50 MBA Business Schools in the world. They exchange best practices, network, and debate the most pressing issues facing education and the economy from a responsible leadership perspective. The Forum also organizes a series of regional meetings throughout the year.

The Graduate Business Conference has been held since 1983:

YEAR, HOST UNIVERSITY, GBC THEME

- 2025, University of Western Ontario (Ivey), Resilience: A Pillar for Tomorrow’s Leaders
- 2021, Online (Virtual GBC), Improving for Impact: Transform Your Leadership Plan
- 2019, ESCP Paris, France: United in Diversity
- 2018, Copenhagen Business School, The Nordic Way in a Global Context
- 2017, The Chinese University of Hong Kong, Business 4 Good: The Ultimate Challenge!
- 2016, University of St. Gallen, Switzerland, Giving Back: The Responsibility of Future Leaders
- 2015, China Europe International Business School (CEIBS), Shanghai, The New Normal: China and the World
- 2014, No conference was held
- 2013, Indian School of Business, Hyderabad
- 2012, William E. Simon Graduate School of Business - Rochester, New York, Size Matters
- 2011, ESADE, Responsible Leadership
- 2010, University of Maryland (Smith), Post Crisis: Business Leadership in the New Global Economy
- 2009, National Chengchi University, Taipei, Accessing the Market of Greater China
- 2008, UC Berkeley (Haas), The Global Leader and the Leader Within
- 2007, National University of Singapore, The Silk Route
- 2006, Copenhagen Business School, Discovering Potential
- 2005, Indiana University (Kelley), Creating Value through Leadership
- 2004, University of Michigan (Ross), Leading in Dynamic Times
- 2003, University of Virginia (Darden), Innovate!
- 2002, Emory University (Goizueta), Getting to the Future First
- 2001, Cornell University (Johnson), Leading on the Edge
- 2000, UCLA (Anderson), The Net Effect
- 1999, University of Texas (McCombs), Driving Technological Change
- 1998, Washington University (Olin), Business in the Community
- 1997, Vanderbilt University (Owen), Managing Quality: Quality Managing
- 1996, UC Berkeley (Haas) , Entrepreneurship
- 1995, University of Western Ontario (Ivey), Global Competitiveness: What Does it Take?
- 1994, Case Western University (Weatherhead), The Changing Face of American Industry
- 1993, New York University (Stern) , Corporate Social Responsibility
- 1992, Indiana University (Kelley) , Business and the Environment
- 1991, University of Michigan (Ross) , 1992 and the EEC
- 1990, University of Washington (Foster), Pacific Rim Countries
- 1989, University of Virginia (Darden) , Business Ethics and Ideals
- 1988, Northwestern University (Kellogg), The Services Industry
- 1987, University of Texas (McCombs) , Innovation for Entrepreneurial Success
- 1986, University of Pennsylvania (Wharton), The Increasingly International Nature of Business
- 1985, Duke University (Fuqua) , MBA's in the Information Age
- 1984, UCLA (Anderson) , The Bottom Line of Leadership
- 1983, Columbia University , The MBA - A Student Perspective

== Global Student Leadership Award ==
The Student Leadership Award was inaugurated in 1991 by the board of directors of the Graduate Business Forum (GBF) to recognize leadership, innovation, and a commitment to the greater community at the graduate business level. In the past, influential leaders, such as CEOs, prime ministers, presidents, and royalty have bestowed this award upon a student or team during a commemorative banquet at the annual Graduate Business Conference.

Dave Chonowski and Chris Petersen, 2009 awardees from the University of Illinois at Urbana-Champaign, turned their winning idea into the MBA Veterans Network, a global community of military veteran students and alumni of the world's leading business schools. Their organization has generated significant interest from the business media and has since been featured in both BusinessWeek and the Wall Street Journal.

Member schools may execute up to two nominations for their institution.

== See also ==
- Global Leader of Tomorrow

== Reference books ==
- Barbara Kellerman, Reinventing Leadership: Making the Connection Between Politics and Business, Published by SUNY Press, 1999, ISBN 0-7914-4072-9, 268 pages.
- David Bornstein, How to Change the World: Social Entrepreneurs and the Power of New Ideas, Published by Oxford University Press US, 2007, ISBN 0-19-533476-0, 358 pages.
- David Rothkopf, Superclass: The global power elite and the world they are making, Published by Farrar, Straus and Giroux, 2008, ISBN 0-374-27210-7, 400 pages
- Mike Moore, A World Without Walls: Freedom, Development, Free Trade and Global Governance, Published by Cambridge University Press, 2003, ISBN 0-521-82701-9, 292 pages.
