= École supérieure de commerce et management =

French business school

Ecole Supérieure de Commerce Et Management
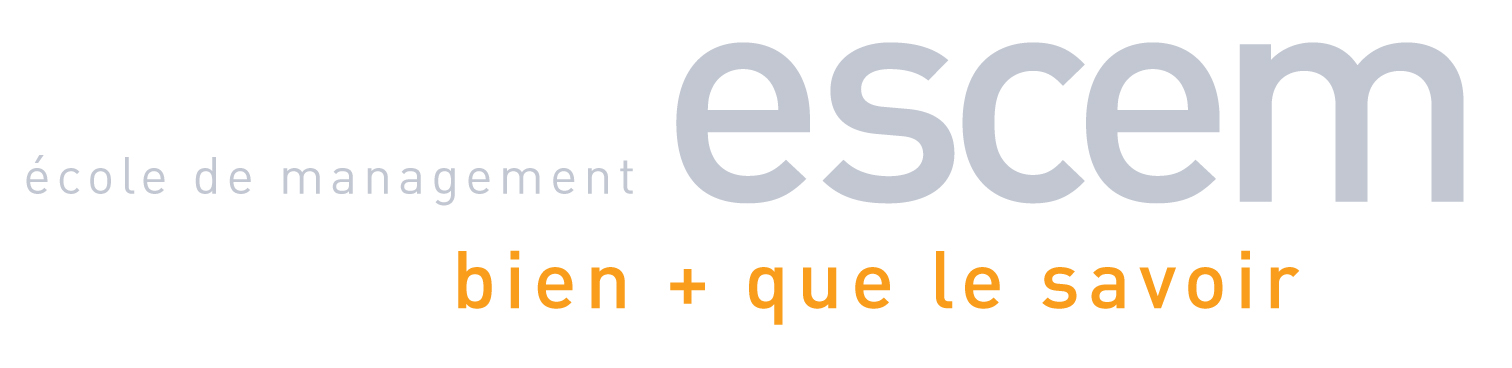
- Motto: Intégrité - Engagement - Curiosité - Humilité
- Type: Grande Ecole
- Established: 1998
- Affiliation: AACSB
- Students: 2,800
- Location: Tours-Poitiers, France; 47°21′53″N 0°42′16″E (Tour); 46°34′51″N 0°20′35″E (Poitiers)
- Website: www.excelia-group.fr

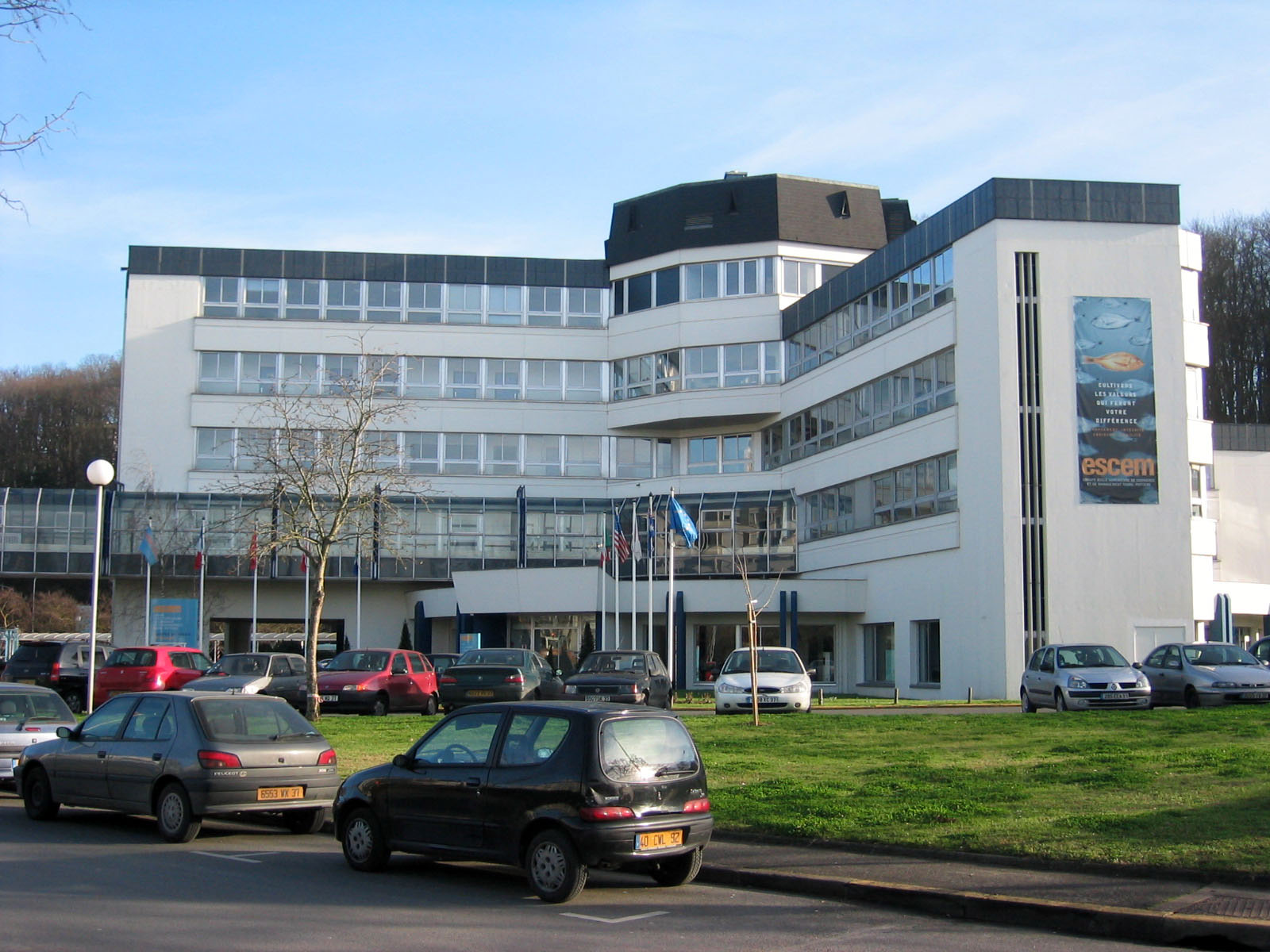
One of ESCEM's buildings in Tours.

The ESCEM School of Business and Management (French: "École Supérieure de Commerce et Management") was a business school located in Tours, Orléans and Poitiers in France which is now renamed Excelia Business School.

ESCEM was formed through the merger between the business schools ESC Tours (1982) and ESC Poitiers (1961) in 1998 as well as EGC Orléans in 2012. With a yearly enrolment of about 2'600 business students, ESCEM awarded around 15 different qualifications from Bachelor to Masters level degrees. ESCEM was a former member of Conférence des Grandes Écoles and successively obtained the AACSB and EQUIS accreditation. In 2012, it initiated the project of France Business School.

In September 2016, Sup de Co La Rochelle took a majority share of ESCEM.

In 2020 ESCEM joined Sup de Co La Rochelle and formed Excelia, a higher education group composed of three main campuses in La Rochelle, Tours and Orléans. It is structured as five schools offering programs from Bachelor (Bac+3) to Master level (Bac+5):

- Excelia Business School
- Excelia Tourism & Hospitality School
- Excelia Digital School
- Excelia Academy
- Excelia Executive Education

Excelia has 4,550 students and about 40,000 alumni.
