= Excelia Group =

French private institution of higher education

Excelia
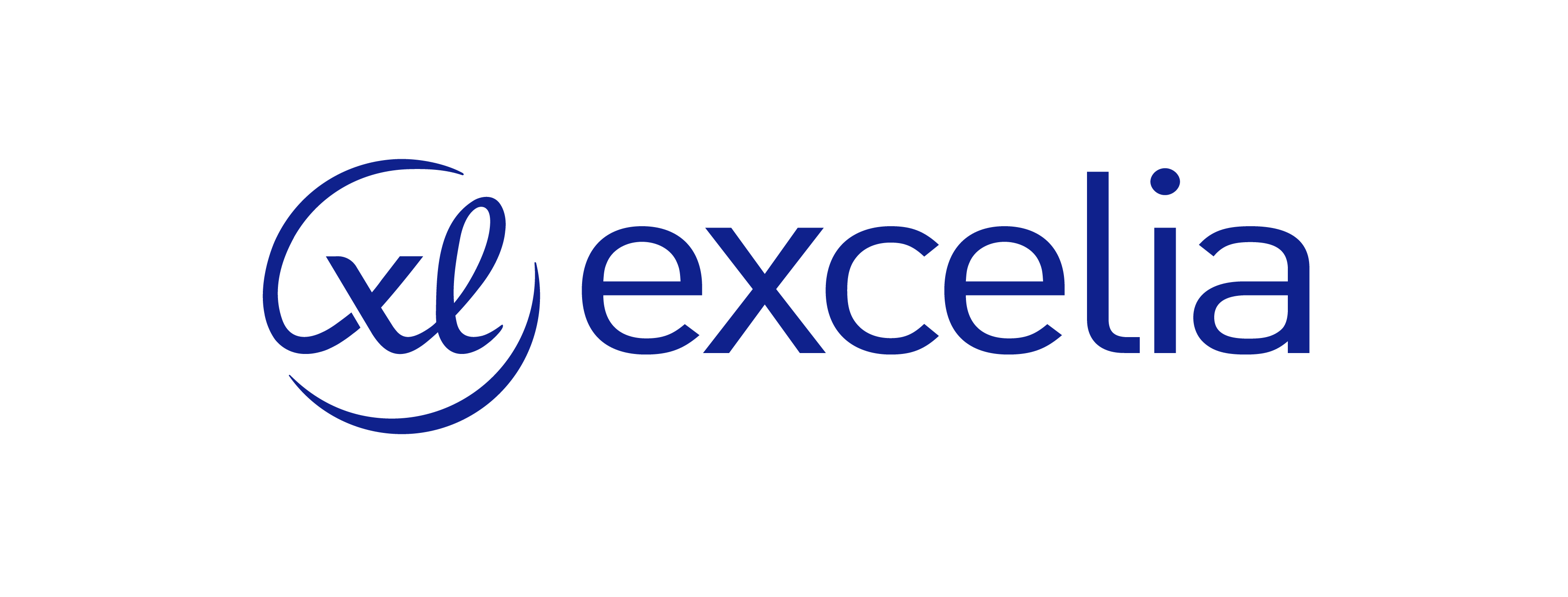
- Former names: Groupe Sup de Co La Rochelle
- Type: Private university
- Established: 1988
- Affiliations: AACSB (accredited); AMBA (accredited); EQUIS (accredited); Conférence des Grandes Écoles
- Budget: 30 million Euros
- Chairman: Stephane Cohat
- Dean: Bruno Neil
- Academic staff: 500
- Students: 5000
- Location: La Rochelle, Tours, Orléans, Paris, France
- Website: www.excelia-group.fr

Excelia is a French Grande école, a specialized top-level institution of higher education. Created in 1988 as Groupe Sup de Co La Rochelle, it is a private non-profit organisation linked to the La Rochelle Chamber of Commerce and Industry (CCI) and a member of the Conférence des Grandes Écoles. Excelia Group's Business School belongs to the approximately 100 business schools worldwide (corresponding to roughly 1% of all business school) holding a triple accreditation.

== History ==
Founded in 1988, the then Groupe Sup de Co La Rochelle has been a permanent member of the Conférence des Grandes Écoles since 2005.

In September 2016, Excelia acquired a majority share of the ESCEM Business School in Tours and Orléans which was then fully integrated into Excelia.

Excelia has now 5,000 students and nearly 40,000 Alumni.

== Schools ==
Excelia is organised into three schools:

- Excelia Business School
- Excelia Hotel & Tourism School
- Excelia Communication School

The historical campus of Excelia Group is located in La Rochelle and 3 additional campuses are in Tours, Orléans, and Paris.

Excelia programs are also offered in Niort.

== Accreditation ==
Excelia is accredited by The French Ministry of Education (French: Le Ministère de L'éducation Nationale).

Excelia Business School is EFMD-EPAS accredited since 2011 and AACSB accredited since 2013. As of summer 2020, Excelia Business School is bearer of the triple crown, thus joining the league of roughly 100 triple-accredited business schools worldwide.

Excelia Hotel & Tourism School holds the TedQual accreditation, delivered by the World Tourism Organisation (UNWTO), for all its programs in Tourism Management. The school is the first and only French institution of higher education to obtain TedQual accreditation for both Bachelor and MSc programs.

== Rankings ==
In 2025, the Financial Times ranked its Masters in Management program 39th in the world, 12th in France.

In 2025, the Times Higher Education IMPACT 2025 ranked Excelia at the 2nd place for the third consecutive year.

In 2026, the QS Business Master's rankings 2026 ranked 4 of its programmes being featured in these internationally recognised rankings.

In the Financial Times 2025 ranking, Excelia is one of the top 10 French business schools of choice for international students.
