= Martin Boehm (dean) =

German academic

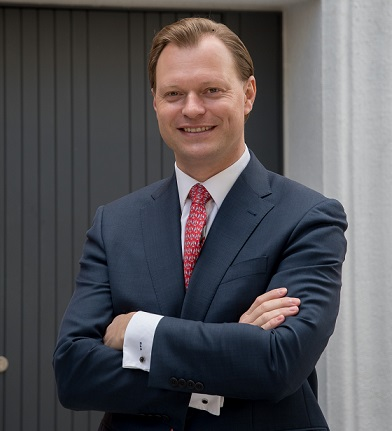
- Education: Reutlingen University (B.S.); Australian Graduate School of Entrepreneurship (MBA); Massachusetts Institute of Technology; Frankfurt University(PhD)
- Occupations: Rector of EBS Universität für Wirtschaft und Recht; Professor for Marketing and Sales
- Board member of: GMAC; EFMD

Martin Boehm is the rector and a professor of marketing at EBS Universität für Wirtschaft und Recht since September 2021. Previously, he was the dean of the prestigious IE Business School in Madrid from 2017 until 2021 and a professor of marketing since 2006.

He currently serves on the board of the Graduate Management Admission Council as well as on the European Foundation for Management Development's EQUIS and EOCCS Accreditation Board. Boehm is also a member of the Industry Advisory Board for the EMBA Council.

Martin Boehm holds an MBA from Australian Graduate School of Entrepreneurship and obtained a doctorate in marketing from Frankfurt University. Additionally, he participated in the SSP program at MIT.

== Publications (selection) ==
- Gensler, S., Verhoef, P., Böhm, M. (2011). “Understanding Consumers’ Multichannel Choices Across the Different Stages of the Buying Process”. Marketing Letters. Vol. 23(4): 987-1003
- Boehm, M. (2007). “Determining The Impact Of Internet Channel Use On A Customer’S Lifetime”. Journal of Interactive Marketing. Vol. 22(3): 2-22
- Marcos, F. (2012). “El ámbito de aplicación subjetivo de la Ley de Defensa de la Competencia”. Revista de Derecho Constitucional, Civil y Mercantil. Vol. 142, 2012
