= Corvinus School of Management =

Business school in Hungary

Coordinates: 47°29′10″N 19°3′29″E

- Type: Public
- Established: 2005 (university: 1920)
- Dean: Prof. Dr. Zita Paprika
- Location: Budapest, Hungary
- Campus: Urban
- Affiliations: EFMD, EPAS, EMBA Council, CEMS, PIM, CEEMAN
- Website: corvinus-mba.hu

The Corvinus School of Management (CSM), a division of Corvinus University of Budapest, is one of the leading business schools in Hungary offering Masters of Business Administration (MBA) programs and specialized management trainings.

== History ==
The predecessor of Corvinus University, the Budapest University of Economic Sciences (BUES) pioneered with the first MBA program in the Hungarian higher education system in 1992, in cooperation with the London Business School, supported by the British Know-How Fund. The university's department called Vezetőképző Intézet (Management Development Center) offered general management and specialized MBA programs, in English and in Hungarian.[Hivatkozás] Between 2001 and 2005, the university organized MBA and company management development programs under the brand ‘Budapest School of Management’. While the university picked up the name Corvinus in, the MBA unit changed its name to Corvinus School of Management as well. The school launched the country's first English language Executive MBA program and also moved to the listed cultural heritage main building of the university.

== Structure and management ==
Corvinus School of Management is an institute directly reporting to the dean of the Faculty of Business Administration. The institute is managed by the chairwoman and a six-member committee of the leading professors of the EMBA program. Corvinus School of Management has a Curatorium as an advisory board in which approx. 40 company executives and business experts are represented. The Curatorium is chaired by the British Ambassador to Budapest. Corvinus School of Management works with professors from the faculties of Corvinus University of Budapest, guest lecturers from partner universities, and business experts.

== Academic programs ==
Corvinus School of Management is active in four areas of post-experience management programs.

- Executive MBA program (in English, two years, weekend format)
- Full-Time MBA (in English, two years, Bologna master's degree)
- International Programs (3–14 days residencies for foreign MBA/EMBA groups)
- In-house programs (closed or open enrolment programs tailor-made with companies in the Central and Eastern European region)

== Accreditations and rankings ==
The Corvinus Executive MBA program, beyond its domestic registration, is accredited by EFMD’s EPAS accreditation since 2009 (re-accreditation in 2015). The Corvinus Full-time MBA program is a Bologna Master degree program accredited by the Hungarian Accreditation Committee. In 2014/2015, Bestmasters.com ranked the Corvinus Executive MBA program as 3rd in Eastern Europe. The Full-time MBA was ranked 4th. According to the 2014 QS MBA ranking, Corvinus School of Management is ranked #27 in Europe, in a list of 60 top European business schools. The school's parent organization, the Faculty of Business Administration is member of EFMD, PIM, and CEMS. From July 1, 2012, Corvinus School of Management is member of the Executive MBA Council.

== Partner institutions ==
Corvinus School of Management has partnered with international business schools to offer international residency modules or to host MBA groups in Budapest.

- Quinnipiac University Business School
- University of Richmond Robins School of Business
- Rotman School of Management
- University of St. Gallen
- Mannheim Business School
- Louvain School of Management
- University of Eastern Finland

== Notable course leaders ==
- BOD Péter Ákos, former president of the Hungarian National Bank
- DUNAVÖLGYI Mária, former regional director of MasterCard Central Europe
- KEREKES Sándor, former vice-rector of Corvinus University of Budapest
- MOHAI György, former chief executive officer at Budapester Stock Exchange
- WETZKER, Konrad, former chairman of Boston Consulting Group Budapest

== See also ==
- Corvinus University of Budapest
