= NUCB Business School =

Private graduate business school in Japan

Coordinates: 35.1724°N 136.8949°E

- Motto: Frontier Spirit
- Type: Private graduate business school
- Established: 1990
- Affiliations: AACSB, Association of MBAs (AMBA), EQUIS
- Dean: Seiichiro Iwasawa
- Academic staff: 50
- Administrative staff: 20
- Students: 700
- Location: Nagoya, Aichi, Japan
- Campus: Tokyo, Osaka, Nagoya
- Website: mba.nucba.ac.jp/en

NUCB Business School is a private graduate business school in Japan that was established in 1990 by the Kurimoto Educational Institute. The school offers an Executive MBA program, an MBA program, M.Sc. programs, and executive education programs.

== History ==
NUCB Business School was established in 1990 and launched graduate-level degree programs to develop business managers. In 2003, the school launched the first Executive MBA program in Japan.

- 1990 - NUCB Business School founded to provide graduate-level management education
- 2000 - One-year evening MBA program in Information Technology Management launched
- 2003 - Two-year Executive MBA launched
- 2004 - Two-year M.Sc. in taxation launched
- 2005 - Tokyo campus opened
- 2005 - Two-year Master in Management (English-track) launched
- 2005 - Center for Strategic Management established
- 2006 - The school becomes the second institution in Japan to be accredited by Association to Advance Collegiate Schools of Business International
- 2007 - Osaka campus opened
- 2009 - The school becomes the first institution in Japan to be accredited by the Association of MBAs
- 2009 - Membership of Association of Asia-Pacific Business Schools
- 2011 - Non-degree executive education launched
- 2011 - Membership of Principle for Responsible Management Education
- 2011 - Asia Pacific Case Center established
- 2012 - Membership of Executive MBA Council
- 2013 - International Advisory Board established
- 2013 - Two-year MBA in entrepreneurship launched
- 2015 - Nagoya Marunouchi campus opened
- 2015 - Center for Family Business established
- 2017 - Healthcare MBA track established
- 2018 - Center for Case Method established
- 2018 - Hosted the Case Method Seminar by Harvard Business Publishing
- 2019 - Case Center Japan established
- 2019 - Women's Leadership Program established
- 2020 - The Certificate in Leadership Development (CLD) established as a leadership development program with courses in areas such as healthcare, digital transformation, entrepreneurial initiatives, and executive management.
- 2021 - The school becomes the first institution in Japan to be a triple-accredited (AACSB, AMBA, EQUIS) school
- 2022 - The school joins the PIM Network.

=== International Accreditation ===
- Association to Advance Collegiate Schools of Business AACSB
- Association of MBAs AMBA
- European Quality Improvement System EQUIS

=== International Memberships ===
- Association of Asia-Pacific Business Schools (AAPBS)
- European Foundation for Management Development (EFMD)
- Executive MBA Council (EMBAC)
- Principles for Responsible Management Education (PRME)
- Partnership in International Management (PIM)

=== Local Accreditation ===
- Japan University Accreditation Association (JUAA)

NUCB Business School offers a Ministry of Education, Culture, Sports, Science and Technology BP-accredited part-time Executive MBA program, a part-time MBA in innovation and entrepreneurship, and a part-time MSc in taxation program as well as a full-time and part-time Masters in Management program.

=== Rankings ===
- Financial Times ranking 2018

Program	Category	Japan	Asia-Pacific
Executive MBA	Executive MBA	#1	#18

- QS ranking 2024-5

Program	Category	Japan	Asia-Pacific	World
Executive MBA	Executive MBA	#1	#17	#121
Full-time MBA	Global MBA	#1	#19	#121
Master in Management	MiM	#1	#10	#101

=== Campus ===
The school expanded into Tokyo in 2005 and then Osaka in 2007. The Tokyo Marunouchi campus is located one minute away from the Japan Railways Tokyo Station. The Osaka satellite campus originally occupied space in Umeda but was later moved to the Grand Front Osaka in Umekita which is also one minute away from the city's major Japan Railways train station. Both satellite campuses were chosen for their location in commercial and finance districts and their proximity to major train stations.

- Nagoya Marunouchi
- Tokyo Marunouchi
- Osaka Umekita

== Academic programs ==
=== Degree Education ===
- Executive MBA
- Master of Business Administration
- Master of Business Administration (English)
- Master of Science in Management (English)
- Master of Science in Accounting & Taxation

=== Executive Education ===
- MBA Essentials
- Pre MBA (certificate)

=== Exchange Program ===
The school offers an English-taught exchange program and double degree program. Involving over fifty different business courses from full-time faculty as well as visiting professors from its partner schools, the program utilizes the case method to facilitate exchange between diverse student backgrounds and perspectives. Exchange students can enroll for programs as short as two months within the five-term academic year schedule. This is designed to allow students on an exchange program to not only study, but also travel across Japan for a well-rounded study abroad experience. The double degree program requires that students spend one year at the school and one year at one of their 138 partner schools.

=== Exchange and Double Degree Partners ===
As of 2024, the school had standing academic and student exchange agreements with 138 global partner institutions for post-graduate faculty exchange and student exchange.

== Research centers ==
- Center for Entrepreneurship
- Center for Family Business
- Center for Case Method
- Center for Strategic Management

== Institutional partners ==
NUCB Business School has international exchanges with 138 partner business schools from 57 countries around the world including Carnegie Mellon University in United States, University of Alberta in Canada, Audencia Business School in France and Sasin Graduate Institute of Business Administration of Chulalongkorn University in Thailand. The Graduate School also facilitates a study abroad program for executive-level students at Harvard Business School, MIT Sloan School of Management and IMD Business School.
