= WSB University =

University in Dąbrowa Górnicza, Poland

- Polish: Akademia WSB
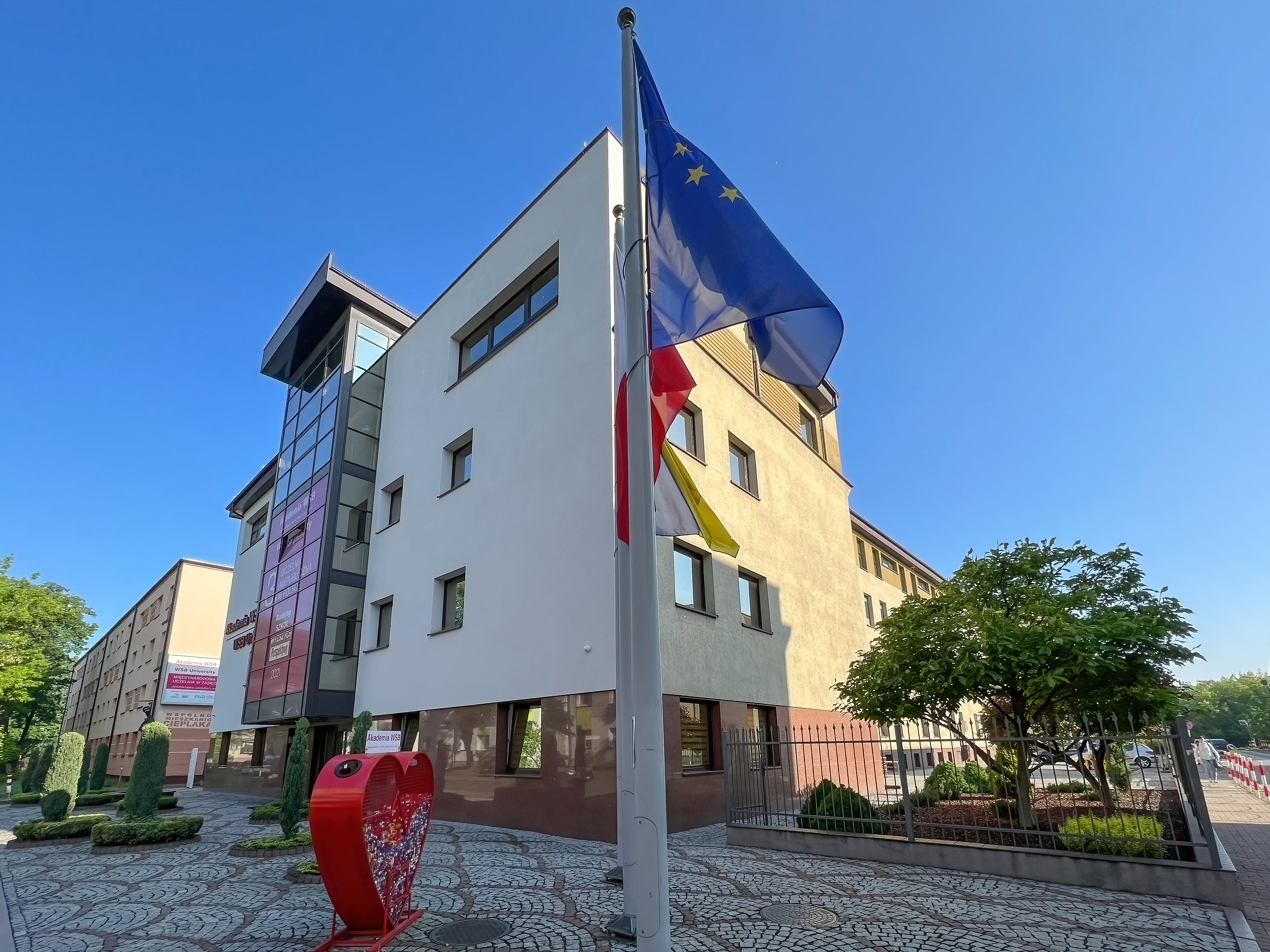
- Former name: University of Dąbrowa Górnicza
- Type: Private
- Established: 1995
- Founder: Zbigniew Pikiewicz
- Affiliations: EUA, Socrates-Erasmus, EFMD, CEEMAN
- President: Łukasz Sułkowski
- Rector: Associate Professor Zdzisława Dacko-Pikiewicz, Ph.D.
- Students: 11,430 (12.2023)
- Location: Dąbrowa Górnicza, Cieszyn, Gliwice, Jaworzno, Katowice, Kraków, Olkusz, Tychy, Warsaw, Żywiec, Poland
- Campus: Urban
- Website: wsb.edu.pl/en

WSB University (Wyższa Szkoła Biznesu w Dąbrowie Górniczej until 15 April 2018) is an academic higher education institution established in 1995. The university specialises in economic, social, humanities, technical and health sciences.

WSB University provides education in 10 locations (in the headquarters in Dąbrowa Górnicza and in the Branch Faculties in Cieszyn, Żywiec, Olkusz, Gliwice, Tychy, Kraków, Katowice, Jaworzno and Warsaw) in 23 fields of study, including first degree and second degree, uniform master's studies, conducts dual degree studies, implements Executive MBA and Master of Business Administration MBA studies (faculty partner: EY Academy of Business), postgraduate studies (offering more than 100 postgraduate courses), and they also run a doctoral school as well as doctoral seminars.

WSB University is authorised to confer post-doctoral and doctoral degrees in 4 scientific disciplines: management and quality sciences, pedagogy, security sciences and civil engineering, geodesy and transport.

One of 30 Polish research Universities funded by the Ministry of Education and Science under the 'Regional Excellence Initiative' programme.

WSB University has international accreditations and memberships: CEEMAN IQA - in the area of management education awarded by the International Association for Management Development in Dynamic Societies CEEMAN, two EUR-ACE label accreditations for Bachelor's degree programmes in Computer Science and for Bachelor's and Master's degree programmes in Transport awarded by the Accreditation Commission for Universities of Technology (KAUT), Excellence in Research (LOGO HR) awarded by the European Commission, which aims to enhance the attractiveness of working conditions and career development of researchers in the European Union, membership of The European University Association (EUA), and membership of the international association European Foundation for Management Development (EFMD), which promotes and strengthens excellence in management development.

== Structure ==
WSB Universities consists of 10 departments in seven cities in the south of Poland:

- WSB University in Dąbrowa Górnicza,
- WSB University in Olkusz,
- WSB University in Kraków,
- WSB University in Tychy,
- WSB University in Żywiec,
- WSB University in Cieszyn,
- WSB University in Gliwice.
- WSB University in Katowice,
- WSB University in Jaworzno,
- WSB University in Warsaw.

== History ==
The origin of WSB University dates back to the first half of the 1990s. When the Private College of Business and Foreign Languages was founded was the first in the Dąbrowa Górnicza. The university was found in 1995.

== Curriculum ==
The curriculum aims at interdisciplinarity and internationalization. The university encourages students to organize their own schedules.

The university offers bachelors, masters, doctorate and postgraduate programs, including a Bachelors of Engineering. The university organizes many symposia to enrich the learning experience.

== Partnerships ==
The university participates in the European Union and other international and research projects in its Lifelong Learning Programme, ERASMUS and ERASMUS MUNDUS. This grew into multilateral joint agreements with universities in many Europe and Asia. The university has about 60 bilateral cooperation agreements with overseas universities.

The university co-operates with the business sector, including the biggest Polish employers, whose management staff participate in the creation of study programs and conduct classes.

== Rankings ==
The university has earned high rankings among Polish higher education institutions and the State Accreditation Committee. According to Perspektywy, Rzeczpospolita, Wprost, Polityka and Home & Market, the university is one of the best in Poland. The committee approved the quality of education from faculties such as Management and Marketing (I and II cycle studies), IT (I and II cycle studies) and Sociology and Economics. The academy was awarded a prestigious accreditation of Economic Production and Operations Quality System (EPOQS™) on Management and Marketing faculty.

In the Perspektywy 2022 Ranking of Higher Education Institutions - WSB University was ranked 3rd in Poland in the Ranking of Non-Public Higher Education Institutions 2022.

In the Perspektywy 2022 Ranking of Academic Schools - the WSB University was ranked 32nd in Poland among all public and non-public universities authorised to confer the academic degree of doctor.

In the Ranking of MBA Programmes Perspektywy 2021 - WSB University was ranked 13th, thus reaching the "Golden Fifteen". It was ranked 4th in the 'Quality of Staff' category for its Executive MBA programme.
