= Education in Warsaw =

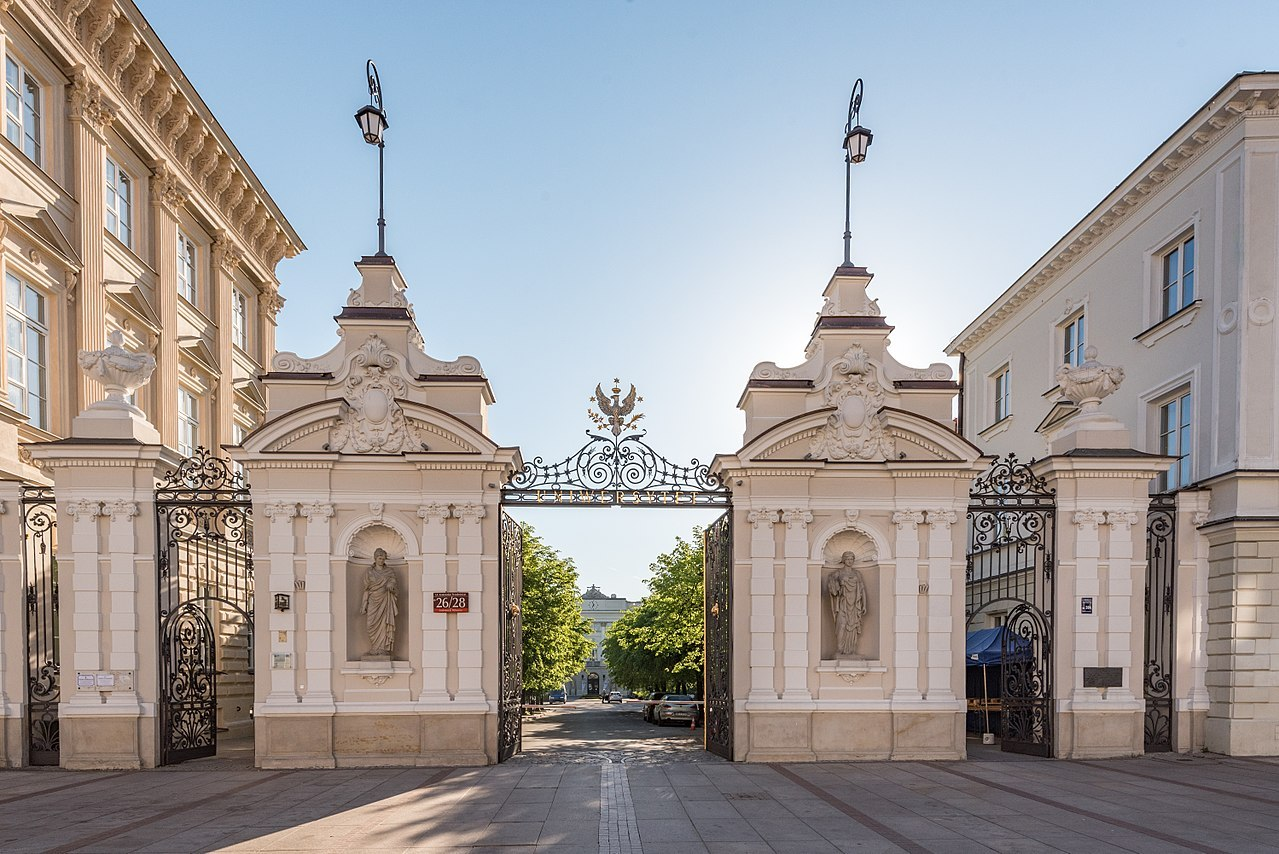
University of Warsaw, the Main Gate, Krakowskie Przedmieście Street

Warsaw is home to four major universities and more than 62 smaller schools of higher education. Overall, Warsaw has almost 500,000 students (29.2% of the city population, 2002) in all levels of education. The number of university students is more than 255,000.

The University of Warsaw (Uniwersytet Warszawski, 55,000 students, 19 faculties) was established in 1816, when the partitions of Poland separated Warsaw from the oldest and most influential Polish academic center, in Kraków. Warsaw University of Technology (Politechnika Warszawska, 31,000 students, 18 faculties) was the second academic institution of technology in the country and is one of the largest in Central Europe, employing 2,000 professors. It was established in 1898 as the Nicolas II's Technical Institute, and in 1915 changed its name to the present one. Other institutions for higher education include:

- Medical University of Warsaw (Warszawski Uniwersytet Medyczny — the largest medical school in Poland. It was established in 1950 as the Medical Academy (earlier, medicine was being lectured at the Medical Faculty of the University of Warsaw); the present name obtained in 2008. There are 10,000 students and four faculties.
- National Defence University (AON) — the highest military academic institution in Poland, established in 1951 with seven faculties.
- Chopin University of Music (Uniwersytet Muzyczny Fryderyka Chopina) — the oldest and largest music school in Poland and one of the largest in Europe, established in 1810 with six faculties.
- Warsaw School of Economics (SGH) — the oldest economic university in the country, established in 1906 as "August Zieliński's Men's Private Trade Courses". Between 1949 and 1991, the university was named "Main School of Planning and Statistics"; the present name was obtained in 1916. There are no faculties as all the professors work in the five colleges and the educational programs are made by the whole university, not by a given college. There are 18,000 students.
- University of Life Science (SGGW) — the largest agricultural university, established in 1816 as the Agronomic Institute. It was renamed Institute of Forestry and Farming in 1840 and the Main School of Farming in 1919 (this is still the university's name in Polish). There are 30,000 students and 13 faculties.
- Academy of Physical Education (AWF) — established in 1929 as the Central Institute of Physical Education; the present name was obtained in 1949. There are three faculties.

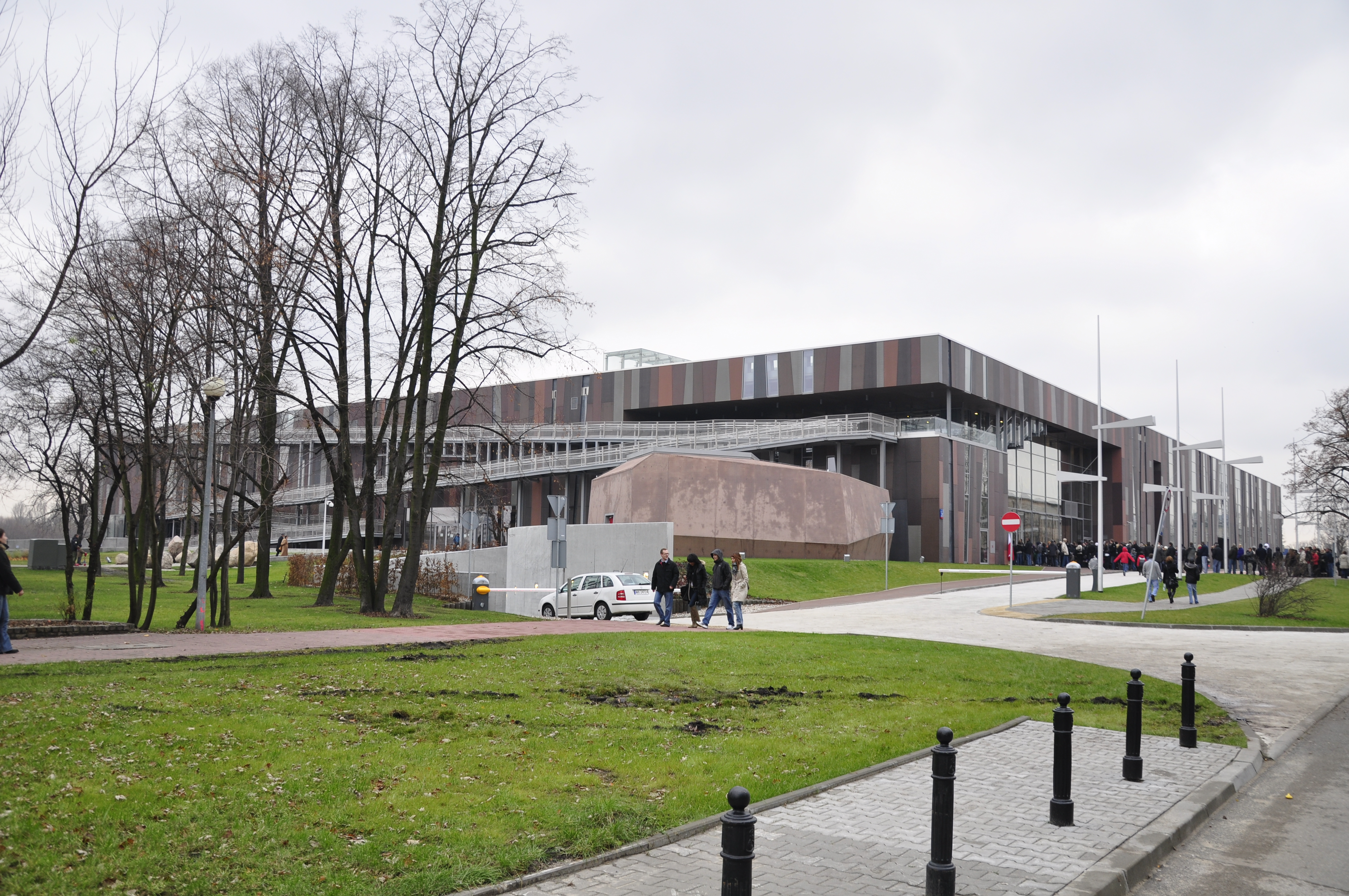
Copernicus Science Centre

The Copernicus Science Centre, a science museum, is located on the bank of the Vistula River in Warsaw. The centre is the largest institution of its type in Poland, containing more than 450 interactive exhibits that enable visitors to carry out experiments and discover the laws of science.

== List of institutions in Warsaw ==
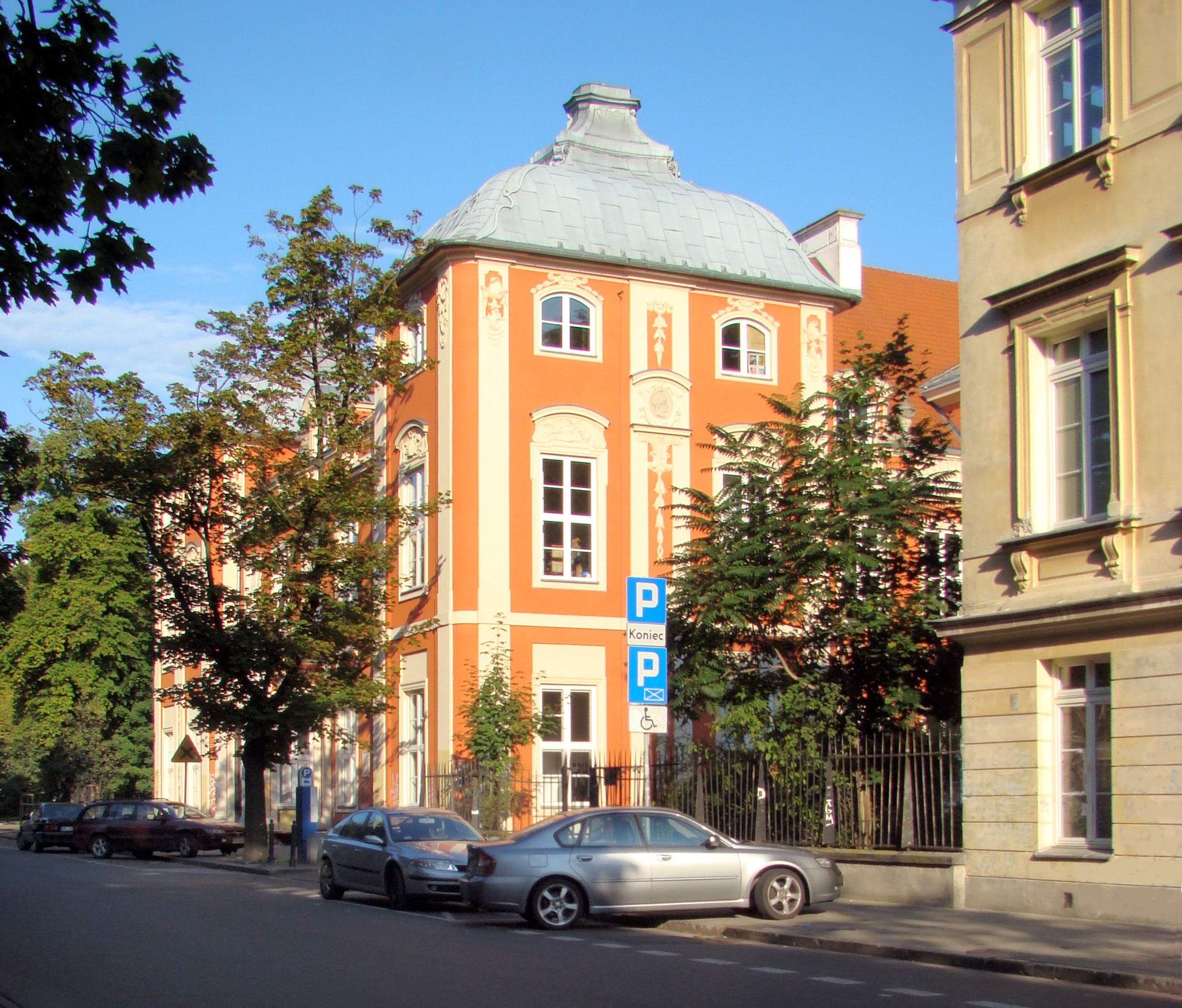
Academy of Fine Arts in Warsaw

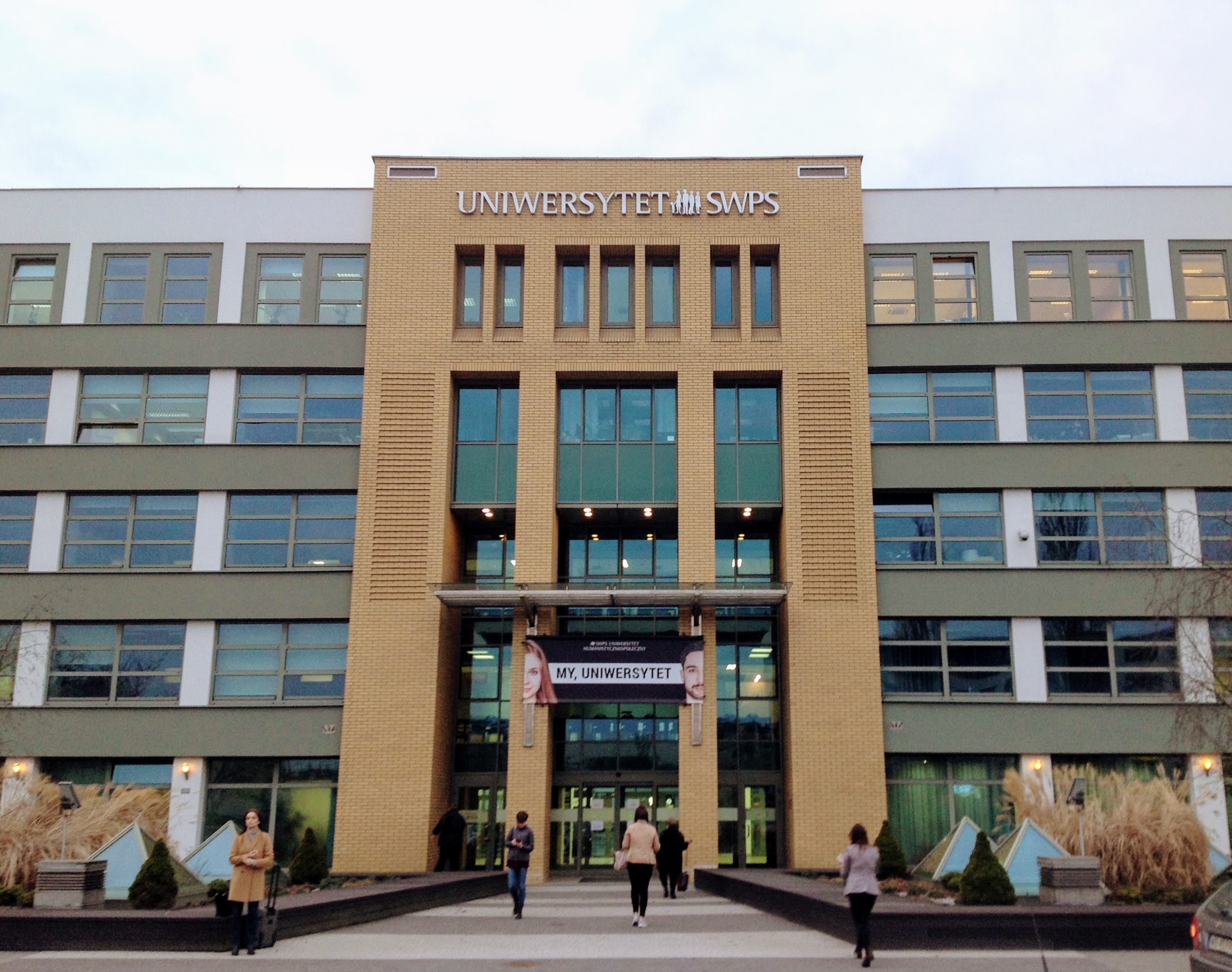
Building of the SWPS University of Social Sciences and Humanities

Other scientific institutions in the city include:

- University of Warsaw (Uniwersytet Warszawski)
- Warsaw University of Technology (Politechnika Warszawska)
- Cardinal Stefan Wyszyński University (Uniwersytet Stefana kardynała Wyszyńskiego)
- Medical University of Warsaw (Warszawski Uniwersytet Medyczny)
- War Studies University (Akademia Sztuki Wojennej)
- Chopin University of Music (Uniwersytet Muzyczny Fryderyka Chopina)
- Theatre Academy (Akademia Teatralna im. Aleksandra Zelwerowicza)
- SGH Warsaw School of Economics (Szkoła Główna Handlowa) (former name — Szkoła Główna Planowania i Statystyki)
- Warsaw Agricultural University (Szkoła Główna Gospodarstwa Wiejskiego)
- Warsaw Academy of Fine Arts (Akademia Sztuk Pięknych)
- Józef Piłsudski University of Physical Education, Warsaw (Akademia Wychowania Fizycznego Józefa Piłsudskiego w Warszawie)
- SWPS University (SWPS Uniwersytet Humanistycznospołeczny)
  - Branches in Wrocław, Sopot, Poznań, and Katowice

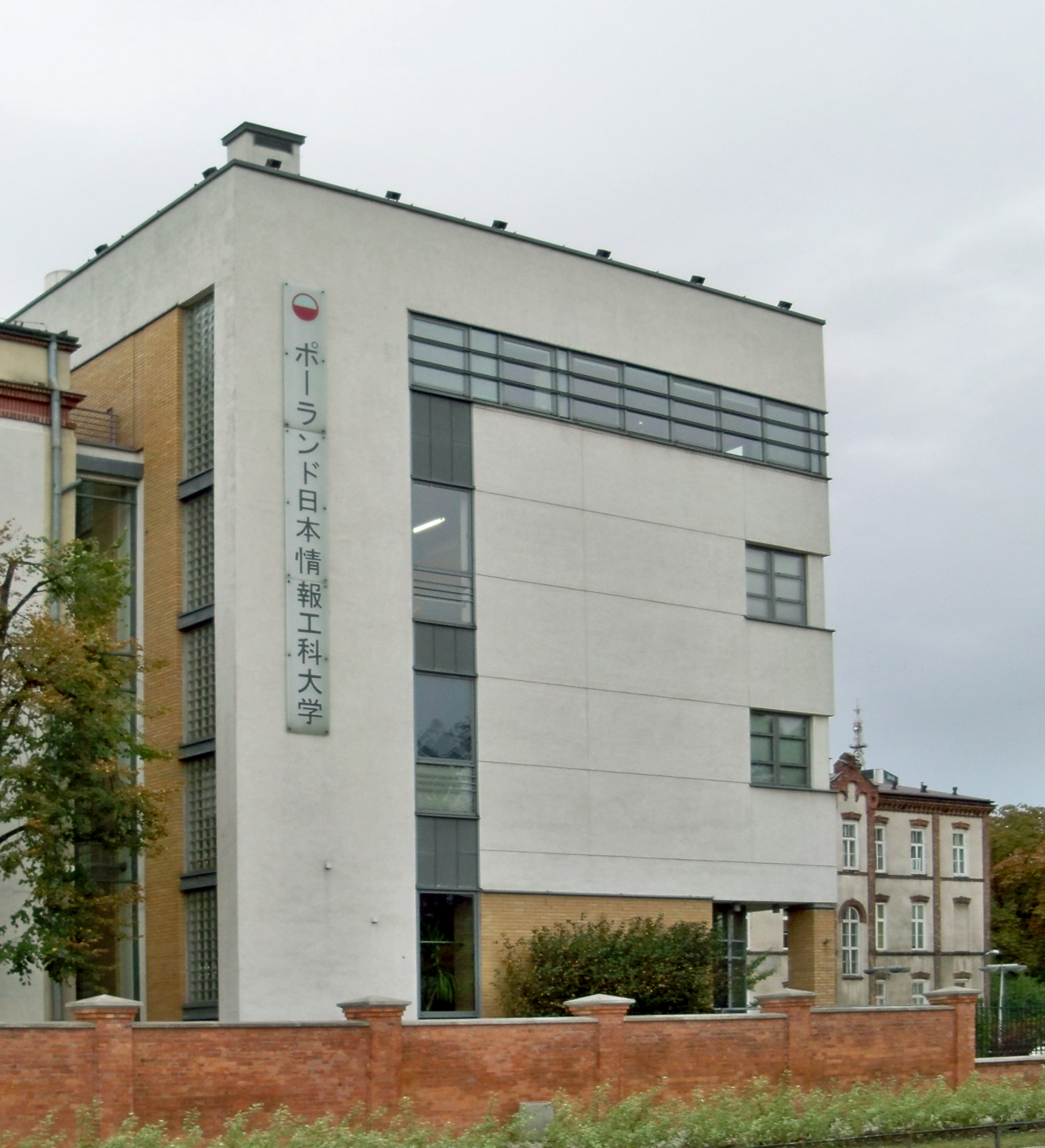
Polsko-Japońska Wyższa Szkoła Technik Komputerowych

Other (mostly community-run and private) schools include:

- Collegium Civitas
- Collegium Humanum – Warsaw Management University
- Vistula University
- Europejska Akademia Sztuk
- European School of Law and Administration (ESLA)
- Olympus Szkoła Wyższa im. Romualda Kudlińskiego (former name — Wyższa Szkoła Bankowości, Finansów i Zarządzania im. prof. Romualda Kudlińskiego)
  - Branches in Łódź and Stalowa Wola
- Pedagogium - Wyższa Szkoła Pedagogiki Resocjalizacyjnej
- Polsko-Japońska Wyższa Szkoła Technik Komputerowych
  - Branch in Bytom
- Prywatna Wyższa Szkoła Businessu i Administracji
- Szkoła Wyższa im. Bogdana Jańskiego
  - Branches in Chełm, Elbląg and Kraków
- Szkoła Wyższa Mila College
- Szkoła Wyższa Przymierza Rodzin
- Szkoła Wyższa Rzemiosł Artystycznych
- Szkoła Wyższa Warszawska
- Warszawska Szkoła Biznesu
- Warszawska Szkoła Zarządzania - Szkoła Wyższa
- Warszawska Wyższa Szkoła Ekonomiczna
- WSB University, Warsaw
- Wszechnica Polska - Szkoła Wyższa TWP
- Wyższa Szkoła Administracyjno - Społeczna
- Wyższa Szkoła Celna
- Wyższa Szkoła Działalności Gospodarczej
- Wyższa Szkoła Dziennikarska im. M. Wańkowicza
  - Branch in Lublin

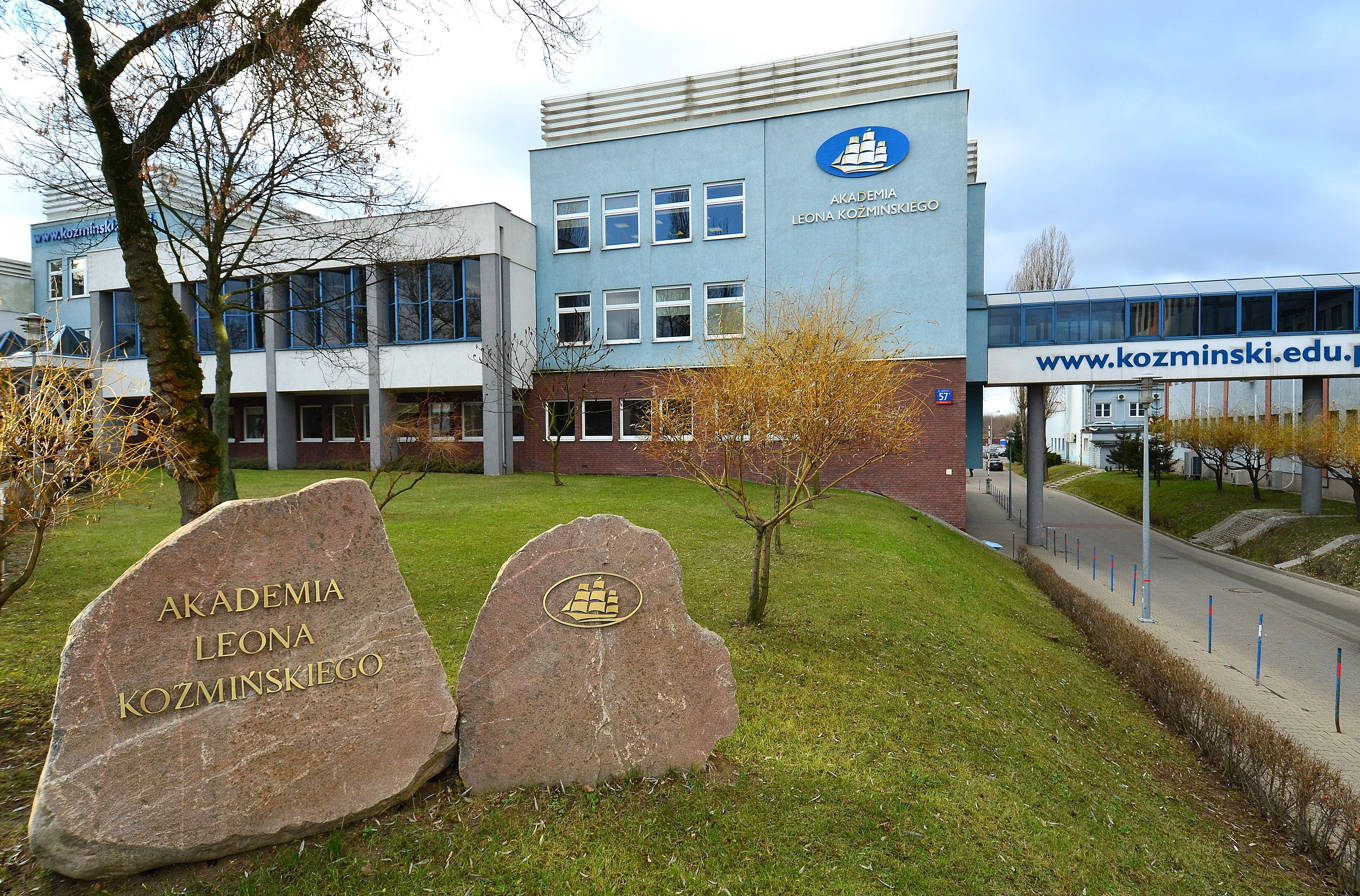
Part of Kozminski University campus

- Wyższa Szkoła - Edukacja w Sporcie
  - Sport and Leisure Institute in Wrocław
- Wyższa Szkoła Ekologii i Zarządzania
- Wyższa Szkoła Ekonomiczna
  - Branch in Koszalin
- Wyższa Szkoła Ekonomiczno-Informatyczna
- Wyższa Szkoła Finansów i Zarządzania
- Wyższa Szkoła Gospodarowania Nieruchomościami
  - Branches in Białystok and Gdańsk
- Wyższa Szkoła Handlu i Finansów Międzynarodowych
- Wyższa Szkoła Handlu i Prawa im. Ryszarda Łazarskiego
- Wyższa Szkoła Hotelarstwa, Gastronomii i Turystyki
- Wyższa Szkoła Informatyki Stosowanej i Zarządzania
- Wyższa Szkoła Informatyki, Zarządzania i Administracji
- Wyższa Szkoła Infrastruktury i Zarządzania Rolnictwem
- Wyższa Szkoła Języków Obcych i Zarządzania Finansami "Avans"
- Wyższa Szkoła Komunikowania i Mediów Społecznych im. Jerzego Giedroycia
- Wyższa Szkoła Menedżerska SIG
  - Branch in Ciechanów
- Wyższa Szkoła Nauk Społecznych im. Ks. J. Majki
- Wyższa Szkoła Organizacji Turystyki i Hotelarstwa
- Wyższa Szkoła Pedagogiczna TWP
  - Branches in Olsztyn, Katowice, Człuchów, Wałbrzych; divisions in Lublin, Szczecin and Wałbrzych
- Wyższa Szkoła Pedagogiczna ZNP
- Wyższa Szkoła Promocji
- Wyższa Szkoła Przedsiębiorczości i Zarządzania im. Leona Koźmińskiego
- Wyższa Szkoła Społeczno-Ekonomiczna
- Wyższa Szkoła Stosunków Międzynarodowych i Amerykanistyki
- Wyższa Szkoła Sztuk Wizualnych i Nowych Mediów
- Wyższa Szkoła Techniczno-Ekonomiczna
- Wyższa Szkoła Turystyki i Hotelarstwa
- Wyższa Szkoła Turystyki i Języków Obcych
- Wyższa Szkoła Turystyki i Rekreacji
- Wyższa Szkoła Ubezpieczeń i Bankowości
- Wyższa Szkoła Zarządzania
- Wyższa Szkoła Zarządzania i Prawa
  - Branch in Płońsk
- Wyższa Szkoła Zarządzania Personelem
- Wyższa Szkoła Zawodowa Kosmetyki i Pielęgnacji Zdrowia
- Wyższa Warszawska Szkoła Humanistyczna
- Społeczna Wyższa Szkoła Przedsiębiorczości i Zarządzania in Łódź, Branch in Warsaw
