= Student loans in France =

Subsidies for university study

Student loans and grants in France are primarily provided by the government through the Centre régional des œuvres universitaires et scolaires (CROUS), and Établissement public à caractère administratif. The CROUS is responsible for Student Finance France. Most undergraduate university students resident in France are eligible for student loans.

== Eligibility ==
Grants are provided based on family or individual resources. Most students are entitled to a mínimum grant.

=== Tuition fees ===
Any student receiving a state grant is automatically entitled to 100% reduction in Tuition Fees at state universities.

=== Means tested higher education grants (bourses d'enseignement supérieur sur critères sociaux) ===
This type of grant is targeted at those whose parents have low revenues. The eligibility is weighted taking into account, distance to the family residence, number of siblings studying, if the student is handicapped and if the student is married or in a legal partnership. If the student is not entitled to a higher weighting due to any of the criteria and family revenue is above 33150 euros/year (in 2014) then the minimum grant will be paid out (€1000). The maximum grant (€550/month) is only payable if a family has no revenue or achieves the highest rating and has a revenue of under 21500 euros/year Approximately 30% of students are entitled to a means tested grant

=== Other grants ===
==== Merit-based assistance (Aide au mérite) ====
These grants are given to those students who are entitled to a means-tested grant and have achieved high grades (16 out of 20 in the baccalaureate or be amongst the best students in the last year of bachelor's degree). The grant is 200 euros/month (for nine months)

==== Assistance to independent young persons (Aide aux jeunes en situation d'autonomie avérée) ====
This grant is designed to assist students who due to family issues (separation, divorce or death) cannot count on parental support. The grant ranges from 4000 euros annually to 5000 euros annually. Approximately 7000 students received this type of grant in 2013.

==== International mobility assistance (Aides à la mobilité internationale) ====
This grant is paid as a supplement to the means-tested grant and is 400 euros per month for up to 9 months for a student attending a recognised foreign university as part of his or her studies.

==== Emergency assistance (Aides d'urgence) ====
Students whose family is not resident in France or who are over 28 years old or who are estranged from their family may be entitled to this grant. The annual amount ranges from 1650 euros to 4735 euros.

=== Student loans (Prêts étudiants) ===
Students are eligible for state-guaranteed loans of up to 15000 euros at a low interest rate. 70% of the amount loaned is guaranteed 10 years by the state. The loans are granted by commercial banks and require a further guarantee for the remaining 30%.

== See also ==
- Tuition fees in France
- Universities in France
