= EMBA =

EMBA may refer to:

- Executive Master of Business Administration, education degree
- EMBA Mink Breeders Association, US
- EMBA council
