= Business school =

University-level institution teaching business administration

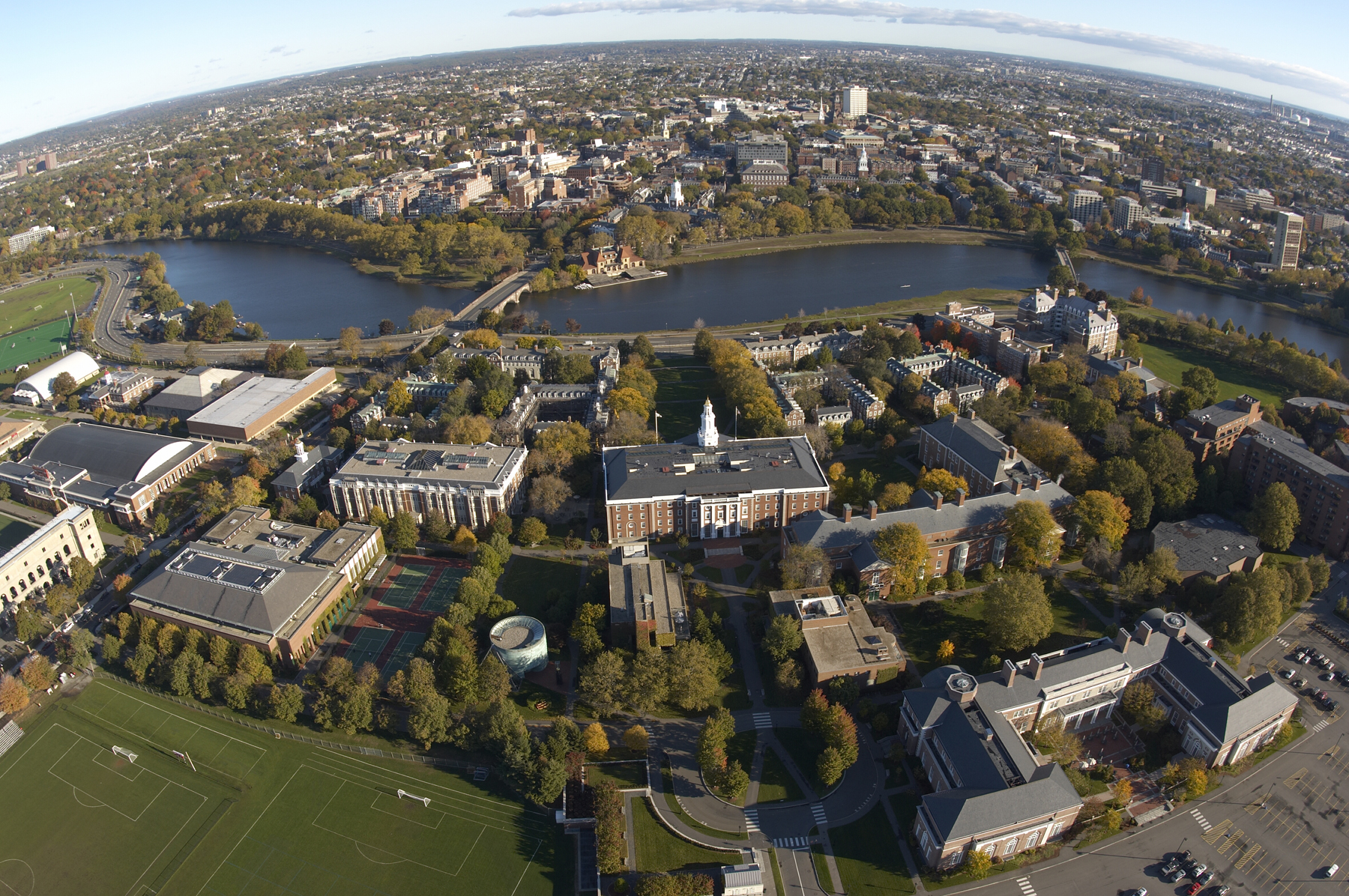
Harvard Business School in Boston, founded in 1908

Cambridge Judge Business School in Cambridge, founded in 1990

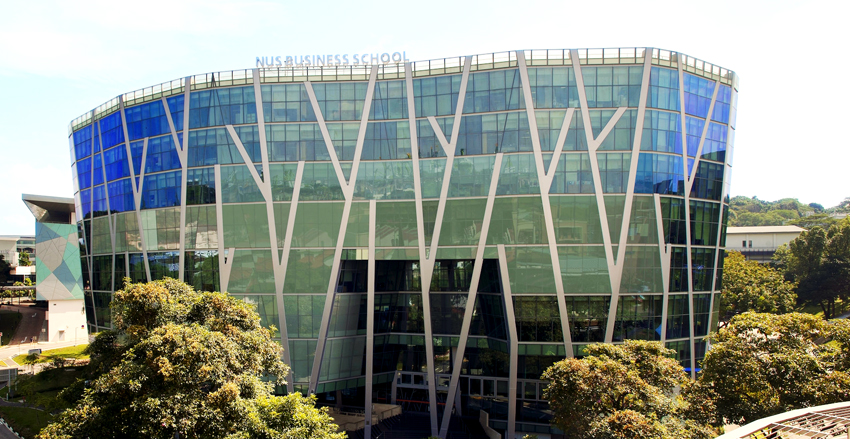
NUS Business school in Singapore, founded in 1965

A business school is a higher education institution or professional school that teaches courses leading to degrees in business administration or management.

A business school may also be referred to as school of business, school of management, management school, school of business administration, college of business, business college, or colloquially b-school or biz school.

== Types ==
There are several forms of business schools, including a school of business, business administration, and management.

- Most of the university business schools consist of faculties, colleges, or departments within the university, and predominantly teach business courses.
- In North America, a business school is often understood to be a university program that offers a graduate Master of Business Administration degrees and/or undergraduate bachelor's degrees.
- In Europe and Asia, some universities teach predominantly business courses.
- Privately owned business school which is not affiliated with any university.
- Highly specialized business schools focusing on a specific sector or domain.
- In France, many business schools are public-private partnerships (École consulaire or EESC) largely financed by the public Chambers of Commerce. These schools offer accredited undergraduate and graduate degrees in business from the elite Conférence des Grandes Écoles and have only loose ties, or no ties at all, to any university.

Andreas Kaplan classifies business schools along four corners:

1. Culture (Europe - US): Independent of their actual (physical) location, business schools can be classified according to whether they follow the European or the US model.
2. Compass (international/global – regional/local): Business schools can be classified along a continuum, with international/global schools on one end and regional/local schools on the other.
3. Capital (public – private): Business schools can either be publicly (state) funded or privately funded, for example through endowments or tuition fees.
4. Content (teaching – research): Business school can be classified according to whether a school considers teaching or research to be its primary focus.

== Notable firsts ==
The first business school appeared in Europe in the eighteenth century. The concept spread from the beginning of the nineteenth century.

- 1759 – The Aula do Comércio in Lisbon was founded as the world's first institution specialising in the teaching of accounting. It provided a model for the development of similar government-sponsored schools across Europe, and closed in 1844.
- 1819 – The oldest business school still in existence as of 2025, ESCP Business School, was established as Ecole Supérieure de Commerce de Paris, in Paris, France. Initially a private school, it became a family firm from 1830 to 1869.
- 1852 – The Belgian Higher Institute of Commerce, founded in Antwerp, was established as the first state-funded business school and the first business school in Belgium.
- 1857 – Budapest Business School was founded in Budapest in Austria-Hungary as the first business school in Central Europe.
- 1868 – Ca' Foscari University was founded in Venice as the first business school in Italy.
- 1881 – Wharton School at the University of Pennsylvania in Philadelphia was founded as the first business school in the United States.
- 1898 – Haas School of Business was established as the College of Commerce of the University of California, Berkeley, the first public business school in the US.
- 1898 – Handelshochschule Leipzig, now HHL Leipzig Graduate School of Management, was founded as the first business school in Germany and the oldest in German-speaking regions.
- 1898 – University of St. Gallen was established as the first university in Switzerland to teach business and economics.
- 1900 – The first graduate school of business in the United States, the Tuck School of Business at Dartmouth College, was founded. The school conferred the first advanced degree in business, specifically, a Master of Science in Commercial Sciences, a predecessor of the MBA.
- 1902 – The University of Birmingham opened its School of Commerce, the first school dedicated to commerce in the UK, and established the first Bachelor of Commerce degrees.
- 1906 – Warsaw School of Economics (SGH) was established as the first university in Poland dedicated to teaching commerce and economics.
- 1908 – Harvard Business School was founded at Harvard University as the first business program in the world to offer the Master of Business Administration degree.
- 1909 – Stockholm School of Economics was founded on the initiative of the Swedish business sector as the first business school in Sweden.
- 1921 – Shanghai University of Commerce was established as the first business school in China.
- 1926 – The first postgraduate business courses in the United Kingdom were offered at the Manchester College of Technology.
- 1936 – The Norwegian School of Economics (NHH) was founded as the first business school in Norway.
- 1943 – The first executive MBA program was launched at the Booth School of Business, University of Chicago.
- 1946 – The Thunderbird School of Global Management, then the American Institute for Foreign Trade, was founded as the first graduate management school focused exclusively on global business.
- 1948 – The first MBA program outside of the US was established in Canada at the Richard Ivey School of Business, University of Western Ontario.
- 1949 – The University of Pretoria in South Africa founded the first business school in Africa (now the Gordon Institute of Business Science), and launches the first MBA course outside of North America.
- 1949 – XLRI, India's first business management school was founded.
- 1954 – Istanbul University Graduate School of Business, established with support from Harvard Business School and the Ford Foundation, becomes Turkey’s first graduate business school.
- 1955 – The Institute of Business Administers at the University of Karachi launched the first MBA in Asia.
- 1957 – INSEAD in France started the first MBA in Europe and pioneered the one-year MBA.
- 1963 – ESAN University Graduate School of Business in Lima, Peru, became the first Graduate Business School founded in Latin America. It was established under an agreement between the Government of the United States, Stanford Graduate School of Business and the Government of Peru.
- 1963 – The first MBA program in Australia was established by Melbourne Business School.
- 1964 – IESE Business School in Barcelona launched the first two-year MBA programme in Europe.
- 1965 – Following the 1963 Franks Report, the first business schools were established in UK universities, including Manchester and Durham.
- 1966 – London Business School and the University of Strathclyde opened the first MBA programs in the UK. Strathclyde was the first British university to offer the 1-year MBAs that would become standard in the UK.
- 1991 – IEDC-Bled School of Management in Slovenia became the first business school to offer an MBA program in Eastern Europe.

== Degrees ==
=== United States ===
In the United States, common degrees in business are:

- Associate degrees: Associate of Applied Business (AAB), Associate of Business Administration (ABA);
- Bachelor's degrees: Bachelor of Business (BB), Bachelor of Business Administration (BBA), Bachelor of Science in Business (BSB);
- Master's degrees: Master of Accounting (MAcc), Master of Business Administration (MBA), Master of Science in Business Administration (MSBA), Executive Mastery of Business Administration (EMBA), Master of Engineering Management (MEM), Master of Science in Engineering Management (MSEMgt), Master of Health Administration (MHA), Master of Health Care Administration (MHCA), Master of Health Care Management (MHCM), Master of Health Services Administration (MHSA), Master of Science in Health Administration (MSHA), Master of Science in Health Care Administration (MSHCA), Master of Hospitality Management (MHM), Master of International Business (MIB), Master of International Business Administration (MIBA), Master of Management (MM), Master of Manufacturing Management (MMM), Master of Professional Accounting (MPA), Master of Science in Management (MSM or MSMgt), Master of Tourism Management (MTM), Matey of Tourism and Hospitality Management (MTHM);
- Research doctorates: Doctor of Business Administration (DBA).

Graduates in business may also have generically titled degrees such as Bachelor of Science (BS), Master of Science (MS) or Doctor of Philosophy (PhD).

=== Europe ===
In Europe, higher education degrees are organized into three cycles under the Bologna Process in order to facilitate international mobility: bachelor's, master's and doctorates. The details of how degrees are organized vary between countries and institutions, but in terms of ECTS credits, where 60 credits represents a full academic year's work, a bachelor's degree typically requires 180–240 credits and a master's degree 90–120 credits.

==== France ====
In France, those levels of study include various "parcours" or paths based on UE (unités d'enseignement or modules), each worth a defined number of ECTS credits. Grande école business schools are elite academic institutions that admit students through an extremely competitive process, and the PGE (Programme Grande École) ends with the degree of Master in Management (MiM).

== Case studies ==
Some business schools structure their teaching around the use of case studies (i.e. the case method). Case studies have been used in graduate and undergraduate business education for nearly one hundred years. Business cases are historical descriptions of actual business situations. Typically, information is presented about a business firm's products, markets, competition, financial structure, sales volume, management, employees and other factors influencing the firm's success. The length of a business case study may range from two or three pages to 30 pages or more.

Students are expected to scrutinize the case study and prepare to discuss strategies and tactics that the firm should employ in the future. Three different methods have been used in business case teaching:

1. Preparing case-specific questions to be answered by the student. This is used with short cases intended for Undergraduate students. The underlying concept is that such students need specific guidance to be able to analyze case studies.
2. Problem-solving analysis is the second method initiated by the Harvard Business School, which is by far the most widely used method in MBA and executive development programs. The underlying concept is that with enough practice (hundreds of case analyses), students develop intuitive skills for analyzing and resolving complex business situations. Successful implementation of this method depends heavily on the skills of the discussion leader.
3. A generally applicable strategic planning approach. This third method does not require students to analyze hundreds of cases. A strategic planning model is provided, and students are instructed to apply the steps of the model to six – and up to a dozen cases – during a semester. This is sufficient to develop their ability to analyze a complex situation, generate a variety of possible strategies, and select the best ones. In effect, students learn a generally applicable approach to analyze cases studies and real situations. This approach does not make any extraordinary demands on the artistic and dramatic talents of the teacher. As a result, most professors are capable of supervising the application of this method.

=== History of business cases ===
When Harvard Business School started operating in 1908, the faculty realized that there were no textbooks suitable for a graduate program in business. Their first solution to this problem involved interviewing leading practitioners of business and writing detailed accounts of what these managers were doing, based partly on the case method already in use at Harvard Law School. Of course, the professors could not present these cases as practices to be emulated, because there were no criteria available for determining what would succeed and what would not succeed. So the professors instructed their students to read the cases and to come to class prepared to discuss the cases and to offer recommendations for appropriate courses of action. The basic outlines of this method still operate in business-school curricula as of 2016.

== Other approaches ==
In contrast to the case method some schools use a skills-based approach in teaching business. This approach emphasizes quantitative methods, in particular operations research, management information systems, statistics, organizational behavior, modeling and simulation, and decision science. The leading institution in this method is the Tepper School of Business at Carnegie Mellon University. The goal is to provide students a set of tools that will prepare them to tackle and solve problems.

Another important approach used in business schools is the use of business games that are used in different disciplines such as business, economics, management, etc. Some colleges are blending many of these approaches throughout their degree programs and even blending the method of delivery for each of these approaches. A study by Inside Higher Ed and the Babson Survey Research Group shows that there is still disagreement as to the effectiveness of the approaches but the reach and accessibility is proving to be more and more appealing. Liberal arts colleges in the United States like New England College, Wesleyan University, and Bryn Mawr College are now offering complete online degrees in many business curricula despite the controversy that surrounds the learning method.

There are also several business schools which still rely on the lecture method to give students a basic business education. Lectures are generally given from the professor's point of view, and rarely require interaction from the students unless note-taking is required. Lecture as a method of teaching in business schools has been criticized by experts for reducing the incentive and individualism in the learning experience.

== Executive education ==
In addition to teaching students, many business schools run Executive Education programs. These may be either open programs or company-specific programs. Executives may also acquire an MBA title in an Executive MBA program within university of business or from top ranked business schools. Many business schools seek close co-operation with business.

== Accreditation ==
There are three main accreditation agencies for business schools in the United States: ACBSP, AACSB, and the IACBE. In Europe, the EQUIS business school accreditation system is run by the EFMD, which sometimes applies the more narrow EPAS label to specific courses. The AMBA accredits MBA programmes and other post-graduate business programmes in 75 countries; its sister organisation the Business Graduates Association (BGA), accredits business schools, based on the impact they make on students, employers and the wider community and society, in terms of ethics and responsible management practices. Triple accreditation is used to indicate that a school has been accredited by these three bodies: AACSB, AMBA, and EQUIS. About 1% of business schools are triple-accredited.

== Global business school and MBA rankings ==
Each year, organizations and publications such as Bloomberg Businessweek (US), Corporate Knights (Canada), Eduniversal (France), Financial Times (UK) and Quacquarelli Symonds (UK) publish rankings of business schools and MBA programs that, while sometimes controversial in their methodologies, nevertheless can directly influence the prestige of schools that achieve high scores. Academic research is also considered to be an important feature and popular way to gauge the prestige of business schools. Business schools share the common purpose of developing global managerial talent and to this end, business schools are encouraged to accelerate global engagement strategies on the foundations of collaboration and innovation.

== Tuition ==
In Europe, a bachelor's degree is tuition-free at public intuitions in several countries: Austria, Cyprus, Czech Republic, Denmark, Estonia, Finland, Germany, Greece, Malta, Montenegro, Norway, Poland, Scotland, Slovakia, Slovenia, Sweden, Turkey. In the German education system, most universities do not charge tuition, except for some executive MBA programs. French tuition fees are capped based on the level of education pursued, from €183 (US $207) per year for undergraduate and up to €388 (US$438) for doctorates. Tuition fees in the United Kingdom were introduced in 1998 and are £9,250 annually for undergraduate courses for home students in England, with higher fees for students who are not domiciled in the UK. Postgraduate courses in the UK often have higher fees, and many universities charge a premium rate for MBAs. All private and autonomous institutions in Europe charge tuition.

In the United States, most public colleges and universities charge tuition. According to the CollegeBoard, the average cost for an out-of-state, or international student, to attend a public four year university in 2020 was $38,330 (€33,960), while the average in-state cost was $21,950 (€19,448). Two year public universities, such as a community colleges, charge $3,730 (€3,305) on average for in-state students, but these institutions usually do not offer Bachelors or MBA degrees. Private institutions in the United States all charge tuition, often considerably more than their public counterparts.

== Lists ==
- List of business schools in Africa
- List of business schools in Australia
- List of business schools in Asia
- List of business schools in Canada
- List of business schools in Chile
- List of business schools in Europe
- List of business schools in India
- List of business schools in New Zealand
- List of business schools in South Africa
- List of business schools in Switzerland
- List of business schools in Taiwan
- List of business schools in the United States
  - List of Ivy League business schools
  - List of M7 business schools
  - List of United States graduate business school rankings
- Triple accreditation § Schools by country

== See also ==
- Accreditation Council for Business Schools and Programs
- Association to Advance Collegiate Schools of Business
- Association of MBAs
- Case competition
- Central and East European Management Development Association
- Decision Sciences Institute
- European Foundation for Management Development
- International Assembly for Collegiate Business Education
