= Nagoya University of Commerce & Business =

Japanese business school

Coordinates: 35°09′07.71″N 136°59′41.34″E

Nagoya University of Commerce and Business
- 名古屋商科大学
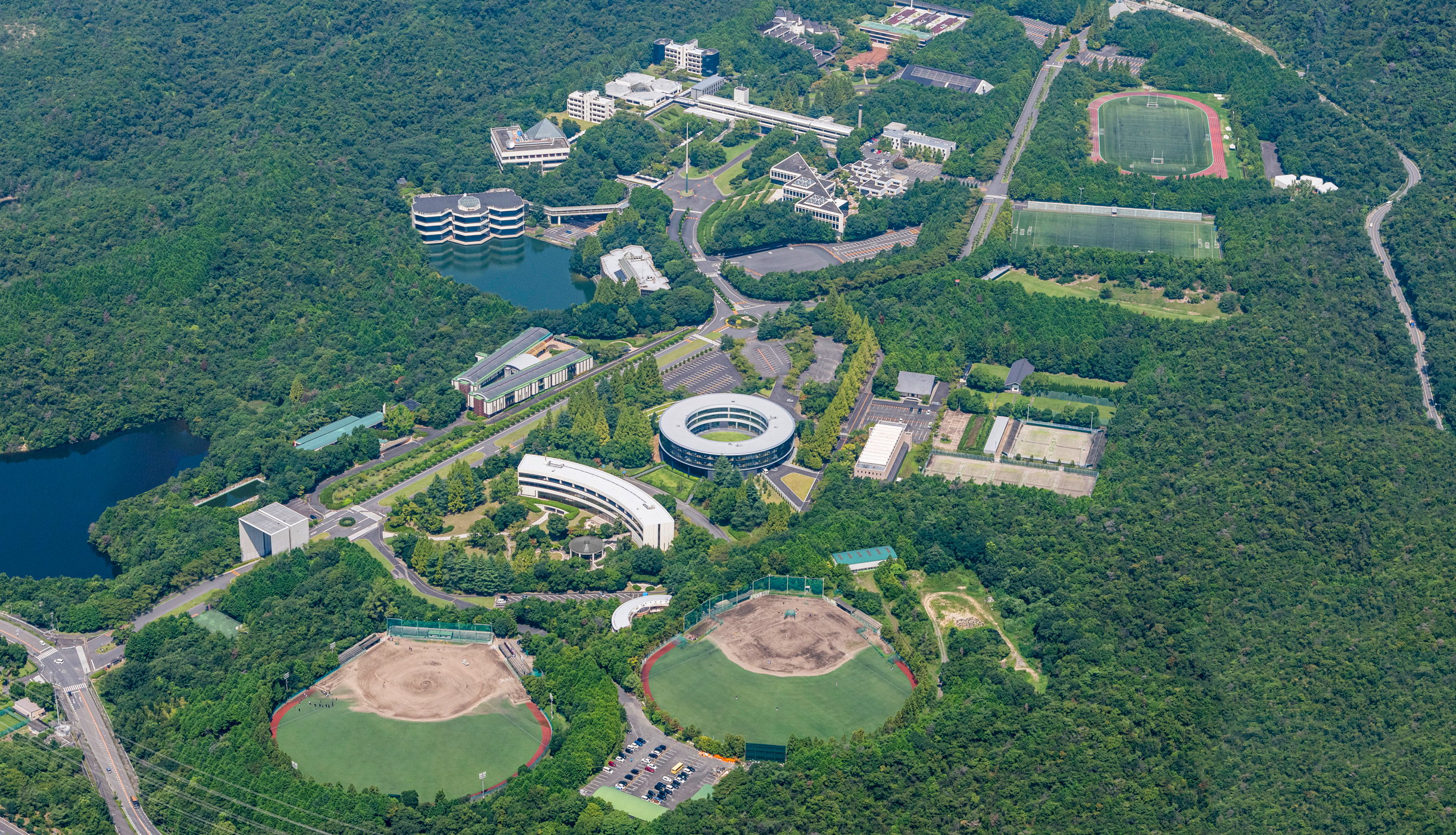
- Main campus
- Motto: Frontier Spirit
- Type: Private
- Established: 1935; university from 1953
- Affiliations: AACSB
- Chancellor: Hiroyuki Kurimoto
- Students: 3120
- Location: Nisshin, Aichi Prefecture, Japan
- Campus: Nisshin, Nagoya
- Colors: Green & Gold
- Website: www.nucba.ac.jp/en

Nagoya University of Commerce & Business (Japanese: 名古屋商科大学, Nagoya shōka daigaku) is a Japanese private university in Nisshin, Aichi, in the Tokai region of Japan.

== History ==
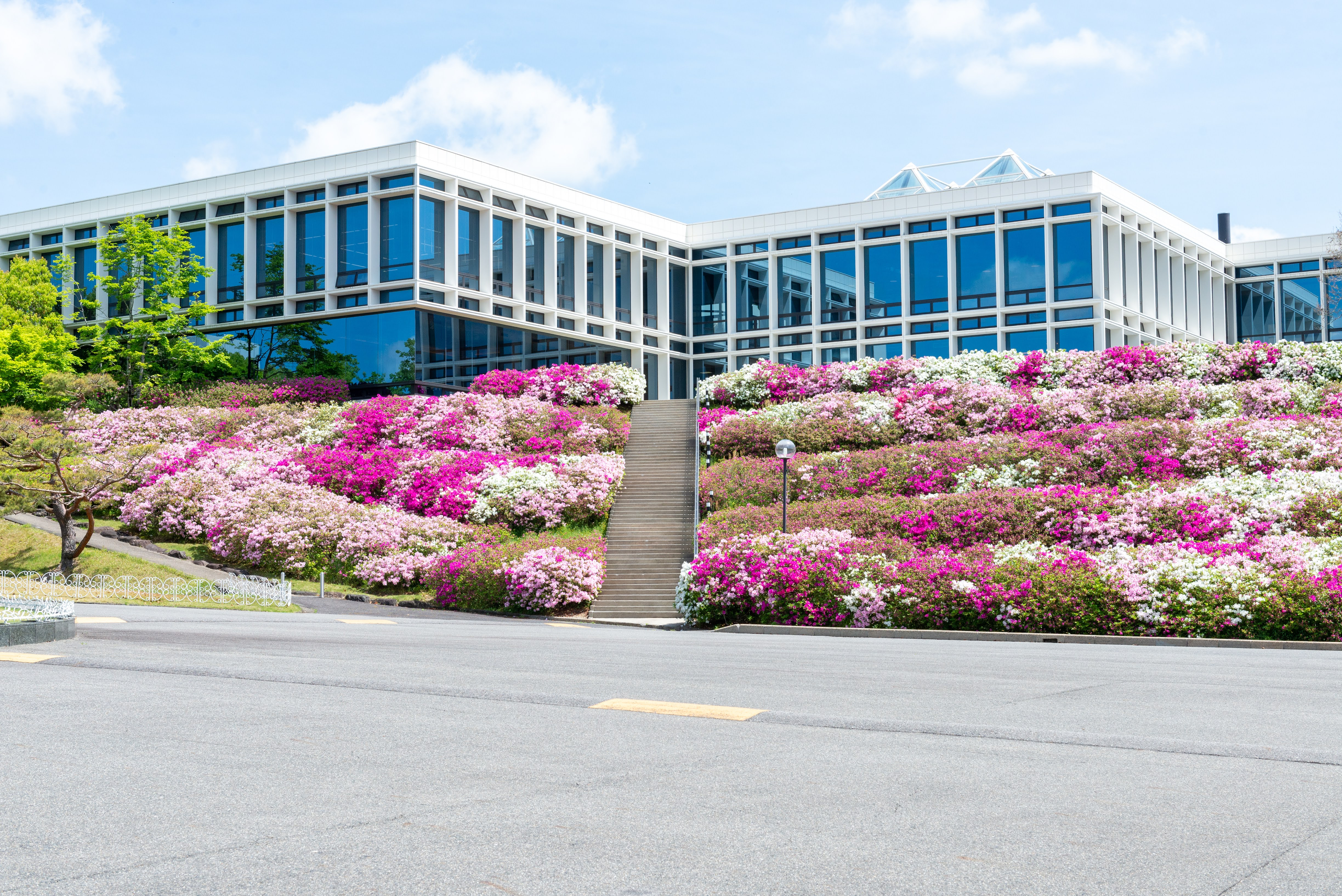
NUCB Nisshin Campus Community Pavilion

The school was established by Yuichi Kurimoto in 1953. In 1968 it moved to Nisshin, in the Tokai region. In 2001, a second campus was opened in downtown Nagoya.

- 1953 - University founded, Faculty of Commerce established (BSc in Commerce)
- 1968 - Nisshin campus established
- 1976 - Computer Center opened
- 1978 - Central Information Center opened
- 1981 - Language Education Center opened
- 1986 - Campus LAN completed
- 1990 - Business School (Graduate School of Management) established
- 1996 - Study abroad program inaugurated
- 1998 - Faculty of Global Studies established (BA)
- 2000 - Millennium Gate completed
- 2001 - Faculty of Management established (BSc in Management)
- 2003 - 50th Anniversary Pole completed
- 2005 - Gap Year Program inaugurated
- 2006 - Accredited by AACSB International
- 2008 - Faculty of Economics established (BSc in Economics)
- 2012 - International Career Advancement Program started
- 2016 - BBA established
- 2018 - Global BBA established
- 2022 - PIM Network membership

=== Accreditation ===
The school has been accredited by the Association to Advance Collegiate Schools of Business since 2006. The NUCB Business School (graduate school of management) is the only school in Japan to be triple-accredited.

It is also accredited by the Japan University Accreditation Association.

== Partner School ==
The school became the 68th member of the Partnership in International Management network, an international consortium of leading business schools. Founded in 1973 by École des Hautes Études Commerciales (HEC), New York University (NYU), and London Business School (LBS), PIM was established to address academic and institutional barriers to international exchange.
