= WSB University, Warsaw =

Higher education institution in Warsaw, Poland

Coordinates: 52°16′17″N 21°00′54″E

WSB University in Warsaw
- Akademia WSB w Warszawie
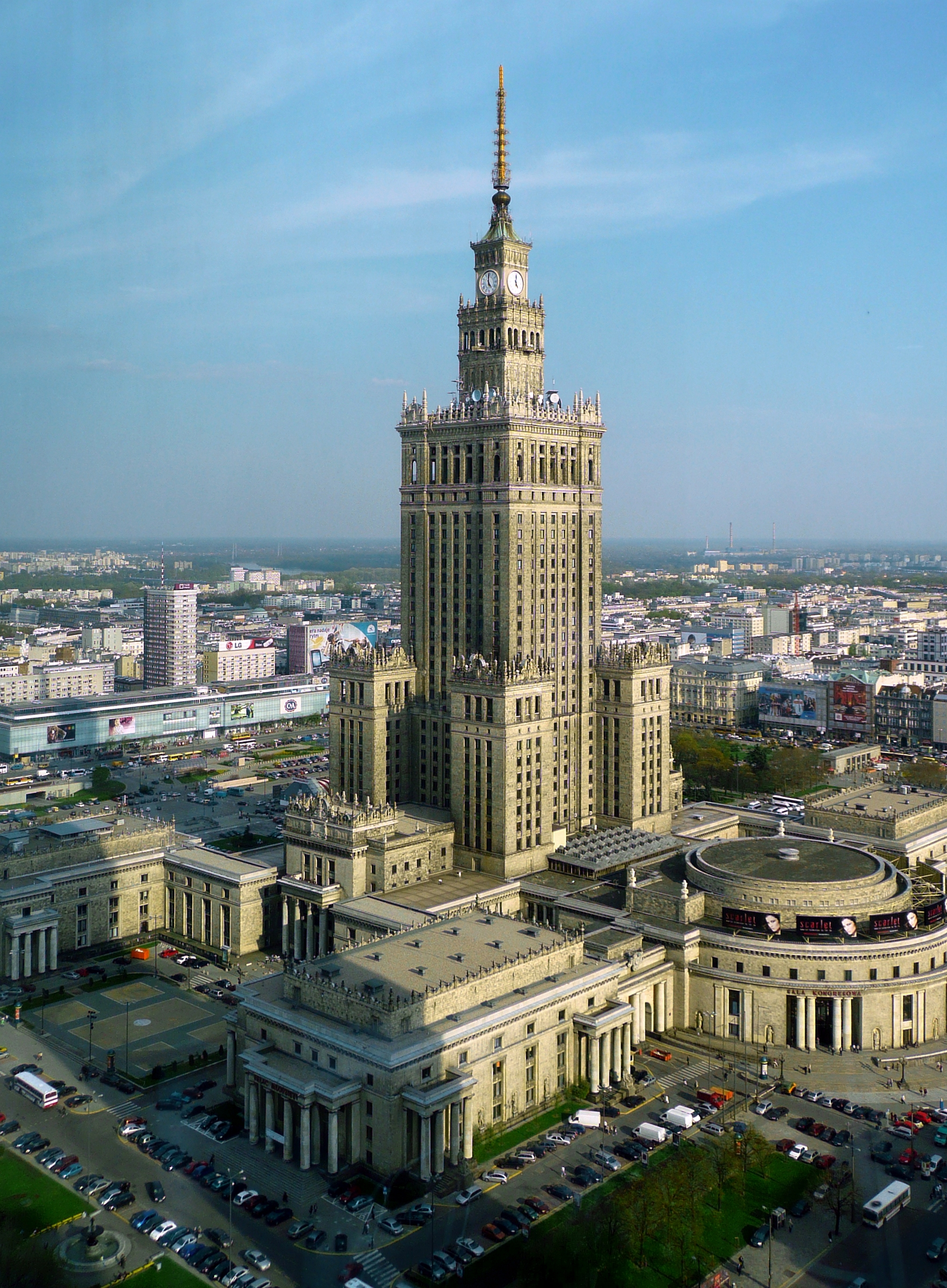
- The Palace of Culture and Science, where the university is located
- Type: Private
- Established: 2001
- Rector: Zdzisław Gajewski
- Address: Palace of Culture and Science, 8th floor, 1 Defilad Sq, 00-901 Warsaw, Warsaw, Masovia, Poland
- Campus: Urban (Palace of Culture and Science)
- Affiliations: Erasmus +
- Website: https://wsb.edu.pl/warszawa

WSB University in Warsaw (Akademia WSB Warszawa, formerly Wszechnica Polska Szkoła Wyższa w Warszawie, Wszechnica Polska – Szkoła Wyższa Towarzystwa Wiedzy Powszechnej) is a private university located in Warsaw, Poland.

== History ==
WSB University in Warsaw was established in 2001 as Wszechnica Polska University. The university continues the educational aims included in programmes of interwar Free Polish University and post-war activity of the Common Knowledge Society (Towarzystwo Wiedzy Powszechnej). In 2010 the university was formally entitled to grant MA degrees in Pedagogy and Philology; in 2013 – in Internal Security and Finances and Accounting. Within 20 years of functioning of the university about 10000 students of BA, MA and postgraduate studies have completed their education earning their titles and academic certificates.

The university is listed in the official registry of private higher education institutions (registration No. 195) of the Ministry of Science and Higher Education. It runs full-time and extramural courses within BA studies (1st cycle studies - the title of Bachelor) and extramural courses within MA studies (2nd cycle studies – the title of Master). The central location of the university is the Palace of Culture and Science in Warsaw. The university has its own educational facility located at 10 Karmelicka St. On August 1, 2025, the university merged with the WSB University, becoming the tenth location of the University.

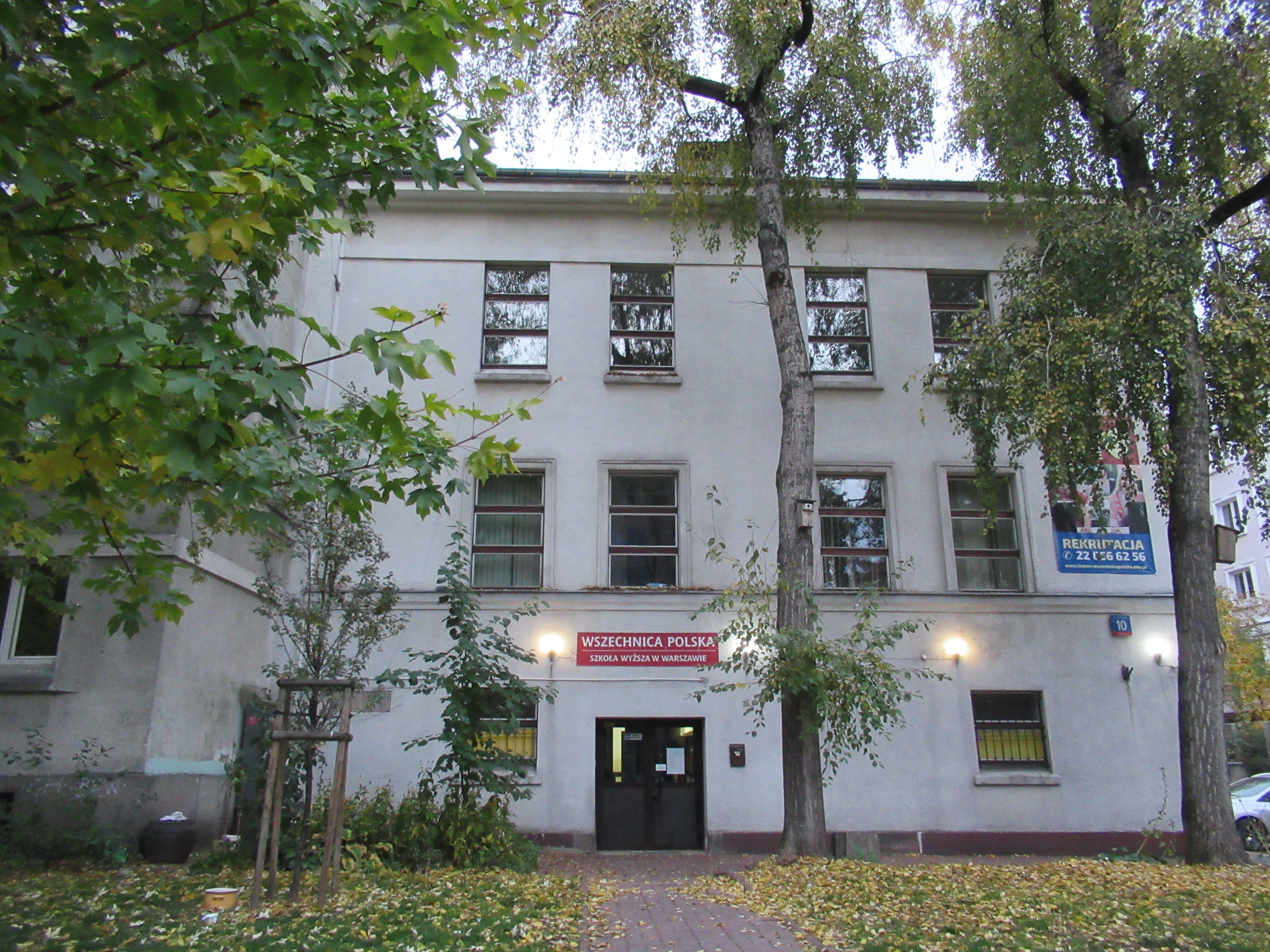
Educational facility located at 10 Karmelicka St.

== Education ==
Students are enrolled into the university based on their secondary school final exam results. During the studies foreign languages (English, Spanish, German and Russian) and Information Technology are taught. The university organises Polish Language and Polish Culture courses for foreign students.

The faculty offers first-cycle (bachelor’s) programmes, second-cycle (master’s) programmes, long-cycle master's studies, postgraduate studies and MBA programmes, as well as degree programmes taught in English and participation in the International Doctoral Academy (PhD).

=== First-cycle (bachelor’s) studies ===
Degree programmes:

- Administracja – specialisations: „Doradztwo administracyjne i obsługa cudzoziemców”, „Sztuczna inteligencja w administracji”, „Zarządzanie publiczne i e-administracja”.
- Bezpieczeństwo narodowe – specialisations: „Bezpieczeństwo cyfrowe i przeciwdziałanie cyberzagrożeniom”, „Kryminologia z kryminalistyką”, „Organizacja i funkcjonowanie służb publicznych”.
- Filologia angielska – specialisations: „Intercultural Communication in Business and Advertising”, „Translation”.
- Filologia hiszpańska (iberystyka) – specialisations: „Język dyplomacji i instytucji międzynarodowych”, „Komunikacja językowa w biznesie i administracji”, „Tłumaczenia”.
- Finance and accounting (Finanse i rachunkowość) – specialisations: „Finanse przedsiębiorstw”, „Rachunkowość, podatki i audyt finansowy”, „Technologie cyfrowe w finansach”.
- Zarządzanie – specialisations: „E-marketing i e-commerce”, „Psychologia w biznesie”, „Sztuczna inteligencja i analiza danych”, „Zarządzanie zasobami ludzkimi”, „Zrównoważone zarządzanie organizacją i raportowanie ESG”.

=== Second-cycle (master’s) studies ===
Degree programmes:

- Public administration (Administracja) – specialisations: „Administracja publiczna”, „Administracja w biznesie”, „Zrównoważony rozwój i ESG w administracji”.
- Bezpieczeństwo wewnętrzne – specialisations: „Kryminalistyka i profilowanie kryminalne”, „Sztuczna inteligencja i analiza danych w bezpieczeństwie”, „Zarządzanie i dowodzenie w sytuacjach kryzysowych”.
- English studies (Filologia angielska) – specialisations: „Język dyplomacji i instytucji międzynarodowych”, „Komunikacja językowa w biznesie i administracji”, „Tłumaczenia”.
- Hispanic studies (Filologia hiszpańska, iberystyka) – specialisations: „Język dyplomacji i instytucji międzynarodowych”, „Komunikacja językowa w biznesie i administracji”, „Tłumaczenia”.
- Finance and accounting (Finanse i rachunkowość) – specialisations: „Doradztwo podatkowe”, „Finanse i rachunkowość przedsiębiorstw”, „Informatyka w zarządzaniu finansami”.

=== Long-cycle master’s studies ===
- Pedagogika przedszkolna i wczesnoszkolna (pre-school and early-school pedagogy).

=== Degree programmes taught in English ===
Study in English offerings on the Warsaw campus (first- and second-cycle studies):

- First-cycle (bachelor’s) studies – Management – specialisations:
  - Bachelor's – Business Management | WARSAW,
  - Bachelor's – Computer Science and IT in Management | WARSAW,
  - Bachelor's – Digital Marketing and Sales Management | WARSAW.
- Second-cycle (master’s) studies – Management – specialisations:
  - Master's – International Business | WARSAW,
  - Master's – Sustainability Development Manager | WARSAW.

=== Postgraduate studies and MBA programmes ===
The Warsaw branch participates in the university-wide offer of postgraduate and MBA studies. According to the university, WSB University offers more than 100–150 postgraduate programmes (across different locations), including MBA programmes and ACCA certification tracks; some of these programmes are available online and thus also accessible to students based in Warsaw.

On the Warsaw recruitment website, the following thematic groups of postgraduate and MBA studies are listed, among others:

- MBA study programmes:
  - „ACCA po polsku – zarządzanie finansami i rachunkowość w środowisku międzynarodowym (Partner: EY)” – online,
  - „ACCA Strategic Professional” – online,
  - „Executive MBA dla branży wodociągowej” – online,
  - „Executive MBA in English” – classes held in Warsaw,
  - „Master of Business Administration (Partner: EY)” – online,
  - „MBA w ochronie zdrowia (Partner: EY)” – online,
  - „MBA w ochronie zdrowia dla pielęgniarek i położnych (Partner: EY)” – online.
- Postgraduate studies:
  - Język polski jako drugi (two specialisations focused on work with multicultural groups or classes in pre-school and early-school education),
  - Studia z zakresu zielonych kompetencji (including „Menedżer Jakości – zielone kompetencje”, „Menedżer logistyki – zielone kompetencje”, „Menedżer zielonych zmian i ESG / VSME”, „Menedżerskie studia podyplomowe – poziom MBA – zielone kompetencje”, „Zarządzanie bezpieczeństwem i higieną pracy – zielone kompetencje”, „Zarządzanie projektami – zielone kompetencje”, „Zrównoważony rozwój i ESG”),
  - Studia dla samorządu i administracji (including „Administracja publiczna”, „Akademia Profesjonalnego Mediatora – mediacje sądowe i pozasądowe”, „Finanse i rachunkowość budżetowa samorządu terytorialnego…”, „Prawo zamówień publicznych”, „Zarządzanie szkodami łowieckimi”),
  - Studia informatyczne (including „Akademia e-marketingu”, „Cloud Computing”, „Data Scientist – Big Data i systemy zaawansowanej analizy danych”, „Frontend Developer – programowanie nowoczesnych aplikacji webowych”, „Inżynieria sztucznej inteligencji”, „Sieci komputerowe i Internet Rzeczy”, „Zarządzanie cyberbezpieczeństwem”),
  - Studia oświatowe (including a number of qualifying programmes in special education, „Bibliotekoznawstwo”, „Język angielski w edukacji wczesnoszkolnej i przedszkolnej”, „Neurologopedia”, „Surdologopedia”, „Zarządzanie w oświacie”),
  - Studia z zakresu HR i kadr (including „HR Business Partner”, „Kadry i płace w praktyce”, „Prawo pracy i ubezpieczeń społecznych”, „Psychologia przywództwa”, „Zarządzanie kapitałem ludzkim”),
  - Studia z zakresu bezpieczeństwa (including „Compliance Officer – audyt i compliance w przedsiębiorstwie”, „Ochrona danych osobowych w administracji i biznesie – Inspektor Ochrony Danych”, „Zarządzanie bezpieczeństwem i higieną pracy”),
  - Studia z zakresu coachingu (including „Akademia Profesjonalnego Coachingu”, „Business Development – coaching, konsulting, mentoring”, „Doradztwo zawodowe i personalne z elementami coachingu”),
  - Studia z zakresu finansów (including „Controlling i audyt w przedsiębiorstwie”, „Doradca podatkowy”, „Rachunkowość i finanse”),
  - Studia z zakresu handlu (including „Menedżer Sprzedaży 4.0”),
  - Studia z zakresu medycyny i fizjoterapii (including „Koordynator medyczny”),
  - Studia z zakresu zarządzania (including „Akademia Lean Management”, „Menedżer Jakości”, „Menedżer logistyki”, „Menedżerskie studia podyplomowe – poziom MBA”, „Zarządzanie projektami”).

=== International Doctoral Academy (PhD) ===
The doctoral offer of WSB University includes the International Doctoral Academy, a doctoral programme conducted in English, delivered mainly online and aimed at international participants, including graduates and students of the Warsaw branch of the university.

== International Exchange and Internationalization ==
WSB University in Warsaw, as part of the WSB University network, implements the European Credit Transfer and Accumulation System (ECTS) since 2007 and participates in the Erasmus+ programme since 2014. The university organizes the annual InterUni Forum for Internationalization of Higher Education, addressing student mobility, international partnerships, cross-border research, and global curriculum development.

=== Erasmus+ Programme ===
Under the current Erasmus+ programme (2021-2027), students and staff can participate in international mobility including study exchanges and work placements. The programme focuses on social inclusion, green and digital transitions, and democratic participation. Learning mobility (KA1) and cooperation partnerships (KA2) are available, with exchanges lasting 2–12 months for studies or 5–30 days for short-term programmes.

=== International Partnerships ===
The university collaborates with over 200 partner universities worldwide, maintaining bilateral agreements, student exchange programmes, and double degree opportunities across Europe, Asia, and other regions.

=== International Projects ===
European Union-funded Erasmus+ projects include:

- Enter-CBL (Boosting Entrepreneurial Mindset of Students with Challenge-Based Learning), project no. 2023-1-PL01-KA220-HED-000160857
- VR4Skills (training framework for internationalization leaders enhanced by Virtual Reality), project no. 2022-1-PL01-KA220-HED-000089035
- EQUATION (Equality Through Accreditation) promoting gender equality in higher education
- SPARK-COIL (Academic Agility, Resilience, and Knowledge Exchange through Collaborative Online International Learning), project no. 101178638

=== International Accreditations ===
International accreditations include:

- CEEMAN IQA (International Quality Accreditation), 2020-2026
- EUR-ACE® Label from KAUT (Accreditation Commission of Technical Universities)
- HR Excellence in Research (European Commission)
- Business School Impact System (BSIS IMPACT) certificate
