= Łukasz Sułkowski =

Polish professor

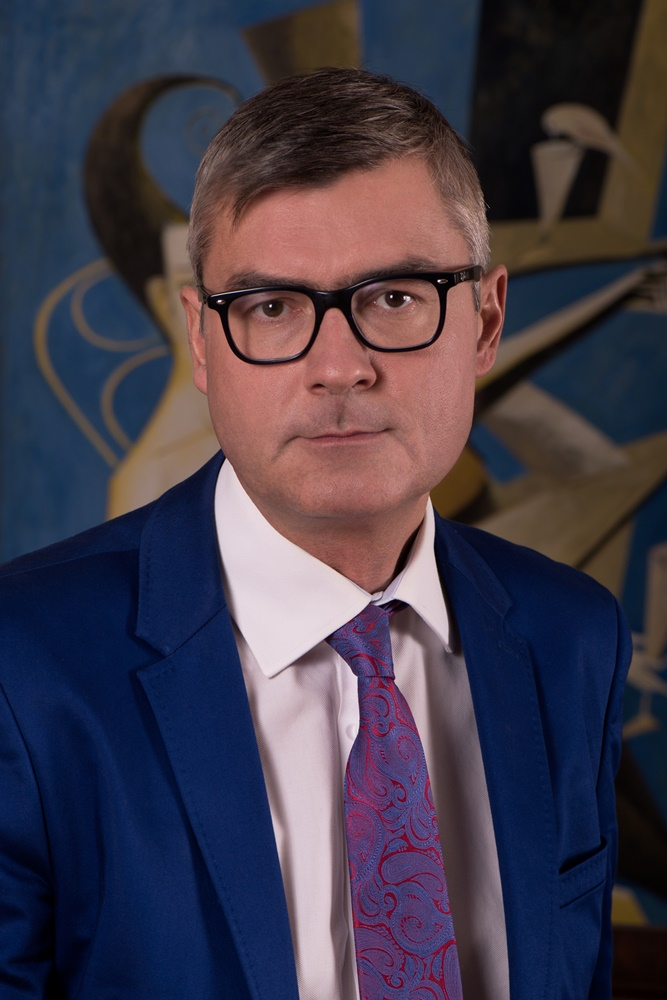
- Born: 18 September 1972 (age 53); Łódź, Poland
- Education: University of Łódź; Wrocław University of Economics; Jagiellonian University
- Scientific career
- Fields: Management studies, organizational theory, higher education (management)
- Workplaces: Jagiellonian University; WSB University; University of Social Sciences
- Website: Official website

Łukasz Sułkowski (born 18 September 1972) is a Polish professor of economic sciences, specializing in management sciences. Currently employed in the Institute of Public Affairs of the Jagiellonian University, former vice-president for international affairs of the Polish Accreditation Committee, President of WSB University. and Director of Clark University Branch Campus at University of Social Sciences in Poland. He is also the President of PCG Polska.

== Career ==
Łukasz Sułkowski graduated from Nicolaus Copernicus High School in Łódź and got a master's degree in sociology at the University of Łódź. In 1999 he obtained his PhD in economic sciences, in 2003 he got the DSc degree, and in 2010 he became professor of economics at the Wrocław University of Economics. In 2014 he received the DSc degree in humanities at the Jagiellonian University.

At the Jagiellonian University, he heads the Department of Management of Higher Education Institutions at the Institute of Public Affairs. He has also been affiliated with the University of Social Sciences (SAN).

From 2012 to 2018 he was a member of the Polish Accreditation Committee (Polska Komisja Akredytacyjna, PKA), including responsibilities related to international cooperation.

== Selected publications ==
According to the Polish researchers’ database Ludzie Nauki, as of 17 December 2025, 387 publications authored by him were registered and 511 in ResearchGate, mainly in the area of management and theory of organizations.

=== Academic books ===
- Sułkowski, Łukasz (2017), Fuzje uczelni. Czy w szaleństwie jest metoda, Warszawa: Wydawnictwo Naukowe PWN, ISBN 978-83-01-19702-5.
- Sułkowski, Łukasz (2016), Kultura akademicka. Koniec utopii, Warszawa: Wydawnictwo Naukowe PWN, ISBN 978-83-01-18524-4.
- Sułkowski, Łukasz, Chmielecki, Michał (red.) (2017), Metaphors in Management – Blend of Theory and Practice, Series: New Horizons in Management Sciences, Volume 5, Frankfurt am Main: Peter Lang International, ISSN 2194-153X (online), ISBN 978-3-631-71611-3.
- Sułkowski, Łukasz (red.) (2013), Epistemology of Management, Series: New Horizons in Management Sciences, Volume 2, Frankfurt am Main: Peter Lang International, ISBN 978-3-631-64013-5.
- Sułkowski, Łukasz (2012), Epistemologia i metodologia zarządzenia, Warszawa: Polskie Wydawnictwo Ekonomiczne (PWE), ISBN 978-83-208-2027-0.
- Sułkowski, Łukasz (2012), Neodarwinism in Organization and Management, Series: New Horizons in Management Sciences, Volume 1, Frankfurt am Main: Peter Lang International, ISBN 978-3-631-63750-0.
- Sułkowski, Łukasz (2009), Firmy rodzinne – jak osiągnąć sukces w sztafecie pokoleń, Warszawa: Wydawnictwo Poltext, ISBN 978-83-7561-185-4.

=== Scientific papers and chapters ===
- Sułkowski, Łukasz (2017), The Culture of Control in the Contemporary University, [in:] The Future of University Education, Izak, Michał, Kostera, Monika, Zawadzki, Michał (ed.), seria: Palgrave Critical University Studies, pp. 85–108, Cham: Springer International Publishing, ISBN 978-3-319-46893-8.
- Sułkowski, Łukasz (2017), Social Capital, Trust and Intercultural Interactions, [in:] Intercultural Interactions in the Multicultural Workplace. Traditional and Positive Organizational Scholarship, Rozkwitalska, Małgorzata, Sułkowski, Łukasz, Magala, Slawomir (ed.), pp. 155–171, Cham: Springer International Publishing, ISBN 978-3-319-39770-2.
- Sułkowski, Łukasz, Chmielecki, Michał (2017), Application of Neuroscience in Management, [in:] Neuroeconomic and Behavioral Aspects of Decision Making: Proceedings of the 2016 Computational Methods in Experimental Economics (CMEE) Conference, Nermend, Kesra, Łatuszyńska, Małgorzata (ed.), pp. 49–62, Cham: Springer International Publishing, ISBN 978-3-31962937-7.
- Sułkowski, Łukasz, Chmielecki, Michał (2017), Positive Cross-Cultural Scholarship Research,, [in:] Intercultural Interactions in the Multicultural Workplace. Traditional and Positive Organizational Scholarship, Rozkwitalska, Małgorzata, Sułkowski, Łukasz, Magala, Slawomir (ed.), pp. 19–35, Cham: Springer International Publishing, ISBN 978-3-319-39770-2.
- Sułkowski, Łukasz (2017), Understanding Organizational Intercultural Interactions in Corporations, [in:] Intercultural Interactions in the Multicultural Workplace. Traditional and Positive Organizational Scholarship, Rozkwitalska, Małgorzata, Sułkowski, Łukasz, Magala, Slawomir (ed.), pp. 3–17, Cham: Springer International Publishing, ISBN 978-3-319-39770-2.
- Sułkowski, Łukasz, Kaczorowska–Spychalska Dominika (2016), Management of Enterprise of the Future in the Ecosystem of the Internet of Things, [in:] Advances in Ergonomics of Manufacturing: Managing the Enterprise of the Future, Schlick, Christopher Marc, Trzcieliński, Stefan (ed.), pp. 179–191, Cham: Springer International Publishing, ISBN 978-3-319-41696-0 (druk), ISBN 978-3-319-41697-7 (online).
- Rozkwitalska, Malgorzata, Chmielecki, Michał, Przytuła, Sylwia, Sułkowski, Łukasz, Basińska, Beata, Aleksandra (2017), Intercultural interactions in multinational subsidiaries: employee accounts of „The dark side” and „The bright side” of Intercultural contacts, [in:] Baltic Journal of Management, Volume 12, Issue 2, pp. 214–239, Emerald Group Publishing Limited, ISSN 1746-5265.
- Chmielecki, Michał, Sułkowski, Łukasz (2017), Goal vs. Relationship-Based Approach. A Comparative Study between American, Chinese, and Polish Negotiators, [in:] Approaches to conflict. Theoretical, Interpersonal, and Discursive Dynamics, Barbara Lewandowska-Tomaszczyk, Paul A. Wilson, Stephen M. Croucher, Lexington Books (ed.), pp. 93–110, London: Lexington Books, ISBN 978-1-4985-3545-8.
- Raczkowski, Konrad, Sułkowski, Łukasz, Fijałkowska, Justyna (2016), Comparative Critical Review of Corporate Social Responsibility Business Managenent Models, [in:] International Journal of Contemporary Management, Volume 15, Number 2/2016, pp. 123–150, Kraków: Wydawnictwo Uniwersytet Jagielloński Wydział Zarządzania i Komunikacji Społecznej, ISSN 2449-8920, ISSN 1643-5494.
- Sułkowski, Łukasz (2013), Paradygmaty nauk o zarządzaniu, [in:] International Journal of Contemporary Management Quarterly 2/2013, Wydanie I, Kożuch, Barbara (ed.), pp. 17–26, Kraków: Wydawnictwo Uniwersytet Jagielloński, Wydział Zarządzania i Komunikacji Społecznej, ISSN 1643-5494.
- Sułkowski, Łukasz (2012), Meta-paradigmatic Cognitive Perspective in Management Studies, [in:] Argumenta Oeconomica, Tom 22, nr 2, pp. 33–51, Wrocław: Wydawnictwo Uniwersytetu Ekonomicznego we Wrocławiu, ISSN 1233-5835.
- Sułkowski, Łukasz (2014), From Fundamentalistic to Pluralistic Epistemology of Organizational Culture, [in:] Tamara – Journal of Critical Organization Inquiry, Volume 12, Issue 4, 12/2014, pp. 59–77, Wydawnictwo Koźmiński University, ISSN 1532-5555.
- Sułkowski, Łukasz (2012), Organizational Culture and the Trend of Critical Management Studies,, [in:] Journal of Intercultural Management, Tom 4, Nr 1/2012, pp. 91–101, Łódź: Wydawnictwo Społeczna Akademia Nauk, ISSN 2080-0150.
- Sułkowski, Łukasz (2014), The functionalist understanding of culture in management,, [in:] Organizacja i Kierowanie, nr 1B (160)/2014, Cyfert, Szymon (red.), pp. 25–36, Warszawa: Wydawnictwo Komitet Nauk Organizacji i Zarządzania Polskiej Akademii Nauk PAN, Szkoła Główna Handlowa w Warszawie, ISSN 0137-5466.
- Sułkowski, Łukasz (2013), Metodologia zarządzania – od fundamentalizmu do pluralizmu, [in:] Podstawy metodologii badań w naukach o zarządzaniu, Wydanie II rozszerzone i uaktualnione, Czakon, Wojciech (ed.), pp. 26–46, Warszawa: Wolters Kluwer, ISBN 978-83-264-4503-3.
- Sułkowski, Łukasz (2013), Paradygmaty i teorie w naukach o zarządzaniu, [in:] Podstawy metodologii badań w naukach o zarządzaniu – wydanie II rozszerzone i uaktualnione, Czakon, Wojciech (ed.), pp. 268–290, Warszawa: Wolters Kluwer, ISBN 978-83-264-4503-3.
- Sułkowski, Łukasz (2009), Interpretative Approach in Management Sciences, [in:] Argumenta Oeconomica, nr 2(23)/2009, pp. 127–149, Wrocław: Wydawnictwo Uniwersytetu Ekonomicznego we Wrocławiu, ISSN 1233-5835.
- Sułkowski, Łukasz, Seliga, Robert (2009), Application of Marketing Communication in the Work of General Practitioners, [in:] Clinical and Experimental Medical Letters, Vol. 50, Supl. A 2009, Okoński, Piotr (ed.), pp. 15, Warszawa: Wydawnictwo Medycyna Plus, e-ISSN 2329-0072.

=== Academic books ===
- Rozkwitalska, Małgorzata, Sułkowski, Łukasz, Magala, Slawomir (ed.) (2017), Intercultural Interactions in the Multicultural Workplace. Traditional and Positive Organizational Scholarship, Cham: Wydawnictwo Springer International Publishing, ISBN 978-3-319-39770-2.
- Sułkowski, Łukasz (ed.) (2016), Management and Culture of the University, Series: New Horizons in Management Sciences, Volume 6, Frankfurt am Main: Peter Lang International, ISBN 978-3-631-71804-9.
- Raczkowski, Konrad, Sułkowski, Łukasz (ed.) (2014), Tax Management and Tax Evasion, Series: Horizons in Management Sciences, Volume 4, Frankfurt am Main: Wydawnictwo Peter Lang International, ISBN 978-3631651902.
- Sułkowski, Łukasz, Ignatowski, Grzegorz (ed.) (2017), Komunikacja i zarządzanie międzykulturowe. Współczesne wyzwania prawno-organizacyjne, Warszawa: Wydawnictwo Difin, ISBN 978-83-8085-497-0.
- Sułkowski, Łukasz, Kożuch, Barbara (ed.) (2015), Instrumentarium zarządzania publicznego, Warszawa: Difin, ISBN 978-83-7930-739-5.
- Otto, Jacek, Sułkowski, Łukasz (ed.) (2014), Metody zarządzania marketingowego, Warszawa: Wydawnictwo Difin, ISBN 978-83-7930-541-4.
- Sułkowski, Łukasz, Sikorski, Czesław (ed.) (2014), Metody zarządzania kulturą organizacyjną, Wydawnictwo Difin, ISBN 978-83-7930-551-3.
