= List of business schools in New Zealand =

The following is a list of business schools in New Zealand.

- Auckland University of Technology School of Business - Auckland University of Technology
- AUT School of Business
- University of Canterbury Business School - University of Canterbury
- EIT Faculty of Business and Computing - Eastern Institute of Technology
- Lincoln University Faculty of Commerce - Lincoln University
- Massey College of Business - Massey University
- Open Polytechnic of New Zealand School of Business - The Open Polytechnic of New Zealand
- Otago Business School - University of Otago
- University of Auckland Business School - University of Auckland
- University of Waikato Management School - University of Waikato
- Victoria Business School - Victoria University of Wellington
- Waikato Management School
- New Zealand College of Business
