= Zdzisława Dacko-Pikiewicz =

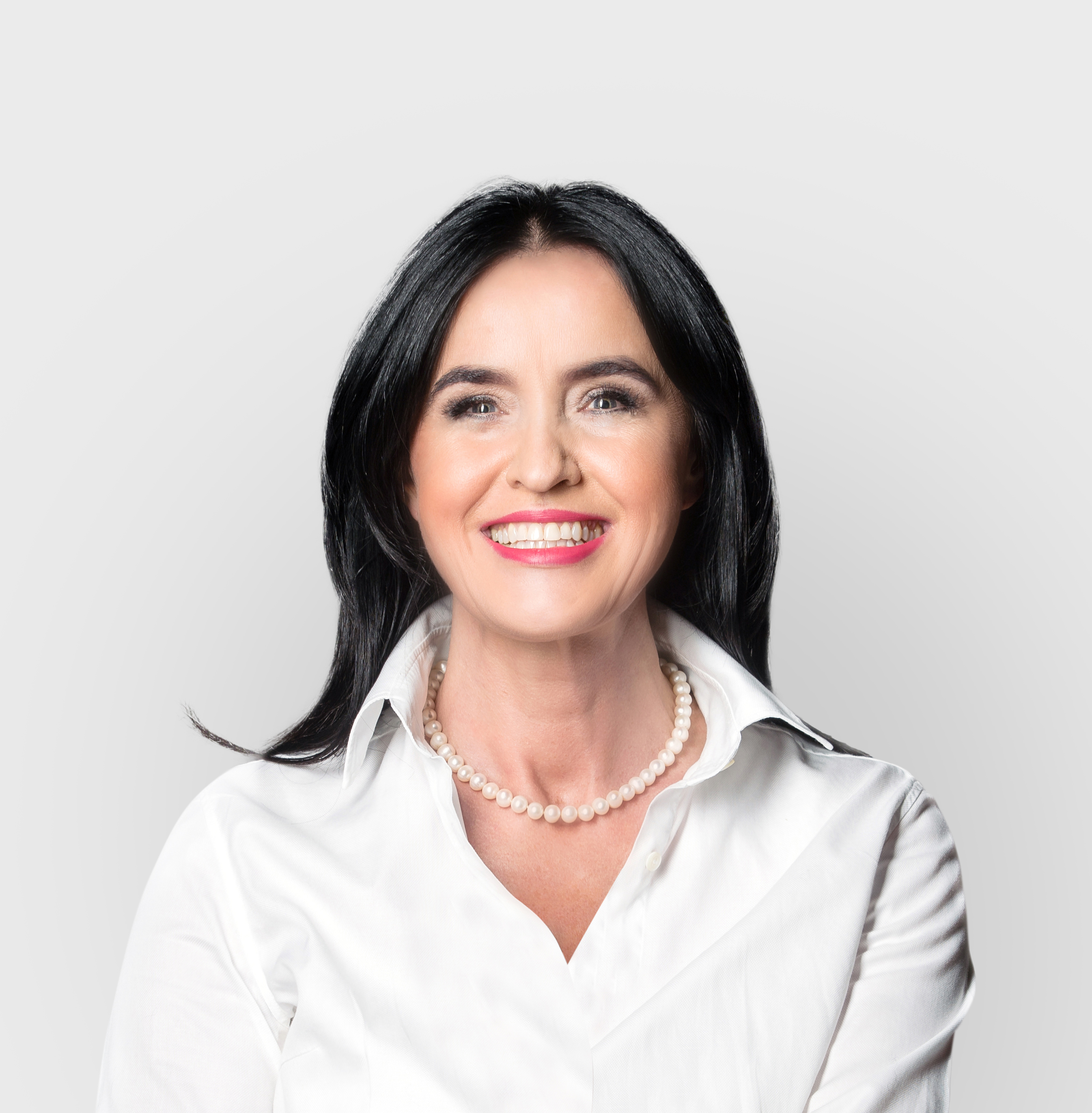
- Occupations: Academic administrator; researcher
- Awards: Gold Cross of Merit (2023); Silver Cross of Merit (2018); Bronze Cross of Merit (2007); Medal of the Commission of National Education (2004)

Academic background
- Education: Polish philology (1994); PhD (2002); habilitation (2019)
- Alma mater: Wyższa Szkoła Pedagogiczna w Rzeszowie (now University of Rzeszów); University of Silesia in Katowice; WSB University

Academic work
- Institutions: WSB University (Dąbrowa Górnicza)

Zdzisława Dacko-Pikiewicz is a Polish academic administrator and researcher. She has served as the rector of WSB University (formerly Wyższa Szkoła Biznesu in Dąbrowa Górnicza) since 2008. She obtained her habilitation (doktor habilitowany) in management and quality sciences in 2019.

== Biography ==
Dacko-Pikiewicz graduated in Polish philology from the Pedagogical University in Rzeszów (1994). She received a PhD in sociology in 2002 from the University of Silesia in Katowice.

She has been affiliated with WSB University since 1999 and has served as rector since 2008.

According to her institutional profile, she has also been involved in strengthening cooperation between academia and business, including work in the Chamber of Commerce and Industry in Katowice (RIG). She is listed as the chair of the Council of the Regional Chamber of Commerce and Industry in Katowice.

== Research ==
Her research interests include management and quality sciences, including (among others) family business, reputation management, competence management, knowledge transfer and innovation.

== Selected works ==
- Sułkowski, Łukasz; Dacko-Pikiewicz, Zdzisława; Szczepańska-Woszczyna, Katarzyna (2024). Philosophy and Leadership: An Evolution of Leadership from Ancient Times to the Digital Age. Routledge. doi:10.4324/9781003490470.
- Dacko-Pikiewicz, Zdzisława (2022). Reputation Management and Family Business. Routledge. doi:10.4324/9781003226215.
- Dacko-Pikiewicz, Zdzisława (2019). Zarządzanie reputacją firm rodzinnych. Warsaw: Wydawnictwo Naukowe PWN. ISBN 978-83-01-20646-8.
- Szczepańska-Woszczyna, Katarzyna; Dacko-Pikiewicz, Zdzisława (2018). Innovation Processes in the Social Space of the Organization. Nova Science Publishers. .
- Dacko-Pikiewicz, Zdzisława (2010). Zarządzanie marketingiem w szkole wyższej: komunikacja marketingowa uczelni. Dąbrowa Górnicza: Wydawnictwo Naukowe WSB.

== Awards and honours ==
- Gold Cross of Merit (2023).
- Silver Cross of Merit (2018).
- Bronze Cross of Merit (2007).
- Medal of the Commission of National Education (2004).
