= List of business schools in Chile =

There are more than 40 private and public universities in Chile that grant undergraduate and graduate degrees in business fields as administration, economics, finance, marketing and human resources.

The list below are the most popular national rankings based on business managers and recruiters surveys. All of the universities mentioned are accredited by the National Accreditation Commission (CNA) due to they have achieved the higher educational standards imposed by this government institution.

== Top ranked Business Schools in Chile ==
- Ranking top ten "Que Pasa Magazine" 2008 (All business schools)

Position	University	City	Private/Non-Private
1	Universidad de Chile	Santiago	NP
2	Universidad Adolfo Ibáñez	Santiago	P
3	Pontificia Universidad Católica de Chile	Santiago	NP
4	Universidad Tecnico Federico Santa Maria	Santiago	NP
5	Pontificia Universidad Catolica de Valparaiso	Valparaiso	NP
6	Universidad de Concepción	Concepcion	NP
7	Universidad Diego Portales	Santiago	P
8	Universidad de Santiago de Chile	Santiago	NP
9	Universidad de Los Andes	Santiago	P
10	Universidad del Desarrollo	Santiago	P

- Ranking Top Ten Private Business Schools with more future. "Que Pasa Magazine" 2008.

Position	University	City	Private/Non-Private
1	Universidad Adolfo Ibañez	Santiago	P
2	Universidad Diego Portales	Santiago	P
3	Universidad de Los Andes	Santiago	P
4	Universidad del Desarrollo	Santiago	P
5	Universidad Andres Bello	Santiago	P
6	Universidad Mayor	Santiago	P
7	Universidad Santo Tomas	Santiago	P
8	Universidad de Las Americas	Santiago	P
9	Universidad San Sebastián	Santiago	P
10	Universidad Central	Santiago	P

- Top business schools according to school reputation and potential students preferences. El Mercurio Online (Journal), 2007.

Position	University	City	Private/Non-Private
1	Universidad de Chile	Santiago	NP
2	Pontificia Universidad Catolica	Santiago	NP
3	Universidad de Santiago de Chile	Santiago	NP
4	Universidad Adolfo Ibañez	Santiago	P
5	Universidad Tecnico Federico Santa Maria	Santiago	NP
6	Universidad Diego Portales	Santiago	P
7	Universidad Mayor	Santiago	P
