= Executive MBA Council =

- Abbreviation: EMBA Council
- Formation: 1981
- Type: NGO
- Purpose: educational accreditation
- Location: Orange, California
- Executive Director: Michael Desiderio
- Website: http://www.emba.org

The Executive MBA Council is an educational accreditation council formed in 1981 to accredit schools of business offering EMBA degrees worldwide. The council was formed with the assistance of the Association to Advance Collegiate Schools of Business (AACSB International).

The council's stated mission is to promote the advancement of executive MBA worldwide through its partnerships, conference, and research and outreach activities. The EMBA Council is governed by a Board of Trustees, which consists mainly of the Deans or Program Directors of its business school members and sets goals on council initiatives.

The council is headquartered in Beckman Hall, Orange, California, United States.

As of May 2010, the Executive MBA Council has accredited 237 full business schools on six continents and 18 corporate members.

== Strategic Partners ==
- AACSB - Association to Advance Collegiate Schools of Business International
- Association of MBAs (AMBA)
- Central and East European Management Development Association
- European Foundation for Management Development (EFMD)
- Graduate Management Admission Council (GMAC)

== See also ==
- Regional accreditation
- Accreditation Council for Business Schools and Programs (ACBSP)
- Association of MBAs (AMBA)
- European Quality Improvement System (EQUIS)
