= Central and East European Management Development Association =

Organization

- Abbreviation: CEEMAN
- Formation: 1993
- Type: NGO
- Purpose: Accelerating growth in quality of management development & Educational accreditation
- Headquarters: Bled (Slovenia)
- Location: International
- Region served: Central & Eastern Europe / Global
- Members: Over 200 educational institutions / Individual Members in over 50 countries
- President: Prof. Danica Purg
- Website: www.ceeman.org

The Central and East European Management Development Association (CEEMAN) was established in 1993 with the aim of fostering management development and management education development in CEE region. Its membership includes over 200 members (business schools, universities, management development centers, national, regional and international associations, corporations and individuals) from more than 51 countries, including from Western Europe, both Americas, Africa and Asia.

== Activities ==
The main activities of the association include educational programs for faculty and staff of management development institutions (such as IMTA – International Management Teachers Academy and Program Management Seminar, International Quality Accreditation (IQA), international conferences, promoting case writing and use of case method in management education in CEE, fostering international cooperation and joint projects between its member institutions, etc.

== Collaboration ==
CEEMAN has collaboration with the EMBA council (Executive MBA Council), European Foundation for Management Development (EFMD), Association of MBAs (AMBA), Association to Advance Collegiate Schools of Business (AACSB International), and a number of other international and regional management development associations.

CEEMAN is a steering committee member of PRME – Principles for Responsible Management Education initiative and is leading its Working Group on Poverty as a Challenge to Management Education.

In 2009, CEEMAN, in cooperation with TMK Lab company from Slovenia and IEDC-Bled School of Management, established Challenge Future – a global youth think tank and competition on innovation and sustainability. The project offers various possibilities for engagement for youth in competitions and specialized contests on issues related to sustainability, discussion groups, action teams, or local university-based chapters, and by 2011 has attracted close to 18,000 members from 200 countries.

Since 1998, the association has been organizing an international Case Writing Competition. As of 2007, this has been in partnership with Emerald, an independent publisher of global research.

== Accreditation ==
Established in 1998, the International Quality Accreditation (IQA), focuses on addressing the needs of management schools. CEEMAN modified its IQA accreditation scheme in 2007 with new assessment procedures to encourage schools to focus on the delivery and development of quality educational products within their specific environment and context.
