= Graduate Management Admission Council =

Organization of business schools

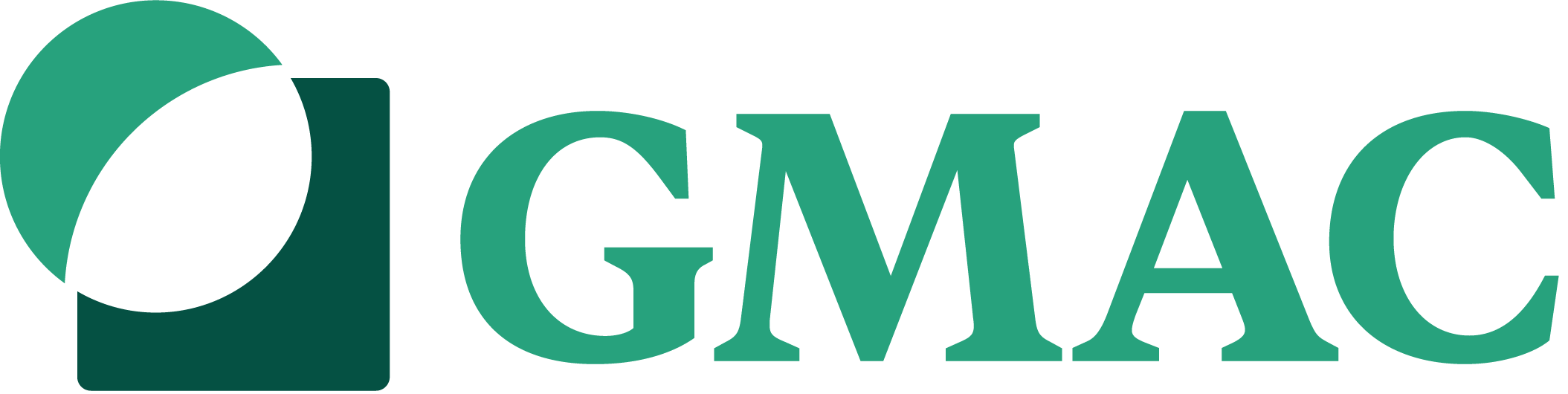
- Founded: 1953
- Type: 501(c)(3)
- Purpose: Higher Education, Testing
- Location: Reston, Virginia, U.S.
- Region served: Worldwide
- Key people: Joy Jones (Chief Executive Officer)
- Website: gmac.com

The Graduate Management Admission Council (GMAC) is an international non-profit organization of business schools that provides products and services to academic institutions and prospective graduate management education students. The organization owns the Graduate Management Admission Test (GMAT), a standardized assessment that is widely used by graduate business administration programs (e.g. MBA, Master of Accountancy, Master of Finance, Master of Science in Business/Management, etc.) to measure quantitative, verbal, analytical and integrated reasoning skills in applicants.

GMAC is based in Reston, Virginia. In 2007, the organization opened an office in London, its first international location. GMAC also has offices based in Shanghai, China and Gurgaon, India. The Graduate Management Admission Council has 227 member schools from 34 countries, including Australia, Canada, China, France, Great Britain, India and the United Kingdom. In 2007, the organization embarked on an effort to increase its membership outside North America. GMAC is governed by a 16-member board of directors that includes representation from business schools and private industry.

== Products and services ==
The GMAT exam, taken more than 230,000 times per year, is designed as an objective predictor of how well a student will perform academically in the first year of a graduate business education program. Through the Validity Study Service (VSS), the GMAT has been shown by GMAC researchers to be a reliable predictor of academic performance in business school, especially when used in combination with an applicant's undergraduate grade point average. In June 2012, a new section was added to the GMAT Exam called Integrated Reasoning.

GMAC's other products include the Graduate Management Admission Search Service (GMASS), a searchable database of more than 350,000 GMAT Exam and mba.com registrants. Admissions professionals can also use GMATCH, GMAC's two-day online global recruiting event.

In 2013, GMAC launched the Reflect Self-Assessment and Development Tool. It is an online assessment and self-directed, soft-skills development program.

== See also ==
- Master of Accountancy
- Master of Finance
- Master of Business Administration
- Standardized Test
