= Tuition fees in France =

Tuition fees existed in French universities prior to World War II, and have remained at approximately the same level as % of total funding. From 2007, universities in France have been granted a greater degree of independence, including the ability to increase fees in excess of the maximum established by the state for postgraduate studies. In November 2018, it was announced that with the beginning of the academic year 2019/20, non-European students would be charged higher tuition fees.

Private sector institutions are free to establish the fees they desire. In the public sector fees may differ between universities and higher education establishments (Grands établissements).

== Tuition fees in the public sector ==
=== Non-autonomous Universities ===
Fees for undergraduate studies are determined annually by the Education Ministry. In 2018 the following fees were set by the state for students that are nationals of the EU, EEA, or Switzerland, starting with the academic year 2019/20:

- Undergraduates 170 Euros per year
- Post-graduates 243 Euros per year
- Doctorates 380 Euros per year

These lower fees also apply to Canadian nationals who are legal residents of Quebec. Nationals from all other countries are charged tuition fees amounting to:

- Undergraduates 2,770 Euros per year
- Post-graduates 3,770 Euros per year
- Doctorates 3,770 Euros per year

However, non-European nationals are exempt from these higher tuition fees if they are already legal residents in France or the European Union before the start of their studies.

=== Autonomous universities ===
Since 2007 universities may opt for an autonomous status. Autonomous universities have the ability to determine certain tuition fees. While undergraduate fees are capped at the level set by the Ministry of Education, post-graduate and doctorate studies may be set freely by the universities. Paris-Dauphine university was one of the first universities to approve a significant increase in the tuition fees for its Masters in 2010 Fees were increased from the then national standard fees of 210 euros to 4000 euros (for family revenues above 80,000 euros).In 2013 90% of French universities had opted for the autonomy status.

=== Higher education establishments ===
Higher education establishments (also referred to as Grands établissements) differ from universities as admissions are based on entry exams. The fees charged by these state establishments are higher than in universities but remain low by international comparison. There are 60 such establishments. The fees range from 450 euros to 1100 euros per annum.

== Supplementary fees ==
Since 1993 Universities may also charge certain clearly identified supplementary fees linked to the particular type of studies. Such fees may include a contribution to the costs of specialist equipment.

== Social security ==
Although not part of tuition fees students are required to pay social security contributions of approximately 200 euros per year.
