= European Foundation for Management Development =

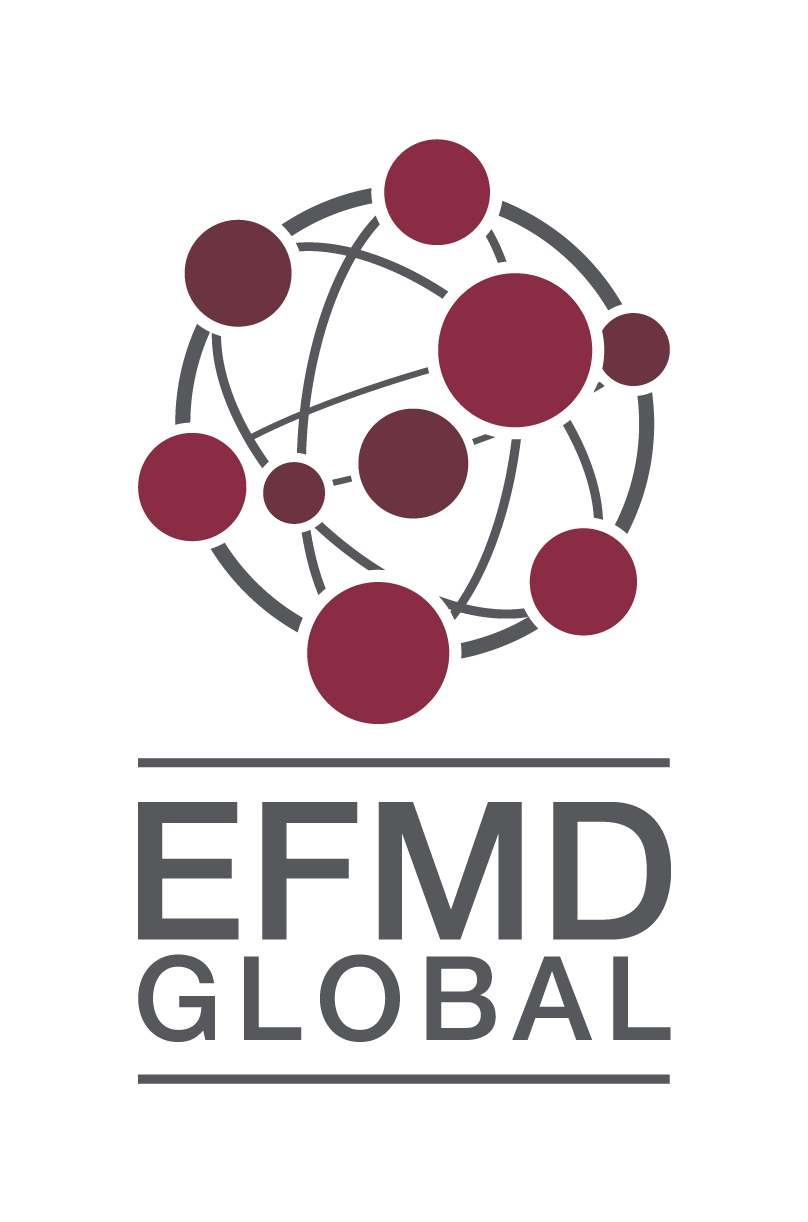
- Abbreviation: EFMD
- Formation: 1972
- Type: Not-for-profit organization
- Purpose: Educational accreditation
- Headquarters: Brussels, Belgium
- Region served: Global
- Members: Over 90 in 95 countries
- Chief Executive Officer: Eric Cornuel
- Website: efmdglobal.org

The European Foundation for Management Development (EFMD) is an international not-for-profit association based in Brussels, Belgium. It is Europe's largest network association in the field of management development with over 990 member organizations from academia, business, public service and consultancy in 95 countries (as of August 2025). EFMD provides a forum for networking in management development.

EFMD operates the EFMD Quality Improvement System (EQUIS), which is one of the major international systems of quality assessment, improvement, and accreditation of higher education institutions in management and business administration. It is comparable to its American equivalent Association to Advance Collegiate Schools of Business (AACSB) and provides a forum for information, research, networking and debate on innovation and best practice in management development.

The foundation also runs other accreditations and certifications for business schools, including the EFMD Programme Accreditation System (formerly EPAS) for individual programmes, the EFMD Deans Across Frontiers development programme (EDAF), and the Business School Impact System (BSIS). For corporate learning functions, it offers the Corporate Learning Improvement Process (CLIP) accreditation and the Learning Impact for Today and Tomorrow (LIFT) certification.

== History ==
EFMD was established in 1972 as the result of the merger of two earlier initiatives: the European Association of Management Training Centres (EAMTC), founded in 1959, and the International University Contact for Management Education (IUC), created in 1952. From the outset, its aim was to strengthen management education and development in Europe and beyond, and to build bridges between academia and business practice. The first meeting of deans and directors took place in 1973, and by then EFMD had already reached 193 members. In 1980, EFMD launched its first international project in China (CEMI), which led to the creation of the China Europe International Business School (CEIBS) in 1994.

The organization expanded in the following decades. It introduced the Case Writing Awards in 1989 and the EFMD Quality Improvement System (EQUIS) in 1997. The Corporate Learning Improvement Process (CLIP) followed in 2003. EPAS, launched in 2005, evolved into EFMD Accredited in 2020.

In the 2010s, EFMD created the EFMD Deans Across Frontiers (EDAF) programme (2011) and established the EFMD Global Network (2012), with offices in Hong Kong, Miami, Geneva, and Prague. New regional projects were developed in Latin America and Africa. The Business School Impact System (BSIS) was launched in 2014. Online Course Certification System (EOCCS) followed in 2016, while the Executive Academy was created in 2017. EFMD celebrated its 50th anniversary in 2022.

== Activities ==
EFMD’s activities connect academia, business, and policy to improve management education globally.

=== Membership ===
Membership began with around 193 European member institutions in 1973. By 2025, its membership had grown to approximately 990 organisations across 95 countries. Membership categories are tailored to academic institutions, corporations, and other organisations, and provide access to accreditation, events, research, and knowledge sharing.

=== Governance ===
EFMD is governed by a Board of Directors, elected from its membership, which defines the organization's general policy and strategy. It includes a Chair, Vice-Chairs, and members from academia and business sectors across the globe.

Day-to-day operations are led by the President of EFMD Global, Eric Cornuel, who has held the position since 2000.

=== Accreditations and certifications ===
EFMD provides accreditation and certification frameworks for both business schools and corporate learning organisations. Its main systems include EQUIS (institutional accreditation for business schools). The evaluation considers governance, faculty qualifications, research, degree portfolio, student services, internationalisation, ethics, and connections with the corporate world. Accreditation is normally granted for three or five years, depending on the strength of the school’s performance. EQUIS is one of the major global benchmarks for business school quality. EFMD Programme Accreditation, a programme-level accreditation, and BSIS (Business School Impact System), which assesses the societal and economic contributions of institutions. It also offers EDAF (EFMD Deans Across Frontiers), which provides developmental mentoring for schools, as well as CLIP (Corporate Learning Improvement Process) and LIFT (Learning Impact for Today and Tomorrow), which evaluate corporate learning functions.

=== Events ===
EFMD organises a range of global conferences and seminars, including annual, deans, and other thematic gatherings, to convene leaders in management education and corporate learning.

=== Professional development ===
Since 2002, EFMD has organised professional development programmes for academic leaders, administrators, and career service staff. These programmes are structured around leadership skills, institutional management, and knowledge exchange among participants.

=== International projects ===
EFMD’s International Projects Department manages externally funded projects, many supported by the European Union. Since its creation, it has coordinated over 70 projects in more than 60 countries. These initiatives focus on topics such as digitalisation of higher education, internationalisation strategies, inclusivity, gender equality, and entrepreneurship.

=== Publications ===
EFMD publishes Global Focus, a magazine covering trends, research, and commentary in management education and corporate learning. It also maintains the EFMD Blog, which reports on activities, case studies, and updates from the network. In addition, EFMD collaborates with knowledge producers such as CarringtonCrisp, GMAC, and other research organisations to produce reports on developments and trends in management education.
