= Mondrian (disambiguation) =

Piet Mondrian (1872–1944) was a Dutch painter and theoretician.

Mondrian may also refer to:

== Buildings ==
- Mondrian, a hotel brand of Ennismore and owned by Accor
  - Mondrian Doha
  - Mondrian Hong Kong
  - Mondrian Los Angeles, the former flagship, now The Valorian Los Angeles
  - Mondrian Mexico City Condesa, located in the architecturally significant Conjunto Aristos complex
  - The former Mondrian London, now Sea Containers House
  - The former Mondrian SoHo, now the NoMo SoHo
- The Mondrian, a high-rise building in Dallas, Texas, U.S.
- Mondrian, a building at the University of Auckland's Elam School of Fine Arts, New Zealand
- The Mondrian, a high-rise condominium building at 250 East 54th Street (Manhattan)

== Science and technology ==
- Mondrian (Google software), developed by Guido van Rossum
- Mondrian (software), a statistical data visualization system
- Mondrian OLAP server, a software component
- Mondrian, an object-oriented version of the programming language Haskell
- Mondrian, a visual test for color constancy

== Other uses ==
- The Mondrian collection of Yves Saint Laurent, a fashion collection
- The Mondrians, a Swiss band
