= Regent's University London =

Private university in London, England

- Former name: Regent's College
- Type: Private university
- Established: 1984
- Parent institution: Galileo Global Education
- Affiliations: Universities UK
- Budget: £42.4 million (2022/23)
- Chancellor: Pending appointment
- Vice-Chancellor: Geoff Smith
- Academic staff: 150
- Administrative staff: 189
- Students: 1,865 (2021/22)
- Undergraduates: 1,185 (2021/22)
- Postgraduates: 675 (2021/22)
- Location: Regent's Park, London, NW1 4NS, England; 51.526°N 0.155°W
- Campus: Urban
- Website: regents.ac.uk

Regent's University London (formerly Regent's College) is a private university in London, in the United Kingdom. It is part of the multi-national education group Galileo Global Education.

The university was established in 1984 as Regent's College. It received taught degree awarding powers in 2012 and became a university in 2013. It is one of six private universities in the UK. Its campus is in Regent's Park, in central London.

== History ==
In 1984 Rockford College, Illinois, (now Rockford University) acquired the former South Villa Estate campus of Bedford College in Regent's Park and named the new institution Regent's College. The site was originally leased by Bedford College in 1908, and a new set of buildings designed by the architect Basil Champneys was opened by Queen Mary in 1913. The buildings were modified and added to over the years, especially after bomb damage during the Second World War. Bedford College merged with Royal Holloway College (another college of the University of London) in 1985 and moved to Royal Holloway's campus at Egham in Surrey, vacating the premises in Regent's Park. Regent's College gradually expanded, and the European Business School London moved to the College campus in 1987.

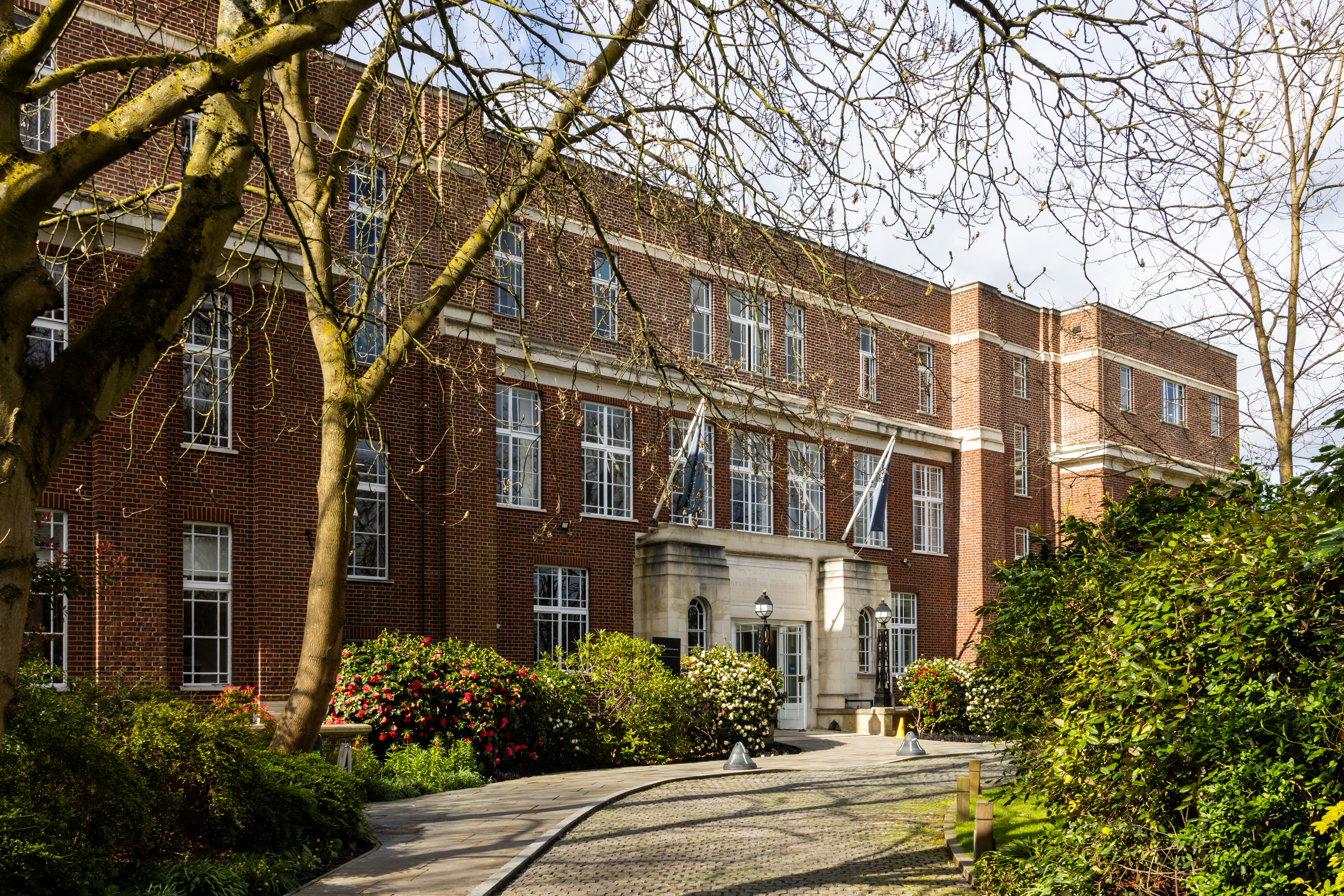
The campus.

It was granted degree-awarding powers for taught degrees with effect from 1 September 2012. In February 2013 it agreed to acquire American InterContinental University London from Career Education Corporation. In March 2013 it received approval from the Department for Business Innovation and Skills to become a university.

Validation of research degrees (MPhil and PhD) was transferred from the University of Wales to the University of Northampton for students starting from September 2016. This followed the decision of the University of Wales to withdraw from validating other institutions as part of its merger into the University of Wales Trinity Saint David.

The university's taught degree awarding powers were renewed for a further six-year term in 2018, after which they were made permanent in 2024.

In September 2020 the university was sold to Galileo Global Education, a multi-national education group.

== Administration ==
Regent's University London is a company limited by share capital and is a wholly owned subsidiary of Galileo Global Education Strategy (the parent company of the Galileo Global Education Group, incorporated in France). The immediate parent company within the group is Galileo Global Education Operations.

The board of directors is responsible for overseeing the strategy and goals of the University. The chair of the board is Nick Whitaker. Day-to-day operational management is delegated to the executive team, headed by the Vice-Chancellor and CEO.

Academic governance is carried out by the academic committee, which is responsible for the awarding of degrees and oversight of academic programmes.

=== Finances ===
In the financial year ended 30 June 2025, the university reported a total income of £68.6 million and total expenditure of £55.3 million. Tuition fee income accounted for £55.9 million of total income (81%). Staff costs were £23.6 million and other operating costs amounted to £28.9 million. The university recorded total net assets of £34.3 million and held £24.3 million in cash at bank and in hand.

== Academic profile ==
Regent's University London offers undergraduate, postgraduate and professional programmes across four schools: the school of arts and culture, Regent's Business School, the school of psychotherapy and psychology, and the school of law. In November 2025, the undergraduate tuition fees varied from approximately £23,000 to £27,750 per year.

=== Affiliations ===
Its business school is a member of several sector bodies. Some of these also carry out accreditation, but Regent's Business School does not hold these accreditations.

- Chartered Association of Business Schools (CABS)
- Association to Advance Collegiate Schools of Business (AACSB)
- Business Graduates Association (BGA)

The university’s school of psychotherapy, psychology and counselling is also affiliated with professional bodies. These organisations provide professional recognition and, in some cases, accreditation pathways, although Regent’s does not hold full professional accreditation from them.

- UK Council for Psychotherapy (UKCP)
- British Psychological Society (BPS)

=== Reputation and rankings ===
Regent’s University London holds a silver rating in the UK’s Teaching Excellence Framework. It became a certified B Corp in 2025.

== Student body ==
In the 2023–2024 academic year, 2405 students were enrolled, with 1355 undergraduate and 1050 postgraduate students.

The student body is international, with 660 students (27%) from the United Kingdom, 410 (17%) from the European Union, and 1,335 (56%) from the rest of the world.

Regent's University London Student Union is the students' union for the university. It provides a range of sporting activities, including football, basketball and volleyball, as well as fitness classes offered through the on campus Evolve Studio. A variety of student-led societies also operate across cultural, academic and recreational interests.

== Notable alumni ==
- Javed Afridi (CEO of Haier Pakistan)
- Kate Alexeeva (Latvian beauty queen)
- Sultan Sooud Al-Qassemi (Emirati commentator on Arab affairs and also a member of the Sharjah ruling family)
- Anjum Anand (food writer and television chef)
- Param Singh (Indian Actor)
- Michael Boulos (associate director of Callian Capital Group)
- Shikhar Pahariya (Indian industrialist, philanthropist, polo player)
- Mark Ehrenfried, (Pianist and composer)
- Kathrine Fredriksen (Norwegian businesswoman. Board member of Norwegian Property)
- Fabien Fryns (Belgian art dealer and collector)
- Riccardo Giraudi (CEO of Giraudi)
- Eleonore von Habsburg (Austrian fashion model, family member of the House of Habsburg-Lorraine)
- Sultan Muhammad V (former head of state of Malaysia)
- Marta Ortega Pérez (Chair of Inditex)
- Philip Ozouf (Treasury and Resources Minister in the Council of Ministers, Jersey)
- Sharan Pasricha (Founder & CEO of Ennismore, owner of Gleneagles Hotel and The Hoxton)
- Jetsun Pema Wangchuck (Queen consort of Bhutan)
- Karl-Johan Persson (President & CEO of Hennes & Mauritz)
- Sir Robert Paul Reid (former Chairman of the British Railways Board)
- Lady Kitty Spencer (English fashion model)
- Noelle Reno (fashion entrepreneur, television presenter and former model)
- Ruby Wax (comedian and television presenter)
- Elizabeth Yake (film-maker)
- Zeeshan Siddique (Indian politician)
