= Ennismore =

Ennismore may refer to:

- Ennismore (album)
- Ennismore, previous name of a part of Selwyn, Ontario
- Ennismore (company), company founded by Sharan Pasricha
