= Eva-Catharina Cramer =

German brewing industrialist

Catharina Cramer
- Born: Eva-Catharina Cramer; Warstein, West Germany (now Germany)
- Education: Königsmünster Abbey School
- Alma mater: European Business School London
- Occupation: Businesswoman
- Employer: Warsteiner
- Spouse: Frank Raddue (m. 2012)
- Children: 2

Eva-Catharina Cramer colloquially Catharina Cramer is a German businesswoman and brewery heiress, and the chief executive officer (CEO) of Warsteiner since 2012.

== Early life and education ==
Cramer was born in Warstein, West Germany (now Germany), the youngest of three daughters, to Albert Cramer (1943–2012) and Marianne Cramer. Her father was the 8th generation sole proprietor of the Warsteiner Brewery. She grew-up with two older sisters; Marie-Christina and Ann-Josephine. During her youth, she extensively engaged in equestrianism. She attended the Königsmünster Abbey School in Meschede and then pursued business studies at European Business School London.

== Career ==
Followed by several internships in investment banking, Cramer entered at JPMorgan Chase, in 2002. Further she was engaged at the market research institute Ipsos in Paris, France as well as at Pernod Ricard where she was the product manager for Ramazotti and Becherovka. In 2003, she decided to officially enter the family business, Warsteiner, in the 9th generation.

== Personal life ==
On June 10, 2012, Cramer married Frank Raddue (born 1970), a former mason and construction company owner, originally of Duisburg. They have two children born in 2013 and 2015.
