= Mark Ehrenfried =

German pianist and composer

- Born: Mark Christopher Paul Ehrenfried; 24 June 1991 (age 35); Berlin, Germany
- Education: Regent's University London
- Occupations: Pianist, composer
- Years active: 1999 - present
- Website: Official Website

Mark Christopher Paul Ehrenfried (German: [ˈeːʀənfʁiːt]; born 24 June 1991 in Berlin) is a German pianist and composer.

In 2024 he made the first solo-piano recording of Mozart’s Ganz kleine Nachtmusik in his own transcription.
