= La Fermette Marbeuf =

Gourmet restaurant in Paris, France

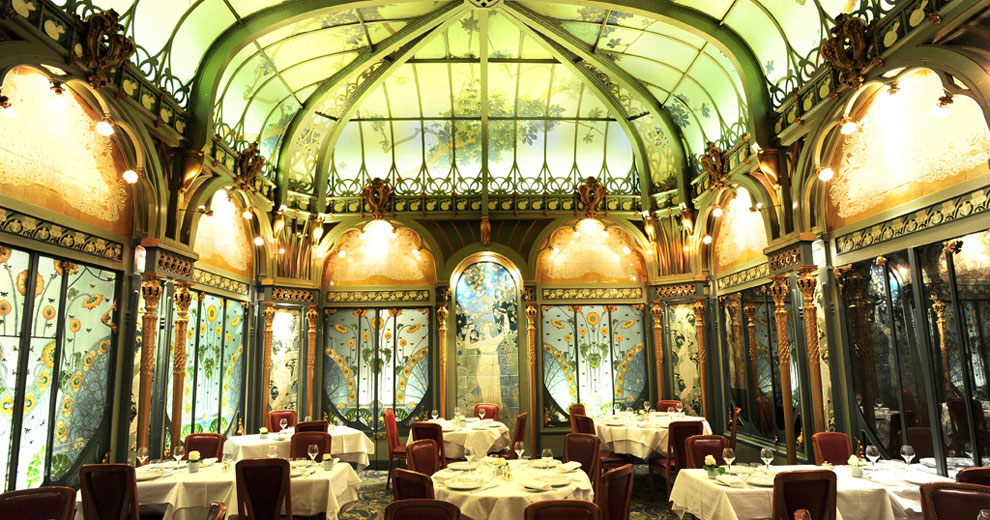
- The "1900 room" in the restaurant

- Location within Paris
- 48.8675472°N 2.302172°E
- Type: Restaurant
- Location: Rue Marbeuf and Rue du Boccador; 8th arrondissement of Paris; France

History
- Founded: 1898

Site notes
- Architect: Émile Hyrtre
- Restored: 1978
- Owner: Riccardo Giraudi

Monument historique
- Official name: Restaurant La Fermette Marbeuf
- Designated: December 9, 1983
- Reference no.: PA00088882

La Fermette Marbeuf was a prestigious gourmet restaurant in the Champs-Élysées quarter in the 8th arrondissement of Paris, France. Its Belle Époque Art Nouveau "1900 room" has been an official Historical Monument since 1983. It now hosts the restaurant Beefbar.

== History ==
The restaurant was founded in 1898 at the intersection of 3–5 rue Marbeuf and 27 rue du Boccador neighboring the Hôtel George-V, the Théâtre du Rond-Point, the Théâtre Marigny and the cabaret Crazy Horse between the Champs-Élysées Avenue and the Seine River. The restaurant was originally owned by the Langham Hotel of rue de Mogador.

In 2018, the restaurateur Riccardo Giraudi took over the establishment and opened his Beefbar restaurant. The "1900 room" was entirely refurbished by architects Emil Humbert and Christophe Poyet.

== Architecture ==
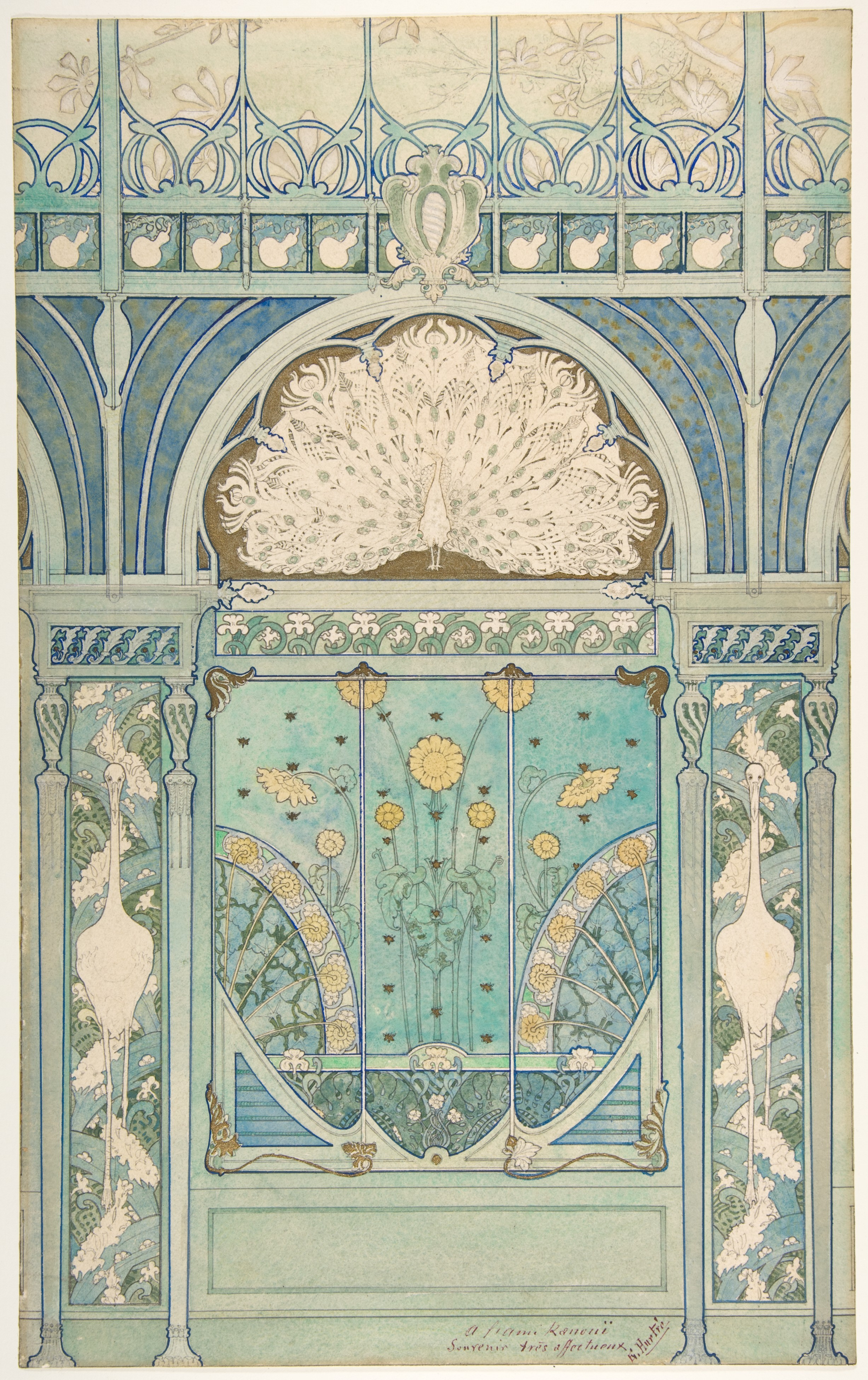
Wall panel by Émile Hurtré at the Metropolitan Museum of Art in New York City

The restaurant's winter garden-like Belle Époque Art Nouveau "1900 room" (salle 1900) was created by architect Émile Hurtré, craft painters Hubert and Martineau and ceramicist Jules Wielhorski. Its original setting was restored in 1978. It has a skylight roof, stained-glass windows, frescoes, ceramics, mosaics, wall paintings, chandeliers and furniture.

The "1900 room" was listed as an official Historical Monument on December 9, 1983.

== See also ==
Other 1900-style restaurants in Paris

- Le Train Bleu (Paris-Gare-de-Lyon, 12th arrondissement)
- Maxim's (3 rue Royale, Madeleine quarter, 8th arrondissement)
- Bouillon Chartier (7 rue du Faubourg-Montmartre, 9th arrondissement)
- Bouillon Racine (6 rue Racine, Odéon quarter, 6th arrondissement)
- Le Grand Café Capucines (Boulevard des Capucines, 9th arrondissement)
