= Francien =

Francien may refer to:

- Francien language
- Francien, feminine given name, Dutch version of the name Francine, borne by:
  - Francien de Zeeuw (1922–2015), Dutch resistance fighter during World War II
  - Francien van Tuinen (born 1971), Dutch jazz singer
  - Francien Huurman (born 1975), Dutch volleyball player
  - Francien Giraudi (born 1949), British philanthropist

== See also ==
- Francian (disambiguation)
