= Francien Giraudi =

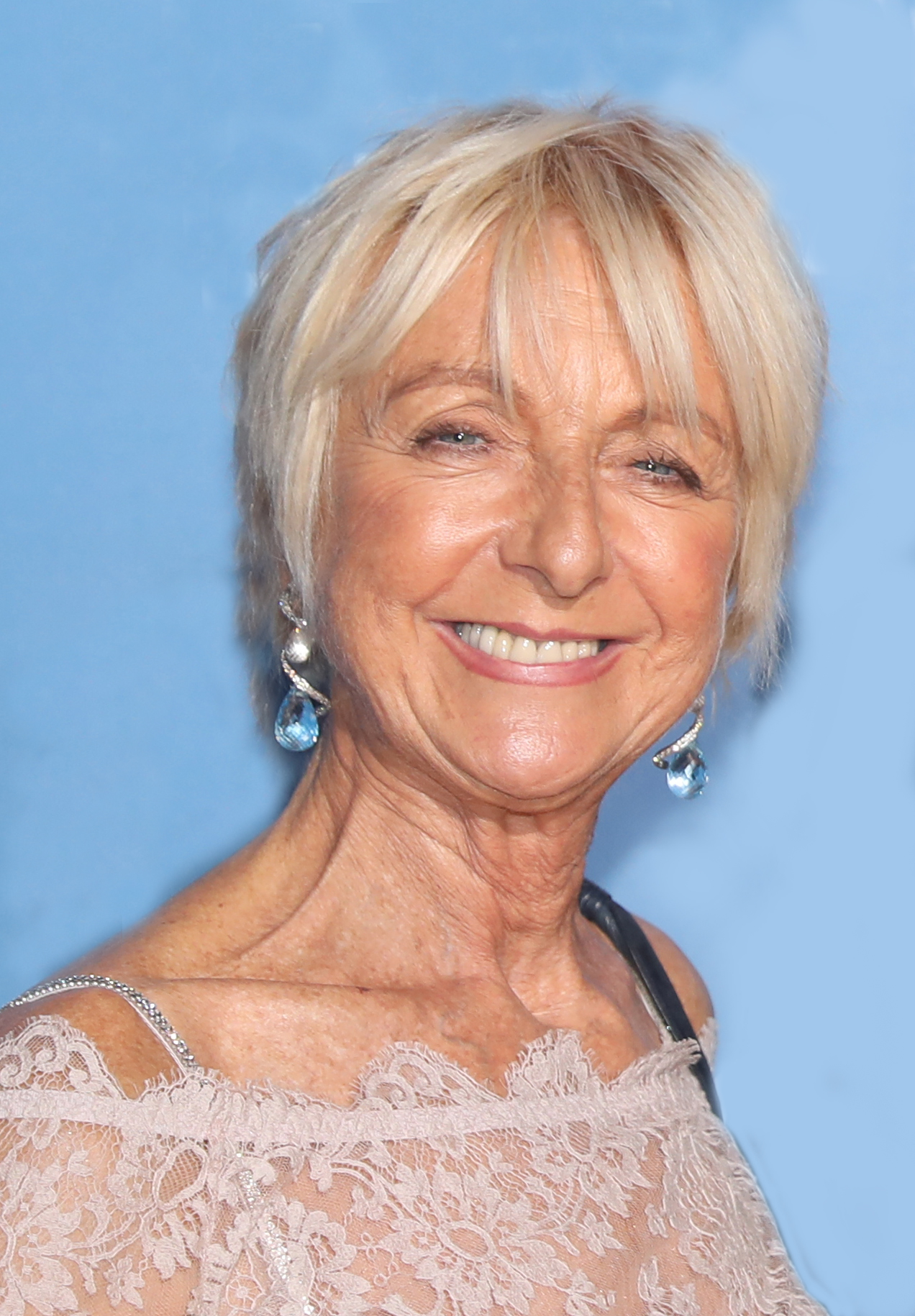
- Giraudi in 2014
- Born: 25 June 1949 (age 76); London, England
- Spouse: Erminio Giraudi (m. 1975)
- Children: 2

Francien Giraudi (born 25 June 1949 in London) is the founding president of a Monegasgue association which helps the sick children of Monaco and the region Provence-Alpes-Côte-d'Azur. Currently living in Monaco, she is a member of UNICEF. Active and committed to the Monegasque community, she received the title of Woman of the Year in 2014.In October 2018 she created "The Frankie Foundation for children" based in London who develops ways to improve lives of sick and disabled children of England and Wales and registered with the Charity Commission N°1180488.

== Family ==
From a family of restaurateurs on the side of her maternal grandparents, of an English housewife mother and of a Dutch father Fons Lobker, journalist and artist painter. After the separation of her parents at the age of 5, Francien lived with her grandmother in London and graduated from St. Mary's College in London in 1967. Then, worked at "Burberry" as a performer for 3 years. In 1973 during one of her travels in Italy, she met future husband Erminio Giraudi and married in 1975. Two children were born of their marriage, Riccardo and Brigitte. The couple arrived at the same time in Monaco to settle there and still lives there.

== Commitments ==
- 1980 : Vice president of "Les Voisins" Association
- 1997 : Member of UNICEF and founding president of the Monegasque Association "Les Enfants de Frankie"
