= Warsteiner =

German brewery

Coordinates: 51°25′18″N 8°21′16″E

Warsteiner Beer and Brewery
- Location: Warstein, Soest, Germany
- Opened: 1753
- Key people: Eva-Catharina Cramer (CEO)
- Annual production volume: 2.34 million hectolitres (1,990,000 US bbl) in 2015
- Owner: Catharina Cramer

Active beers
Name	Type
Warsteiner Premium Verum	Pilsener
Warsteiner Premium Dunkel	Dunkles Lager
Warsteiner Premium Fresh	Non-Alcoholic
Konig Ludwig Weiss- Royal Bavarian Hefeweizen	Hefeweizen

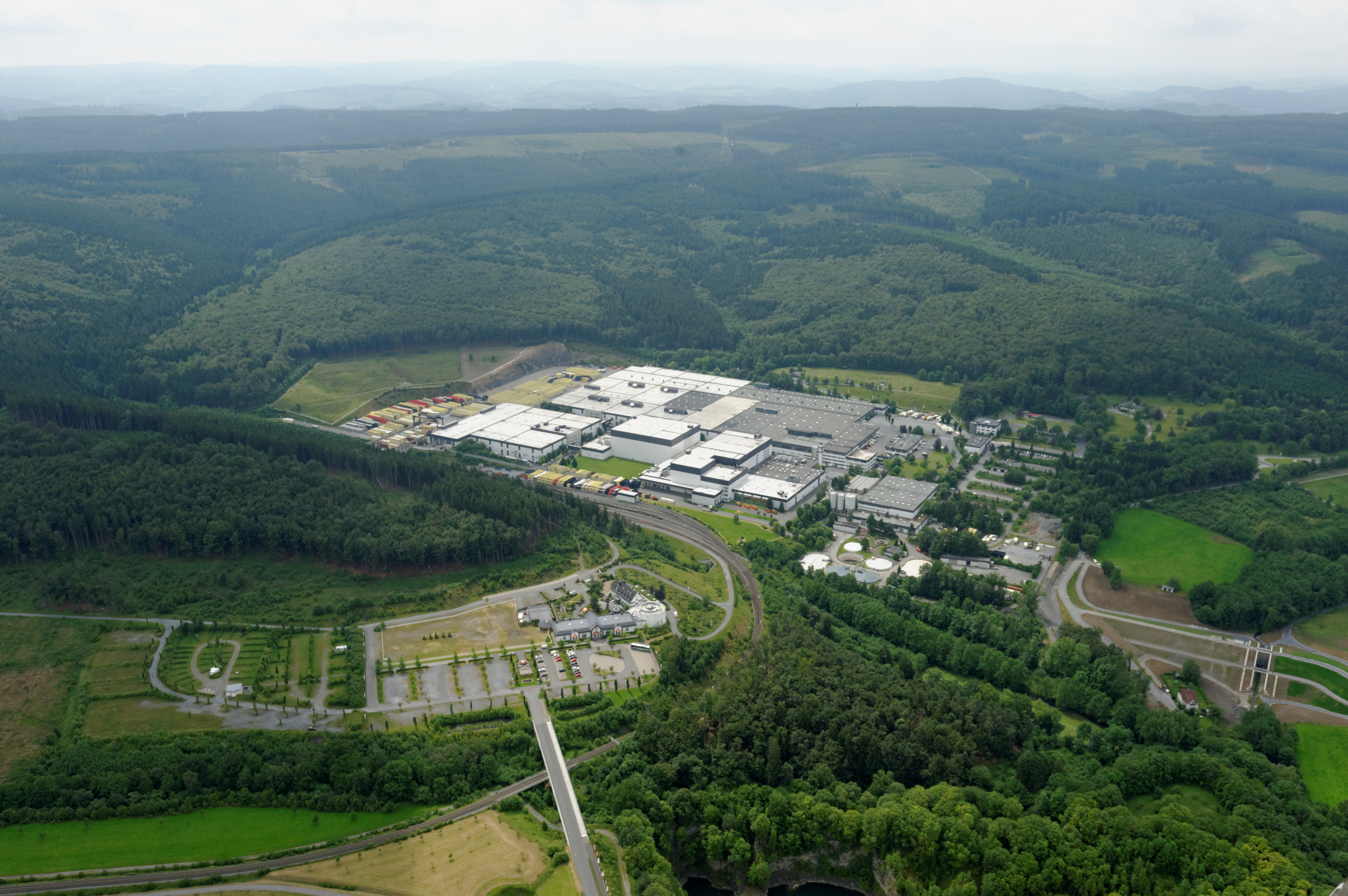
Warsteiner brewery

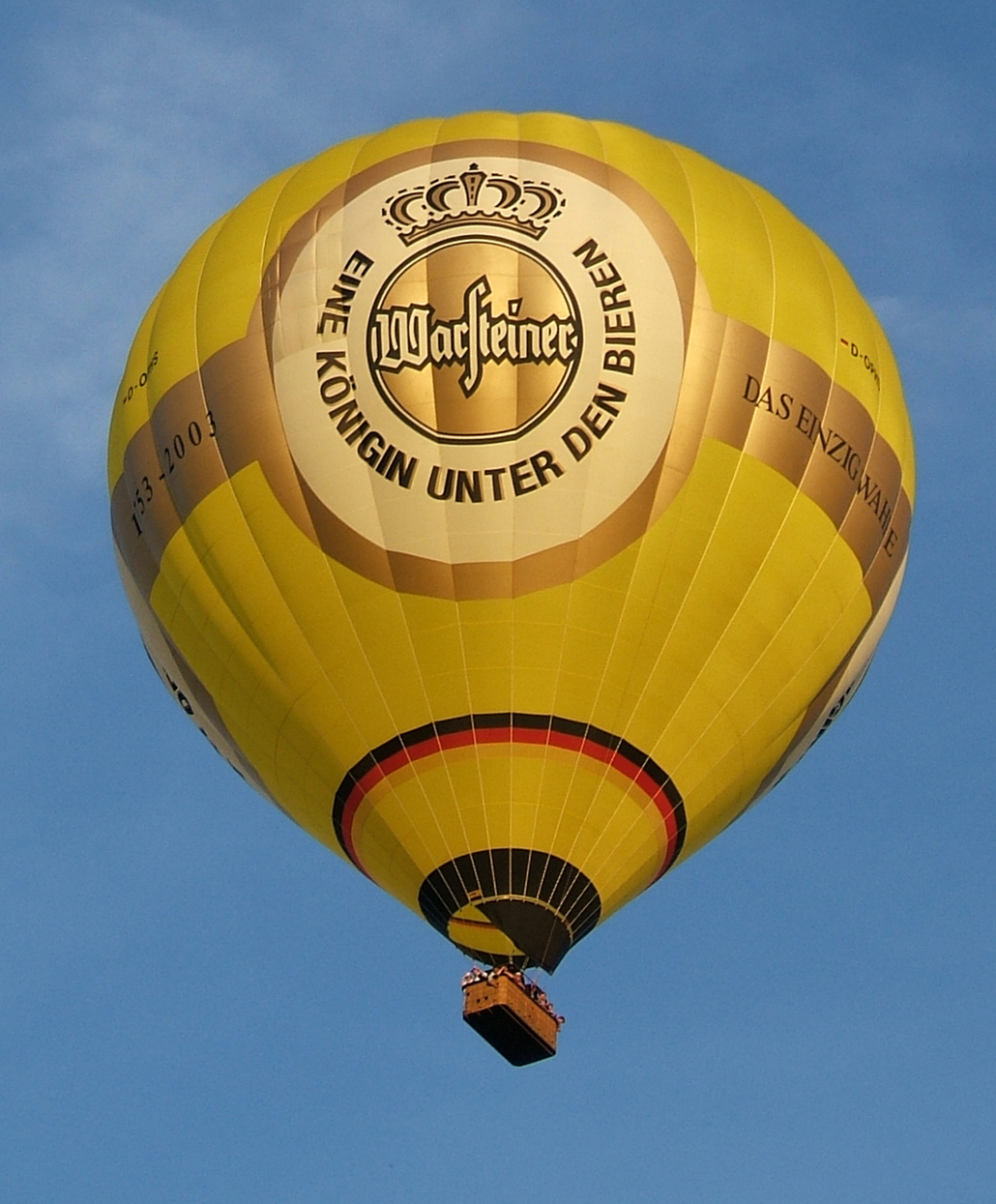
Warsteiner hot air balloon manufactured by Ultramagic

Warsteiner (German pronunciation: [ˈvaːɐ̯ʃtaɪnɐ, ˈvaʁ-]) is a German beer brand. The beer is brewed in the Arnsberg Forest Nature Park outside of Warstein, North Rhine-Westphalia, Germany. Warsteiner has been owned by the Cramer family since 1753. Warsteiner is Germany's largest privately owned brewery; its best selling beer is Warsteiner Premium Verum.

Warsteiner ranks fifth among Germany's best selling breweries.

== History ==
According to Inc. magazine, "In 1753, the farmer Antonius Cramer from the town of Warstein, Germany [laid] the foundation for a German beer dynasty."

The earliest mention of the brewing company is a tax record from 1753, when Antonius Cramer paid 1 thaler, 19 guilders on beer he brewed and sold himself.

His son Johannes Vitus followed in his footsteps and brought the selling of home-brewed beer into his house, in the heart of Warstein. His company benefited from its central location. However, in 1802 a devastating fire left Warstein in ruins and ashes; the business of the Cramers fell victim to the flames.

At the same time, they rebuilt their house as a guest accommodation and became through the establishment of the St. Pancras Church the centre of the town.

The headquarters of the Warsteiner Brewery, the Domschänke, still stands today in the historic core of Warstein.

Breweries in the Rhine valley were bombed during World War II, and the Warstein brewery sustained some damage.

== Beers ==
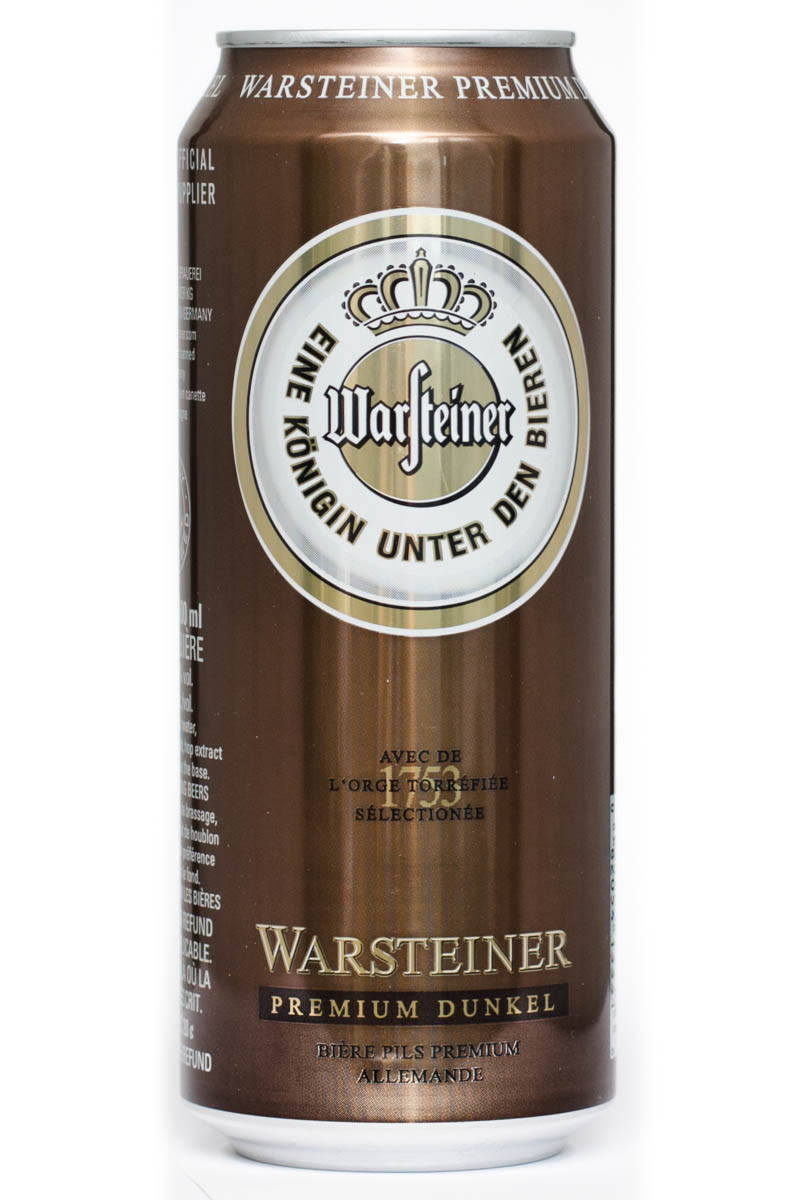
Warsteiner Premium Dunkel

All beers are brewed in strict accordance with the Bavarian Purity Law of 1516.

=== Warsteiner Premium Verum ===
Premium Verum, a pilsener style beer, is Warsteiner's flagship beer, and is exported to over 60 countries. The alcohol content is 4.8%.

=== Warsteiner Premium Dunkel ===
Premium Dunkel is Warsteiner's second most popular beer. Dunkel is a traditional style, dark beer with an alcohol content of 4.8%.

=== Warsteiner Premium Fresh ===
Warsteiner's only non-alcoholic beer, brewed exactly like the Premium Verum and then having the alcohol extracted. The beer contains 80 calories per 12 oz. bottle.

=== König Ludwig Weissbier – Royal Bavarian Hefeweizen ===
Royal Bavarian is a golden hefeweizen style beer. It is brewed with natural yeast and Bavarian ingredients, and has an alcohol content of 5.5%.

== Export and licensing ==
Warsteiner has been exporting its beers internationally since the 1980s. Furthermore, Warsteiner founded and acquired shares in other international breweries like Isenbeck brewery in Argentina and breweries in Africa.

All North American Warsteiner products are brewed, bottled, kegged and canned at the brewery in Warstein, Germany.

In some international markets, Warsteiner and Koenig Ludwig beers are license brewed by Mahou-San Miguel Group.

In the UK the beer is imported by James Clay & Sons.

== See also ==
- List of brewing companies in Germany
