= Waltz in A minor (Chopin, rediscovered 2024) =

Composition by Frédéric Chopin

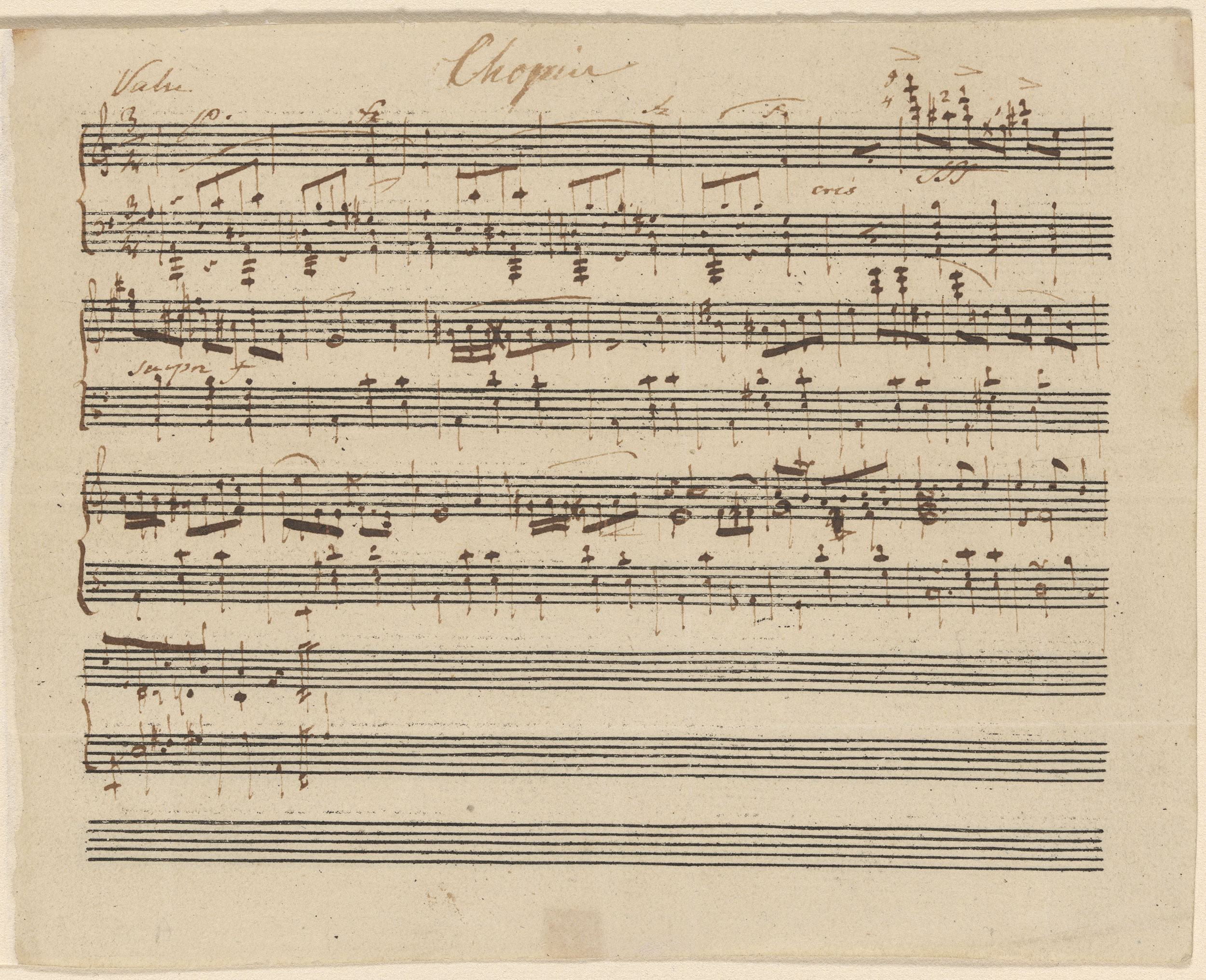
Autograph manuscript of the waltz

Recording by Luis Kolodin
Waltz in A minor

The Waltz in A minor (French: Valse en la mineur) is a waltz attributed to Frédéric Chopin found in the Morgan Library & Museum and announced to the public by The New York Times on 27 October 2024. Dated back to 1830–1835, authentication would make it the first discovery of an unknown work by Chopin since the late 1930s, though Artur Szklener, Director of the Fryderyk Chopin Institute, has doubts that the manuscript represents a complete work, and thus does not group it among Chopin's waltzes.

== Authentication ==
The manuscript, measuring 130 by 102 millimetres (5.1 in × 4.0 in), was discovered by museum staff in 2019, during the cataloguing of a bequest by Arthur Satz, who had purchased it from the wife of amateur pianist and former director of the New York School of Interior Design Augustus Sherrill Whiton Jr. Written in brown iron gall ink on machine-made wove paper that is somewhat yellower and thicker than that of later sheet music, both are consistent with those used by Chopin. More particularly, the paper may be contrasted with that of Chopin's Warsaw scores, with their "greenish tint", corresponding instead to that of his early years in Paris. The penmanship also matches that of Chopin, including its small size and the unusual bass clef, although his friend Julian Fontana drew this clef similarly, leading to some past confusion between their manuscripts. This extends to the "Valse" written at the top, although the name "Chopin" is in another hand.

Musicologist Jeffrey Kallberg assisted with the authentication on musical grounds, as opposed to the score having been merely copied out by Chopin. Artur Szklener, Director of the Fryderyk Chopin Institute, has noted "features of the brilliant style" consistent with Chopin's activity in the first half of the 1830s, and suggested that the manuscript's neatness argues against it having been co-written with a student during a lesson, while highlighting the absence of dedication and signature, as might be expected of a gift of a manuscript of this type. He regards the manuscript as more likely a "sketch of the first musical thought", "a trace of Chopin's activity in the pianistic community", than a complete work, and does not believe it ranks as his twentieth waltz, while accepting that the ornamentation of the melody and accompaniment's "shifting seconds" are hallmarks of Chopin.

== Description ==
The manuscript comprises twenty-four bars, to be played with a repeat. Atypically short, in performance the waltz lasts approximately one minute to eighty seconds. In the key of A minor and in 3/4 time, the score includes fingerings, while unusual dynamics include a fortississimo ("triple forte"; fff) near the beginning and before the theme emerges—described by pianist Lang Lang as evocative of winter in the Polish countryside.

== Discography ==
Deutsche Grammophon released a commercial recording of 'The Waltz in A minor "Found in New York"' as a digital single, performed by Lang Lang, on 8 November 2024. Warner Classics also released a commercial recording as a digital album with several of Chopin's mazurkas, performed by Piotr Anderszewski, on 5 November 2024.

== After Chopin ==
Pianist / composer Sam Post expanded this atypically short waltz into a seven minute piece composed in the approximate style of a Chopin scherzo with syncopated rhythms. This new piece, called “Waltz-Scherzo After Chopin" was commissioned by Bob Misbin for the Classical Arts Society of Washington and was premiered by Chris Schmitt at the Arts Club of Washington DC.

== See also ==
- Waltzes (Chopin)
- Ganz kleine Nachtmusik, a Mozart composition whose rediscovery was announced the month before (in September 2024)
