= Hart Avenue =

Street in Tsim Sha Tsui, Hong Kong

Coordinates: 22.2979°N 114.1745°E

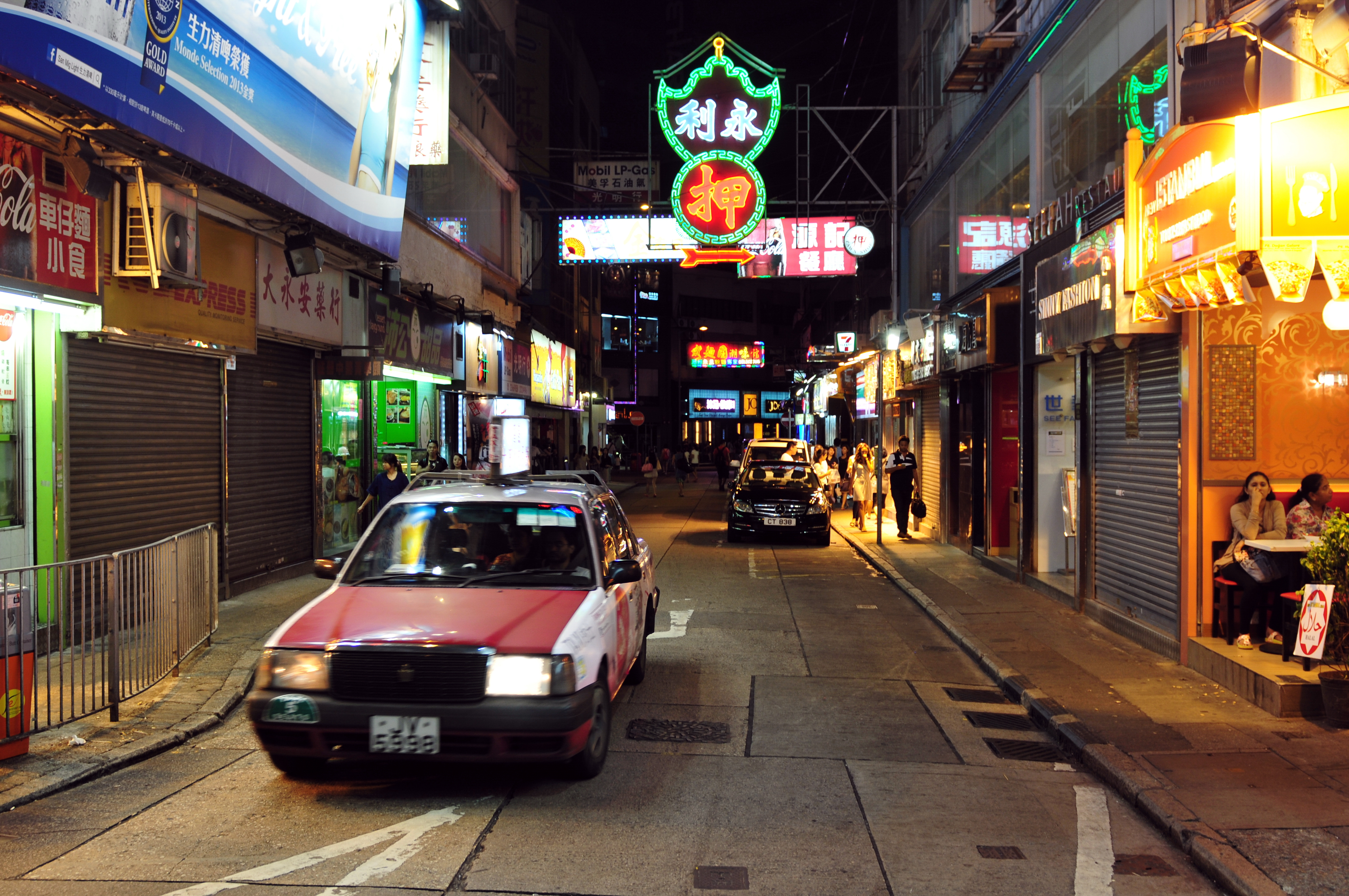
Hart Avenue in August 2013

Hart Avenue (Chinese: 赫德道) is a Y-shaped street in Tsim Sha Tsui, Kowloon, Hong Kong, located between Carnarvon Road and Chatham Road.

It was given the name Hart Avenue after Sir Robert Hart, 1st Baronet, a British consular official in China.

The northwestern end of the road starts at its junction with Carnarvon Road and Humphrey's Avenue. Prat Avenue branches from it immediately east of its start. It separates into two different streets halfway down, yet both are known by the same name-one branches east and ends at Chatham Road, the other turns down to Mody Road aligning Blenheim Avenue.

== See also ==
- List of streets and roads in Hong Kong
- Hotel Panorama
