= Eynsham Hall =

Country house in North Leigh, Oxfordshire, England

Coordinates: 51.808°N 1.428°W

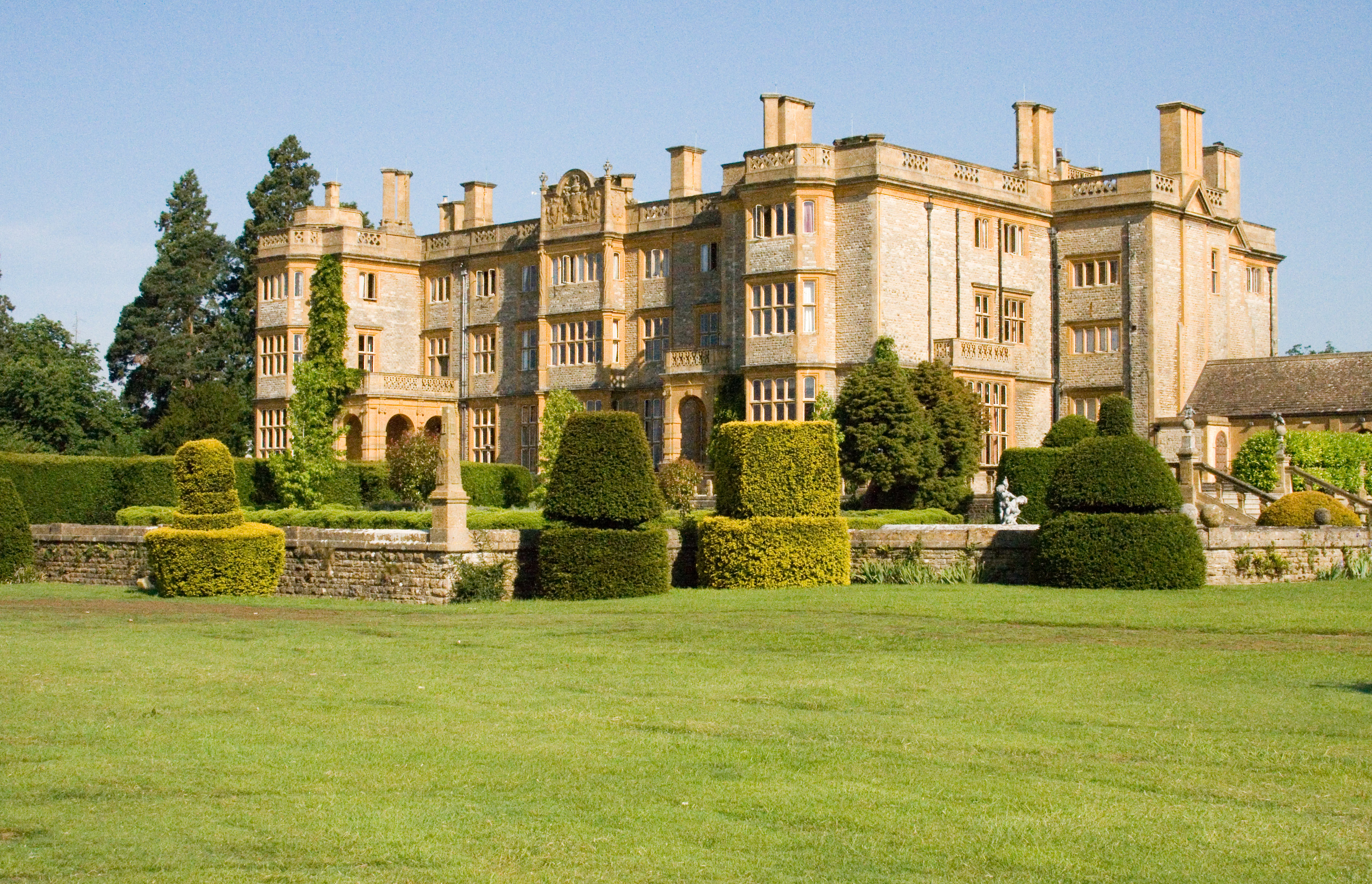

- Location within Oxfordshire
- Location: North Leigh, Oxfordshire, England

History
- Built: 1908

Site notes
- Architect: Ernest George
- Architectural style: Jacobethan
- Owner: Premiere Enterprises

Listed Building – Grade II
- Official name: Eynsham Hall and attached forecourt walls
- Designated: 3 September 1981
- Reference no.: 1368259

National Register of Historic Parks and Gardens
- Official name: Eynsham Hall
- Designated: 18 September 1994
- Reference no.: 1001288

Eynsham Hall (known commercially as Estelle Manor) is a Grade II listed mansion near North Leigh in Oxfordshire, England. The original house dating from the 1770s was largely rebuilt in the early 20th century by Ernest George.

After use as a country house and venue for hunting parties it became a maternity hospital rest and relaxation centre in World War II and then a police training centre. It is now used as a hotel and country club.

The three-storey limestone building is surrounded by extensive parkland and has terraced gardens. Many of the outbuildings, including the former game larder, are also listed buildings. North Leigh F.C. play in the grounds of the hall.

== History ==
In the grounds of Eynsham Hall are the earthworks of an Iron Age hill fort called Green Wood fort.

The original hall was built around the 1770s as a Georgian house, with extensive parkland. It was sold in 1778 to Robert Langford. By 1814 it was owned by Thomas Parker and leased for hunting parties. It was enlarged, with an additional upper floor, by Charles Barry in the mid-19th century and various outbuildings added. A fourth floor was added to designs by Owen Jones in the 1870s.

The Georgian house was demolished in 1904 and replaced with a Jacobethan mansion in 1906–8 to designs by Ernest George, for the Mason family, who had taken up residence in 1866. The house and estate included its own electric generating station, waterworks and gas plant, and a private telephone system linked the house to various outbuildings around the estate. Previous residents include Willoughby Lacey, Robert Langford, James Duberley, Sir Thomas Parker and Sir Thomas Bazley.

In World War II, part of Eynsham Hall was used as a maternity ward for expectant mothers evacuated from London. The Canadian artist Anthony J. Batten was born there in 1940. Referred to as the "flak shack", the Hall was also used for rest and relaxation (R&R) by the US Army Air Corps officers. The American Red Cross ran the R&R programme, and recreational activities included reading, bridge, snooker and table tennis.

The site was used as a police training centre by the Home Office from 1946.

In 2008 the Gun Room won a European Hotel Design Award. In 2018 Ennismore founder and co-CEO Sharan Pasricha bought Eynsham Hall and reopened the property in spring 2023 as Estelle Manor. West Oxfordshire District Council granted planning permission for another 80 guest rooms.

== Architecture ==
The three-storey limestone building is laid out in an "H" plan. At the centre of the front of the building is a porch with a door and tympanum with Ionic columns to the upper floors and a coat of arms. The garden front also has an armorial panel above the parapet. The interior includes oak panelling and stone fireplaces.

The north lodge with its attached walls, gates and gatepiers were built in 1845 by Charles Barry.

The former game larder and dairy were built by the architect Charles Henry Howell in 1883.

The house is surrounded by 330 hectares (820 acres) of parkland laid out in the 18th century, and pleasure grounds which were added in the 19th and 20th centuries. Some of the exotic species were planted by Robert Marnock in the 1860s. The lake was added in 1866 and provided a water supply to the house.
