= Deadstock Coffee =

American coffee company based in Portland, Oregon

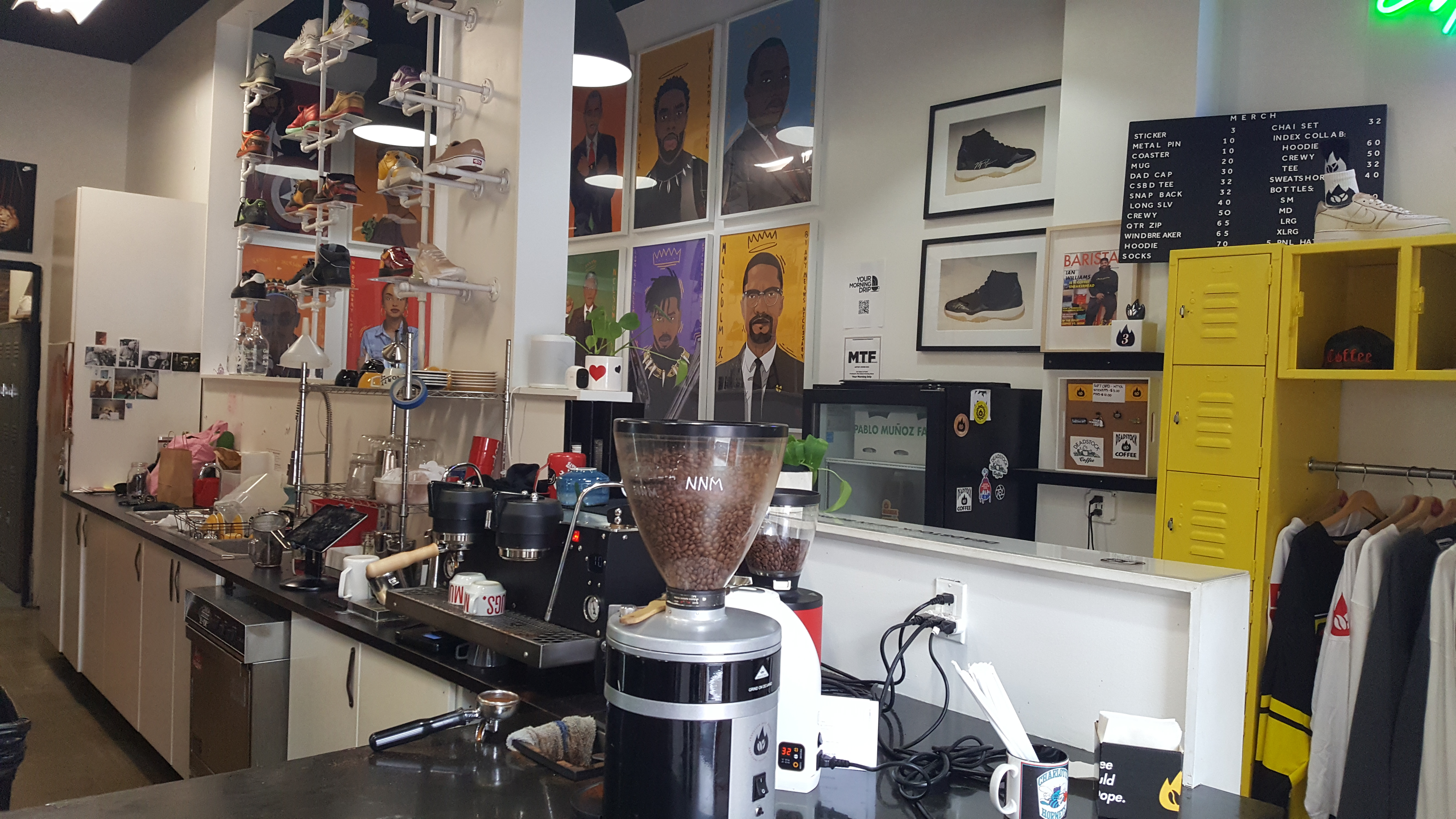
- Interior, 2022
- Interactive map of Deadstock Coffee

Restaurant information
- Owner: Ian Williams
- Location: 408 Northwest Couch Street, Portland, Oregon, 97209, United States
- Coordinates: 45°31′25.4″N 122°40′29.2″W
- Website: deadstockcoffee.com

Deadstock Coffee is a Black-owned coffee company based in Portland, Oregon, United States. The business has operated coffee shops in the Old Town Chinatown neighborhood and in Beaverton. Deadstock also and sells beans online.

In December 2025, the business announced plans to close the Old Town shop permanently. Deadstock is slated to begin operating from The Hoxton, Portland in 2026.

== Description ==
Deadstock bills itself as "snob-free" and uses the slogan "Coffee should be dope". Drinks include the Steph Curry (white chocolate mocha), the Lebronald Palmer (mixture of coffee, sweet tea, and lemonade), and the Luther Vandross (lavender mocha). Drinks can be topped with stenciled sneakers (Adidas, Jordans, Nikes, or Reebok). The chai lattes are made with One Stripe Chai.

== History ==
The business began as a cart and has operated a sneaker-themed coffee shop in the Old Town Chinatown neighborhood since August 2015. In 2020, the business saw a spike in business, and owner Ian Williams confirmed plans to open a location at Alberta Alley, a new development in northeast Portland.

In 2023, Deadstock Coffee and the Haitian restaurant Kann collaborated to launch a custom coffee blend. A second Deadstock location opened in Beaverton in 2024. In December 2025, the business announced plans to close the Old Town location permanently, on December 31. Deadstock had nine employees at the time. The business is slated to begin operating from The Hoxton, Portland's lobby cafe in 2026.

== Reception ==
In 2020, Williams was included in Portland Business Journal's top 40 under 40 list. Nick Townsend included Deadstock in Eater Portland's 2021 list of "11 Places to Find Charming Chai Lattes in Portland".

== See also ==
- List of Black-owned restaurants
