= Artur Szklener =

Polish musicologist (born 1972)

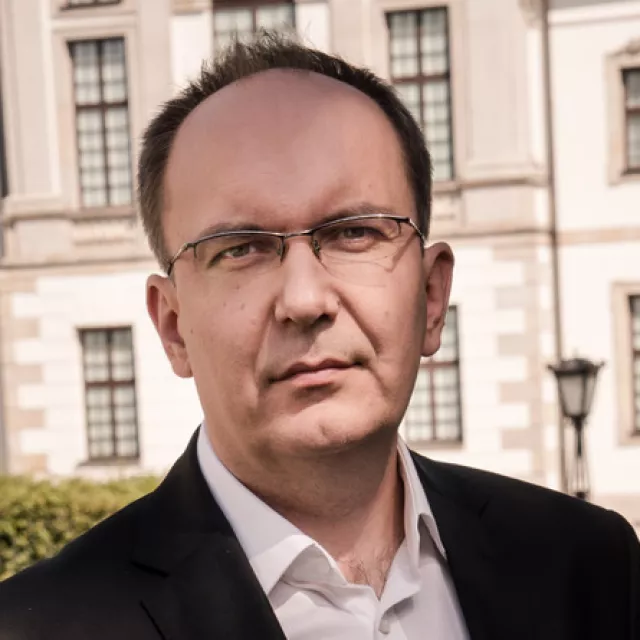
- Born: July 18, 1972 (age 54); Kraków, Poland
- Known for: Scholarship on Frédéric Chopin

Academic background
- Education: Jagiellonian University (BA, PhD)
- Thesis: "Chopin's melodic idiom"

Academic work
- Discipline: 19th-century classical music
- Institutions: Fryderyk Chopin Institute (since 2012)

Artur Szklener (born July 18, 1972) is a Polish musicologist, teacher, and cultural manager who specializes in 19th-century classical music, particularly that of Frédéric Chopin. He was appointed director of the Fryderyk Chopin Institute in 2012.

== Life and career ==
Szklener was born in Kraków in 1972. He studied musicology at the Jagiellonian University, graduating with honors in 1997. As a student, he earned scholarships to study at the University of Exeter (1994–1995) and in London, Prague, Brno and Kraków from 1994 to 1997 by means of the Phare program. Szklener obtained a PhD in humanities in the field of art at his alma mater in 2008 based on the dissertation Chopin's Melodic Idiom.

He began working at the Institute of Musicology at the Jagiellonian University after his doctoral studies. Szklener focused his scientific research on the works of Chopin and methods of analyzing tonal music.

In 2001, Szklener was employed at the Fryderyk Chopin Institute in Warsaw, initially as an expert in musicology, and then as a coordinator of the academic research program. In the years 2009–2012 he was deputy director for science and publishing. On May 1, 2012, he was appointed director of the institute. He has edited a series of academic publications comprising the proceedings of annual Chopin conferences and was involved in publishing the facsimile editions of Chopin's works, including the Waltz in A minor (Chopin, rediscovered 2024).

Szklener was director of the 17th and 18th editions of the International Chopin Piano Competition in 2015 and 2021. Between 2017-2019, Szklener was coordinator of the All-Poland Conference on Culture organized by the institute on behalf of Poland's Ministry of Culture and National Heritage.

He was awarded the Forbes Medal and the Cyprian Norwid Prize, as well as the Knight's Cross Order of Polonia Restituta in 2021.

== Selected bibliography ==
- Szklener, Artur (2003). Analytical perspectives on the music of Chopin. Warsaw: Fryderyk Chopin Institute. ISBN 8391741028.
- Szklener, Artur (2006). Chopin in Paris: The 1830s. Warsaw: Fryderyk Chopin Institute. ISBN 9788391741092.
- Szklener, Artur (2005). Chopin in Performance: History, Theory, Practice. Warsaw: Fryderyk Chopin Institute. ISBN 9788391741061.
- Szklener, Artur (2003). Chopin's Work: His Inspirations and Creative Process in the Light of the Sources. Warsaw: Fryderyk Chopin Institute. ISBN 9788391741016.
