= Geoff Smith (music composer) =

Classical/New Music composer

Vice Chancellor and CEO of Regent's University London
- Incumbent
- Assumed office August 12, 2019

Personal details
- Born: 1966 (age 59–60) Newcastle, United Kingdom
- Spouse: Nicola Walker Smith
- Children: 2
- Education: University of Nottingham (BA) University of Oxford (MPhil) University of Huddersfield (PhD) University College London (MBA)
- Profession: Academic, composer, musician

Geoff Smith (born 1966) is an English composer, academic and university Vice Chancellor. He has written and recorded four studio albums, performed internationally and been compared to such composers as Philip Glass and Steve Reich. In August 2019, he became the Vice Chancellor and CEO of Regent's University London, having formerly served as the Senior Deputy Vice Chancellor of Falmouth University and Head of Music & Performing Arts at Bath Spa University.

== Education ==
Smith earned his BA in music from the University of Nottingham before an MPhil in Electronic Music from the University of Oxford and a PhD in composition from the University of Huddersfield (where he was supervised by the composer Gavin Bryars). He also holds an MBA in Higher Education Management from the Institute of Education at University College London.

== Career ==
Along with his wife, singer Nicola Walker Smith (born 1964), he has written and recorded numerous pieces of music and published American Originals (Faber & Faber, 1995); a book of interviews with American contemporary composers such as John Cage, Philip Glass, Laurie Anderson and Terry Riley. Although strongly influenced by American composers, much of Smith's musical work borrows lyric content from traditional English verse and Romantic poets such as Emily Brontë, John Keats, Christina Rossetti, Percy Bysshe Shelley, and Elizabeth Siddal.

Following the release of his first album Gas Food Lodging (1993) with independent label Kitchenware Records, Smith signed a record deal with Sony Classical and a publishing contract with EMI. His second album, 15 Wild Decembers (1995), was produced by Steve Nye in New York, whilst his third album Black Flowers (1997) was produced at AIR Studios in London. In 2014, after fourteen years of inactivity, Smith recorded a new album Black is the Colour (2014) and released it digitally via Bandcamp.

His academic career began as a lecturer at the universities of Manchester and Huddersfield before joining Bath Spa University as Head of Music in 1998. In 2002, he founded the School of Music and Performing Arts at Bath Spa which was recognized as a national Centre of Excellence in Teaching and Learning in 2005. Later that year, aged 38, Smith was awarded a professorial title for ‘outstanding qualities of academic leadership’.

In November 2008, he joined Falmouth University as Senior Deputy Vice Chancellor where he expanded the university's academic portfolio and developed a range of national and international partnerships. He also led the development of the university's online brand, 'Falmouth Flexible', and authored the '2030 Portfolio Strategy' for the building of a pedagogy fit for the '4th Industrial Revolution'. In August 2019, he was appointed Vice Chancellor and CEO of Regent's University London and in April 2020 announced that he would donate 20% of his monthly salary back to the university in response to the financial pressures of the COVID-19 pandemic. He is also a Trustee of Trinity College London.

== Discography ==
=== Albums ===
- Gas Food Lodging (Kitchenware, 1993)
- 15 Wild Decembers (Sony Classical, 1995)
- Black Flowers (Sony Classical, 1997)
- Black is the Colour (Bandcamp, 2014)

=== EPs ===
- Six Wings (Sony Classical, 1995)

=== Other Recordings ===
- The Garden [Nicola Walker Smith] (Kitchenware, 1991)
