= Ennismore (company) =

British lifestyle hospitality company

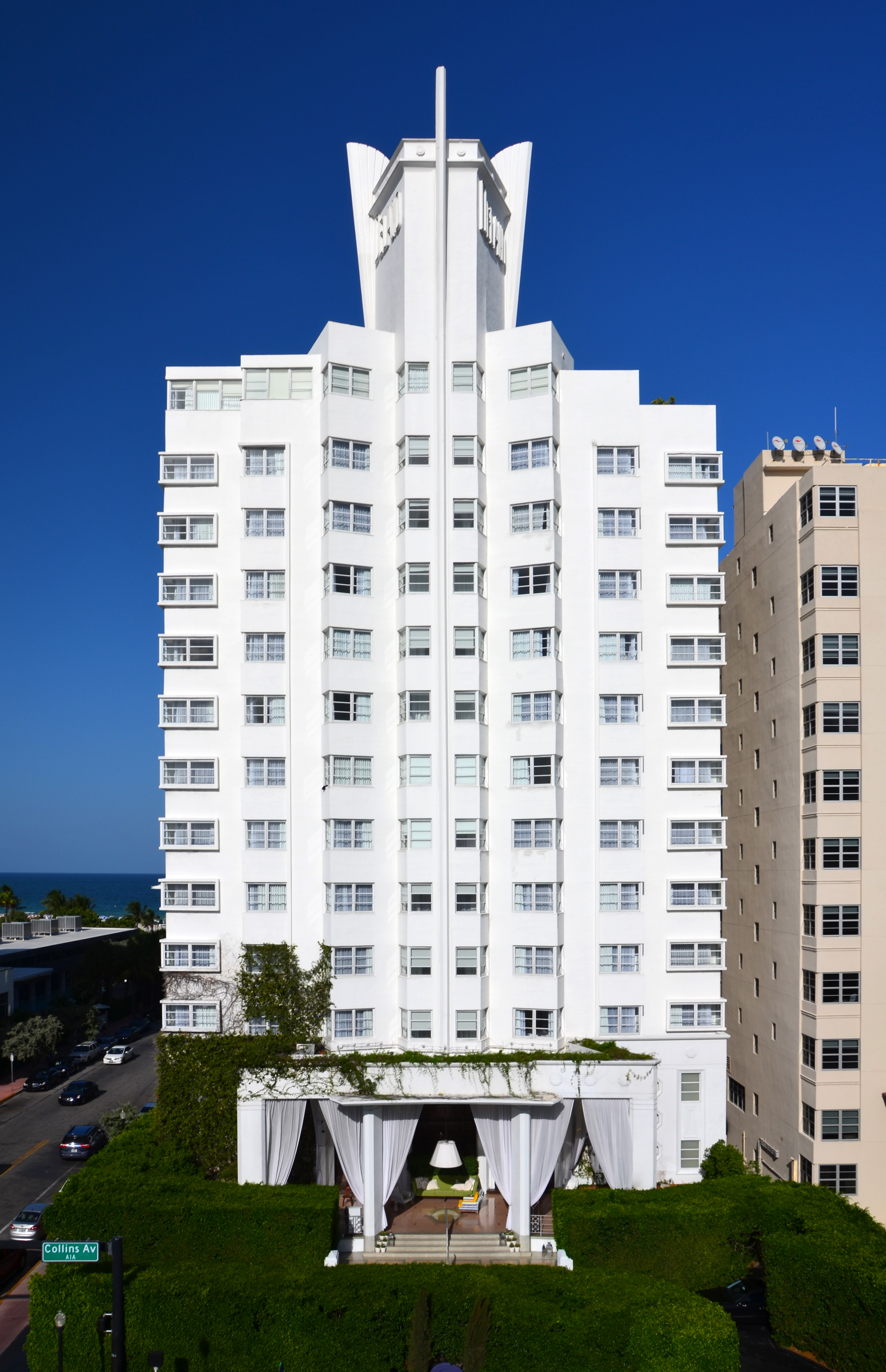
- The Delano, Miami Beach
- Type: Private
- Industry: Hospitality
- Founded: 2011; 15 years ago
- Founder: Sharan Pasricha
- Headquarters: London, United Kingdom
- Number of locations: 192 hotels (2025)
- Area served: Worldwide
- Key people: Sharan Pasricha and Gaurav Bhushan (co-CEOs from 2021)
- Brands: The Hoxton, Gleneagles, Mondrian, SLS, Delano, Hyde, Mama Shelter, 25hours, 21c Museum Hotels, SO/, Morgans Originals, Our Habitas, Rixos, Working From
- Owner: Accor (majority); Sharan Pasricha; Qatari investors
- Parent: Accor
- Website: ennismore.com

Ennismore is a London-based hospitality company that develops and runs lifestyle hotel brands, among them The Hoxton, Mondrian, Mama Shelter, SLS and Delano. Sharan Pasricha founded it in 2011, and Accor has been its majority owner since 2021. In 2025 it had 16 brands, 192 hotels and more than 500 restaurants and bars. It is "asset light", i.e. it mostly runs hotels that belong to other owners.

== History ==
=== Founding and early years ===
Ennismore started out as Ennismore Capital, a small London investment firm. In May 2012 it bought The Hoxton, a 208-bed hotel in Shoreditch opened in 2006 by Pret a Manger co-founder Sinclair Beecham, and set out to turn it into a chain. In 2015 it bought the Gleneagles Hotel in Scotland from Diageo; at the time it ran two Hoxton hotels in London. Its coworking brand, Working From, came out of people working in the Hoxton lobbies.

=== Merger with Accor ===
In November 2020 Accor took full ownership of the hotel brands of sbe, including Delano, Mondrian, SLS and Hyde, for its new lifestyle division, and the same month began talks to merge its lifestyle brands with Ennismore. The merger closed in October 2021. The new company kept the Ennismore name and its London base; Accor owned two-thirds and Pasricha one-third, and Pasricha and Gaurav Bhushan, head of Accor's lifestyle division, became co-CEOs. At the start it had 87 hotels, with 141 more in the pipeline.

=== Since 2022 ===
In June 2022 Accor agreed to sell 10.8 percent of Ennismore for €185 million to a group of Qatari investors led by Qatar First Bank. That put the company's value at more than €2 billion. Accor was to keep 62.2 percent. By 2023 the group also included Rixos, a brand of all-inclusive resorts, and Paris Society, a French restaurant and events group. In 2024 Ennismore had an EBITDA of €170 million. In October 2025 Accor said it was looking at a stock market listing of Ennismore, but would keep control of it.

== Brands ==
As of 2023 the brands were:

- From Ennismore: The Hoxton, Gleneagles (the hotel in Perthshire and, from 2022, a townhouse hotel in Edinburgh) and Working From
- From sbe, via Accor: Delano, Hyde, Mondrian and SLS
- From Accor: 21c Museum Hotels, 25hours, JO&JOE, Mama Shelter, Morgans Originals, SO/ and Tribe
- Added later: Rixos and Paris Society

Since then Accor has moved JO&JOE to its economy brands and Tribe to its midscale brands, and Our Habitas has joined Ennismore.

=== Luxury hotels ===
As of October 2026, the luxury brands had these hotels:

- Delano: Miami Beach (reopened), Dubai and Paris (Maison Delano), with London announced
- Gleneagles: the Gleneagles Hotel in Perthshire and Gleneagles Townhouse in Edinburgh
- Mondrian: Bordeaux, Cannes, Ibiza, Cancún (all-inclusive), Mexico City, Miami (South Beach), Gold Coast, Hong Kong, Seoul (Itaewon), Singapore and Doha, with the Maldives and Abu Dhabi announced
- Morgans Originals: Sanderson and St Martins Lane in London, Luura Paros Cliff on Paros and Roswyn in Mumbai
- SLS: Baha Mar (Nassau), Barcelona, Cancún, Playa Mujeres (Cancún), Puerto Madero (Buenos Aires), Dubai, the Red Sea (Saudi Arabia), Beverly Hills and Brickell (Miami), with Punta del Este announced
- SO/: Auckland, Bangkok, Hua Hin, the Maldives, Paris, Sotogrande, Saint Petersburg, Vienna, Dubai and Ras Al Khaimah, with Mexico City and Budapest announced

== Gallery ==
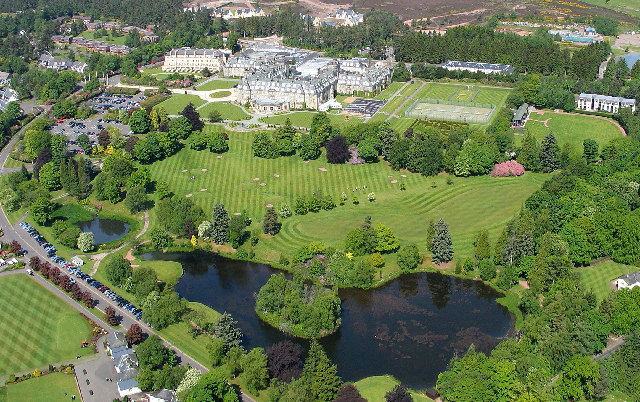
Gleneagles, Perthshire

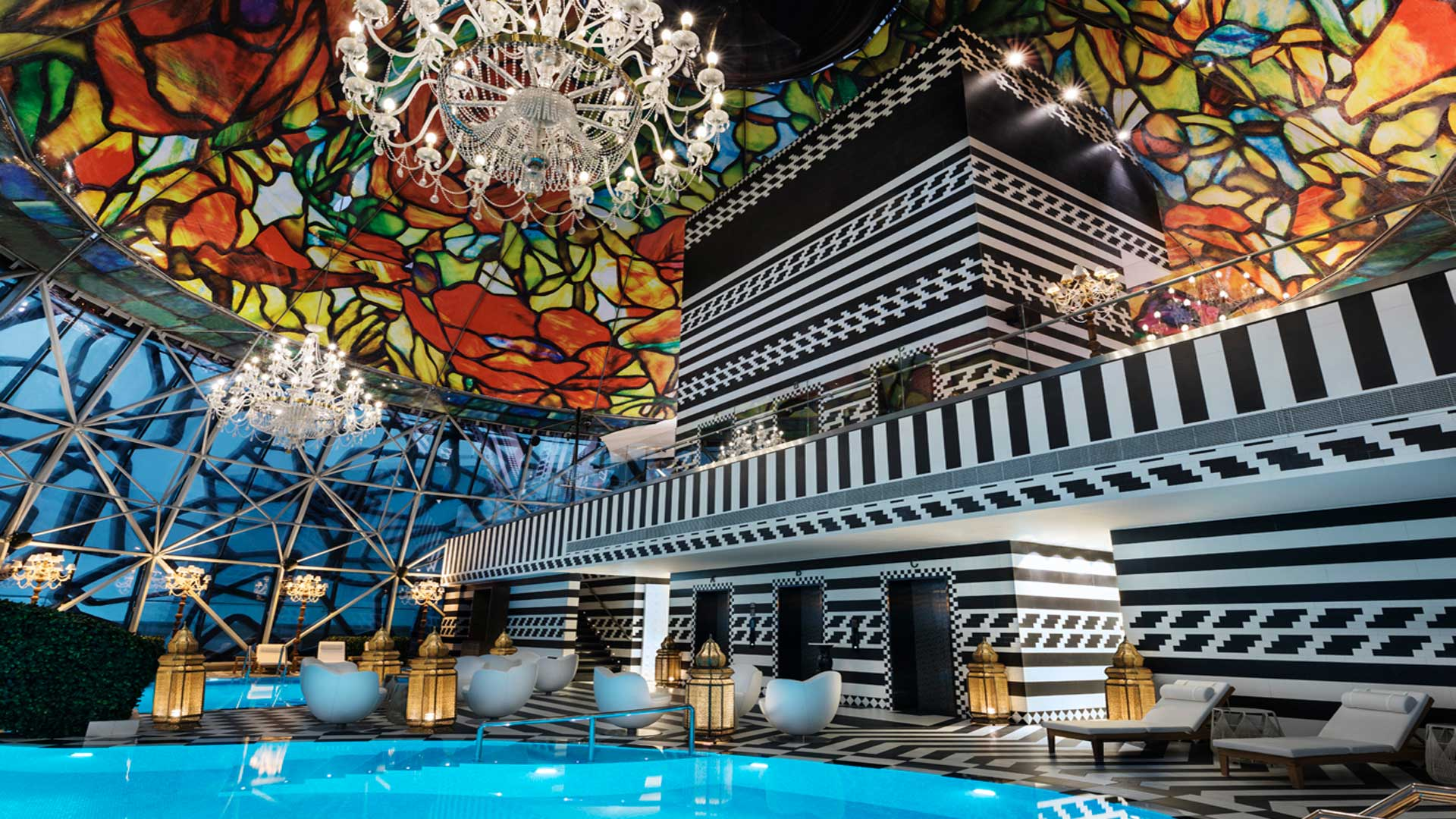
Rise Bar, Mondrian Doha

Mondrian and Andaz, Conjunto Aristos, Mexico City

Sanderson, London

SLS Barcelona

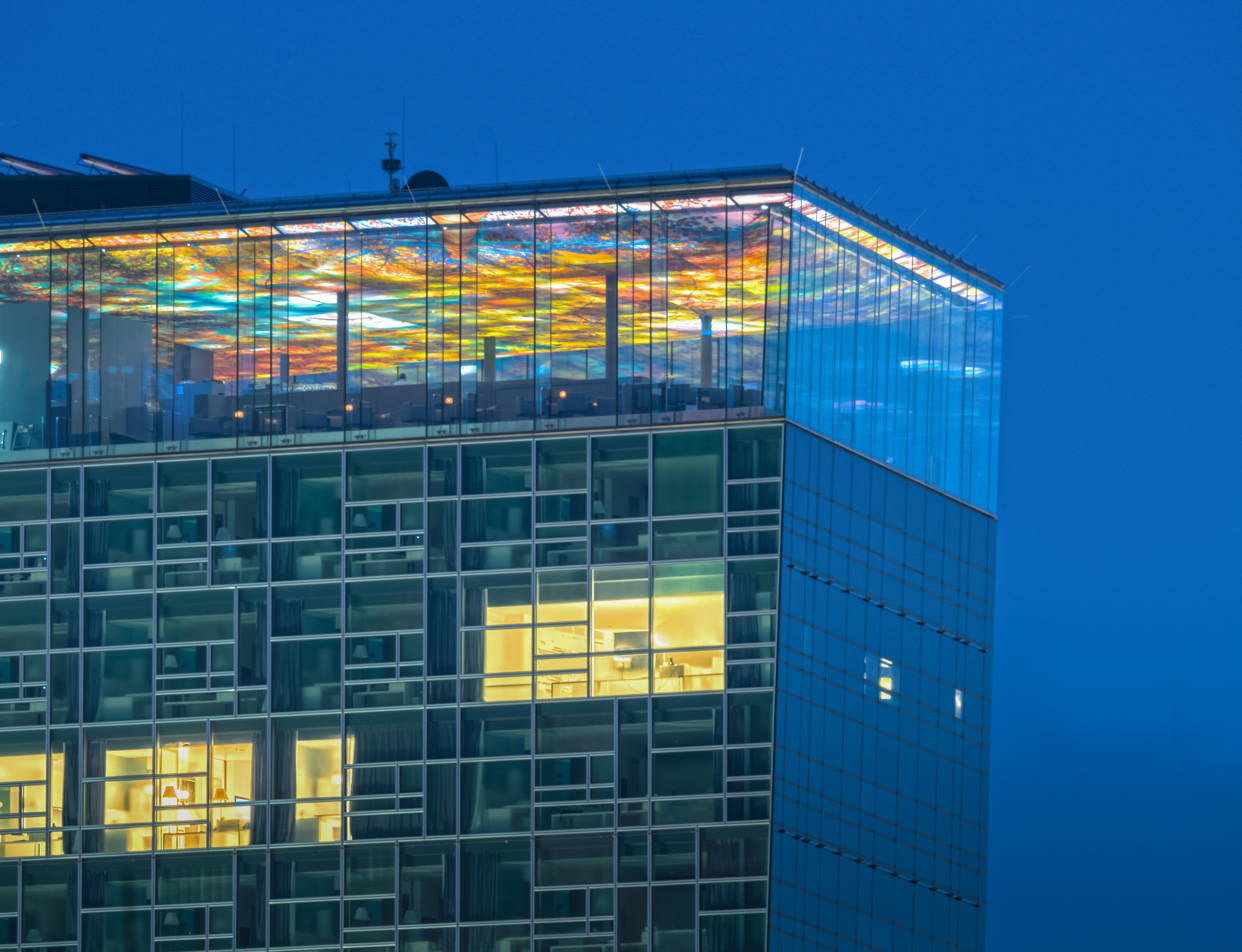
SO/ Vienna, by Jean Nouvel

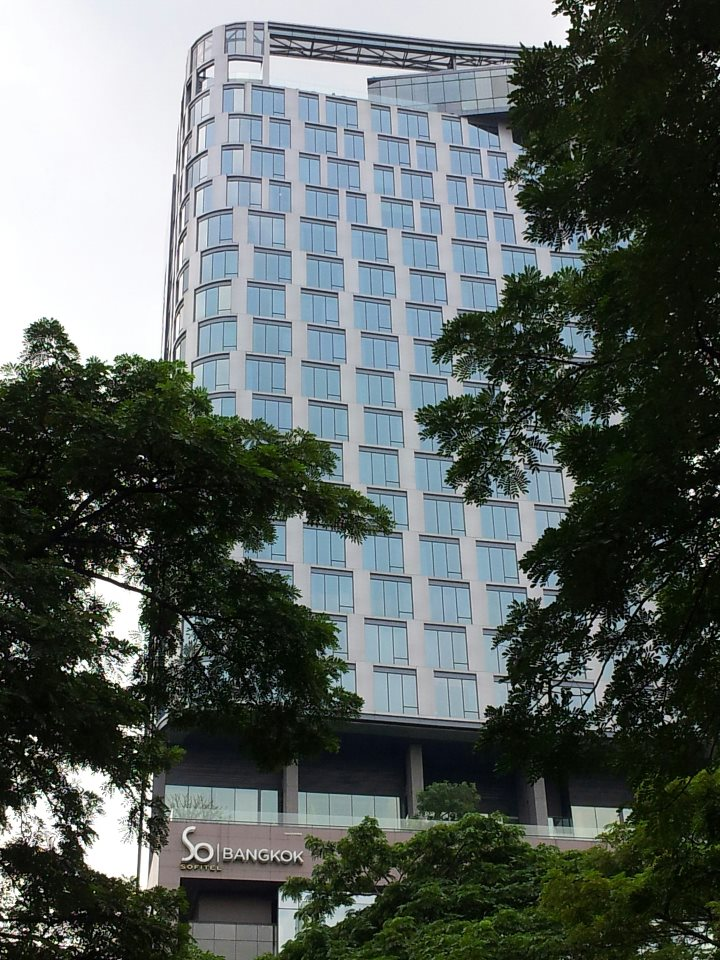
SO/ Bangkok
