= Jeffrey Kallberg =

American musicologist (born 1954)

- Born: October 17, 1954 (age 72); Glencoe, Minnesota, US
- Occupations: Musicologist, university professor, academic administrator
- Known for: Scholarship on Frédéric Chopin

Academic background
- Education: UCLA (BA); University of Chicago (MA)

Academic work
- Discipline: 19th and 20th-century classical music; critical theory and gender studies in music
- Institutions: University of Pennsylvania

Jeffrey Kallberg (born October 17, 1954) is an American musicologist who specializes 19th and 20th-century classical music, as well as topics in critical theory and gender studies related to music. He is a leading scholar on the life and works of the composer Frédéric Chopin, who is the subject of much of his research.

== Life and career ==
Jeffrey Kallberg was born on October 17, 1954, in Glencoe, Minnesota, US. He received a Bachelor of Arts at the University of California, Los Angeles in 1975 and Master of Arts at the University of Chicago in 1978. Since 1982, Kallberg has been on the faculty of the University of Pennsylvania, where be became an associate professor in 1987. Throughout his career he has held visiting professorships at the State University of New York, Harvard University and Princeton University.

Kallberg's research includes 19th and 20th-century classical music, as well as topics relating to critical theory and gender studies in music. In particular, he has written much on the composer and pianist Frédéric Chopin, including analysis of his life and works based on "style, formal structure, publication history and gender and ideological issues". In 2002, Kallberg published a realization of a fragmented and somewhat illegible prelude by Chopin, labeled Prelude No. 27, "Devil's Trill". He was also instrumental in authenticating Chopin's—possibly fragmented—rediscovered Waltz in A minor in 2024.

Kallberg is coeditor with Anthony Newcomb of the 'New Perspectives in Music History and Criticism' monograph series. He edited a critical edition of Verdi's Luisa Miller in 1991.

== Selected bibliography ==
- Kallberg, Jeffrey (1985). "Chopin's Last Style". Journal of the American Musicological Society. 38 (2): 264–315. doi:10.2307/831566. JSTOR 831566.
- —— (Summer 1992). "The Harmony of the Tea Table: Gender and Ideology in the Piano Nocturne". Representations. 39 (39): 102–133. doi:10.2307/2928597. JSTOR 2928597.
- —— (1994). "Small fairy voices: sex, history and meaning in Chopin". In Rink, John; Samson, Jim (eds.). Chopin Studies 2. Cambridge: Cambridge University Press. ISBN 978-0-521-03433-3.
- —— (1996). Chopin at the Boundaries: Sex, History, and Musical Genre. Cambridge: Cambridge University Press.
- —— (Summer 2001). "Chopin's March, Chopin's Death". 19th-Century Music. 25 (1): 3–26. doi:10.1525/ncm.2001.25.1.3. JSTOR 10.1525/ncm.2001.25.1.3.
