= Tope (restaurant) =

Mexican restaurant in Portland, Oregon, U.S.

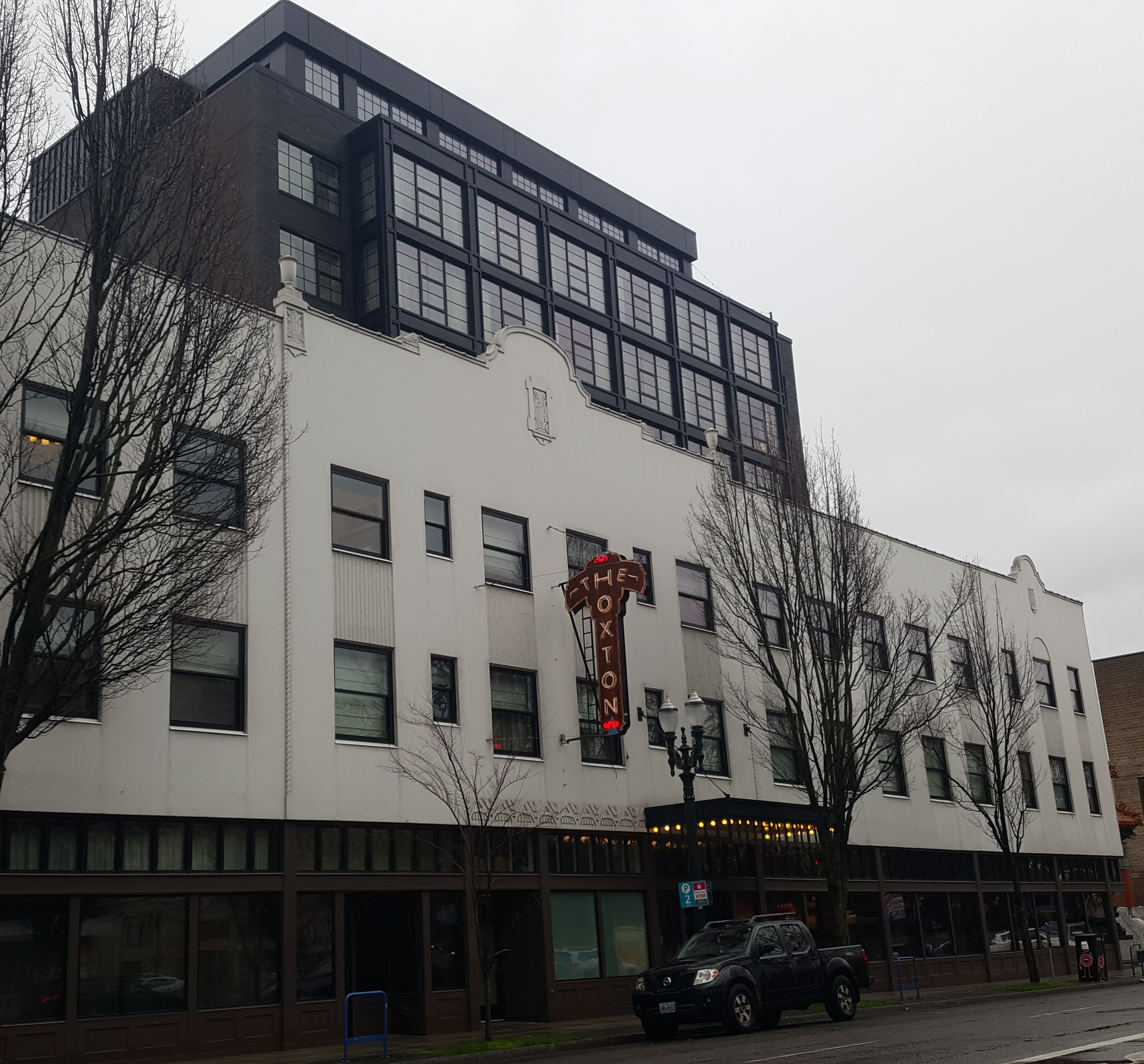
- Exterior of The Hoxton, Portland, in 2021
- Interactive map of Tope

Restaurant information
- Established: January 1, 2019
- Owner: Submarine Hospitality
- Food type: Mexican
- Location: 15 NW 4th Avenue, Portland, Multnomah, Oregon, United States
- Coordinates: 45°31′24″N 122°40′29″W

Tope is a Mexican restaurant in Portland, Oregon, United States. It has operated in The Hoxton, Portland, a hotel in the Northwest Portland part of Old Town Chinatown, since 2019. Submarine Hospitality is the owner.

Tope has served tacos, tlayuda, a Sonoran hot dog, empanadas with chorizo, churros with dulce de leche, and various cocktails, among other food and drink options. The restaurant has garnered a positive reception, especially for its tacos and its views.

== Description ==
The Mexican restaurant Tope operates on the ninth floor and rooftop of The Hoxton, Portland, a hotel on West Burnside Street in the Northwest Portland part of the Old Town Chinatown neighborhood. Eater Portland said the interior "resembles a hip 50something's conservatory", with plants, wicker furniture, and windows. There is also a fireplace and a long white bar. The bar has white-tiled walls and gold accents, a patio with lights and bistro tables, and views of downtown Portland. Eater Portland has described Tope as "busy", "buzzy", and "maximalist".

The website's Zoe Baillargeon has said the restaurant's view "encompasses all the quintessential landmarks of the Portland skyline", with the foreground "taken up by downtown's historic buildings, glassy skyscrapers, and the iconic Portland Stag, while Mount Hood looms on the horizon". The space can host weddings and private events. Willamette Week described Tope as dog-friendly, "swanky", and "good for large groups".

=== Menu ===
Tope has offered many taco varieties, including al pastor with pineapple, as well as beef tongue, carnitas, pork belly, quesabirria, and vegetarian options with cauliflower and mole or achiote-marinated soy curls. Tope has also served tlayuda, a cemita with fried chicken, a Sonoran hot dog, squash tacos, and Oregon rockfish ceviche with leche de tigre. Appetizers included chips and guacamole, as well as shrimp ceviche. The menu has also included empanadas with chorizo, milk-steamed mussels, shrimp flautas, and rockfish milanesa tortas. Desserts have included churros with dulce de leche, as well as flan.

Drink options have included the 'Anyway, Here's Wonderwall', which has Hendrick's gin, aloe, and grapefruit bitters, and the 'Carrot on My Wayward Son', which has Bahnez mezcal, carrot, and sweet potato. Some drinks have names referencing comedy films and television series; the 'A School for Ants' references Zoolander (2001) and has El Dorado rum, Proud Mary coffee, and amaretto, and the 'Mr. Manager' references the sitcom Arrested Development and has rum, Montenegro amaro, and cinnamon. The 'Opening Day' has citrus, coconut, and vanilla. Other drinks have included a version of the Last Word, a mezcal negroni, margaritas, beer, and wine. The Tope margarita has Pueblo Viejo and Combier and the spicy variety has Ancho Reyes Verde and arbol tincture.

== History ==
In September 2018, media outlets described plans for Submarine Hospitality, the owner of Ava Gene's and Tusk, to open Tope in partnership with The Hoxton. In October 2018, Brooke Jackson-Glidden described plans for Tope to open on November 29, 2018. The opening date was delayed. Tope hosted a New Year's Eve party on December 31, 2018, and began operating properly on January 1 (New Year's Day), 2019. Johnny Leach was the opening chef. In 2019, Tope hosted a series of dinners in collaboration with chefs from Mexican restaurants across the nation. When the hotel's Mexican restaurant La Neta was replaced by Lovely Rita in 2019, Leach migrated some of La Neta's dishes to Tope.

Tope hosted a New Year's Eve party leading up to 2020, featuring dancing and a champagne toast. Like many restaurants, Tope stopped operating temporarily upon the arrival of the COVID-19 pandemic. The restaurant reopened in July 2020, but then did not operate from November 2020 to April 2021. Tope operated at limited seating capacities to comply with regulations and at times was the hotel's only open restaurant. B.J. Smith became the chef in 2020. Joel Lui-Kwan became the chef in 2021.

Adán Fausto became the executive chef in January 2026. He updated the menu at Tope as well as the hotel's "basement speakeasy" called 2NW5. For Tope, Fausto implemented a menu of tacos inspired by Baja California and Mexico City, as well as his signature shrimp flautas and rockfish milanesa tortas.

== Reception ==
Michael Russell of The Oregonian called Tope popular and a "smash hit" in 2019. Chiara Profenna included the business in the newspaper's 2023 list of twelve rooftop bars in the city "for every occasion", claiming Tope offered the best atmosphere. In 2016, Russell said Tope had the city's best taco. Willamette Week included Tope in a 2021 overview of "our favorite Portland patios for after-work drinks".

Alex Frane included the Carrot on My Wayward Son in Eater Portland's 2019 list of eleven "impressive" cocktails from the city's newest bars and restaurants. In 2021, the website's Jordan Michelman included the business in a list of nine hotel bars in the city "ideal for a mid-week drink" and opined, "The food and drinks here are great, but the people watching is particularly exquisite — Tope has fast become a who's who of Portland's arts, design, and culture scene. Wear your cool sneakers." Jackson-Glidden included Tope in the website's 2025 list of the city's eight best rooftops "for views, drinks, and sun". Frane included the business in a 2025 list of Portland's best margaritas. The website's Zoe Baillargeon included Tope in a 2026 overview of the city's best restaurants with views.

== See also ==
- Hispanics and Latinos in Portland, Oregon
- List of Mexican restaurants
