= The Hoxton, Portland =

Hotel in Portland, Oregon, U.S.

- Logo

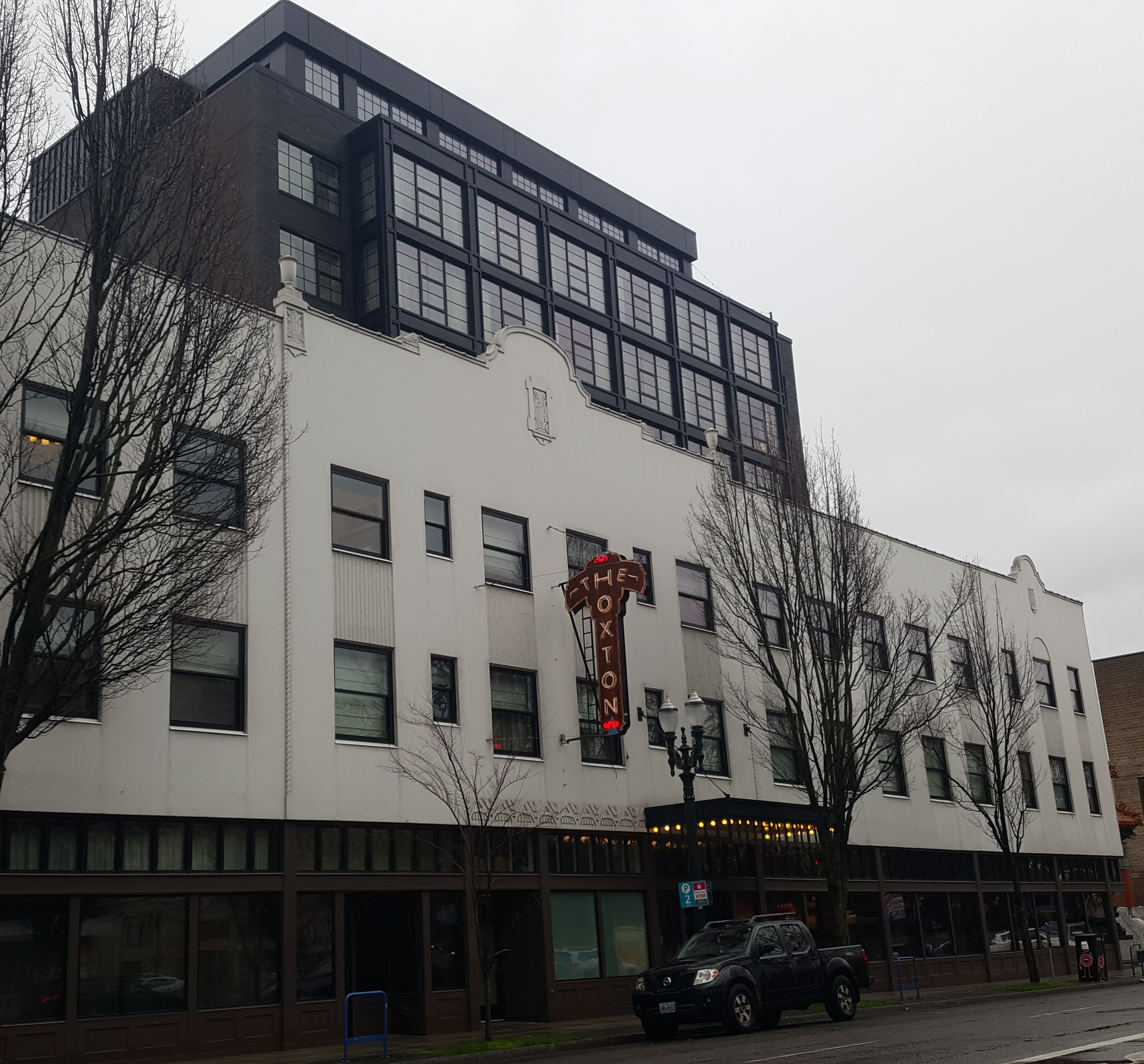
- The hotel's exterior in 2021

General information
- Location: Portland, Oregon, United States
- Coordinates: 45°31′24.6″N 122°40′28.5″W
- Opened: 2018

Other information
- Number of rooms: 119

The Hoxton, Portland is a hotel in Portland, Oregon's Old Town Chinatown neighborhood, in the United States.

== Description and history ==
The 119-room hotel is part of the European chain. The property includes the renovated three-story Grove Hotel, which opened in 1907, as well as a nine-story addition.

Fodor's has described The Hoxton as a "see-and-be-seen" hotel with a "chic" lobby and a "vintage-chic" aesthetic. Lonely Planet has said the hotel has an "airy, Northwestern modernist" aesthetic with "clean lines, natural materials and mid-century accents". A guide book by Moon Publications has called the hotel "hip" with exposed brick and timber beams. Condé Nast Traveler has said "the open lobby’s quiet luxury offers a soothing contrast to Old Town Chinatown’s grit and hustle, luring out-of-towners and locals alike with its exposed brick walls, raw concrete columns, original timber beams, cushy velvet couches and armchairs".

== History ==
The hotel opened on November 12, 2018.

=== Restaurants ===
The hotel has had a lobby restaurant called La Neta, a rooftop taqueria called Tope, and a speakeasy in the basement. La Neta was replaced by Lovely Rita in 2019.

Ethan and Geri Leung of Baon Kainan began operating the Filipino restaurant Pamana at the hotel in 2025. In August 2026, the couple announced plans to open a second Pamana location in northeast Portland, in the space that previously housed Expatriate.

Deadstock Coffee is slated to begin operating in the hotel's lobby cafe in 2026.

== Reception ==
Alex Sims included The Hoxton in Time Out Portland's 2024 list of the city's best hotels. The Daily Telegraph included the property in a 2026 list of Oregon's best hotels.
