= Francian =

Francian may refer to:

- Francians
- the Francian dialect

== See also ==
- Francien
