= Königsmünster Abbey =

Benedictine monastery in Germany

Coordinates: 51°21′14″N 8°16′48″E

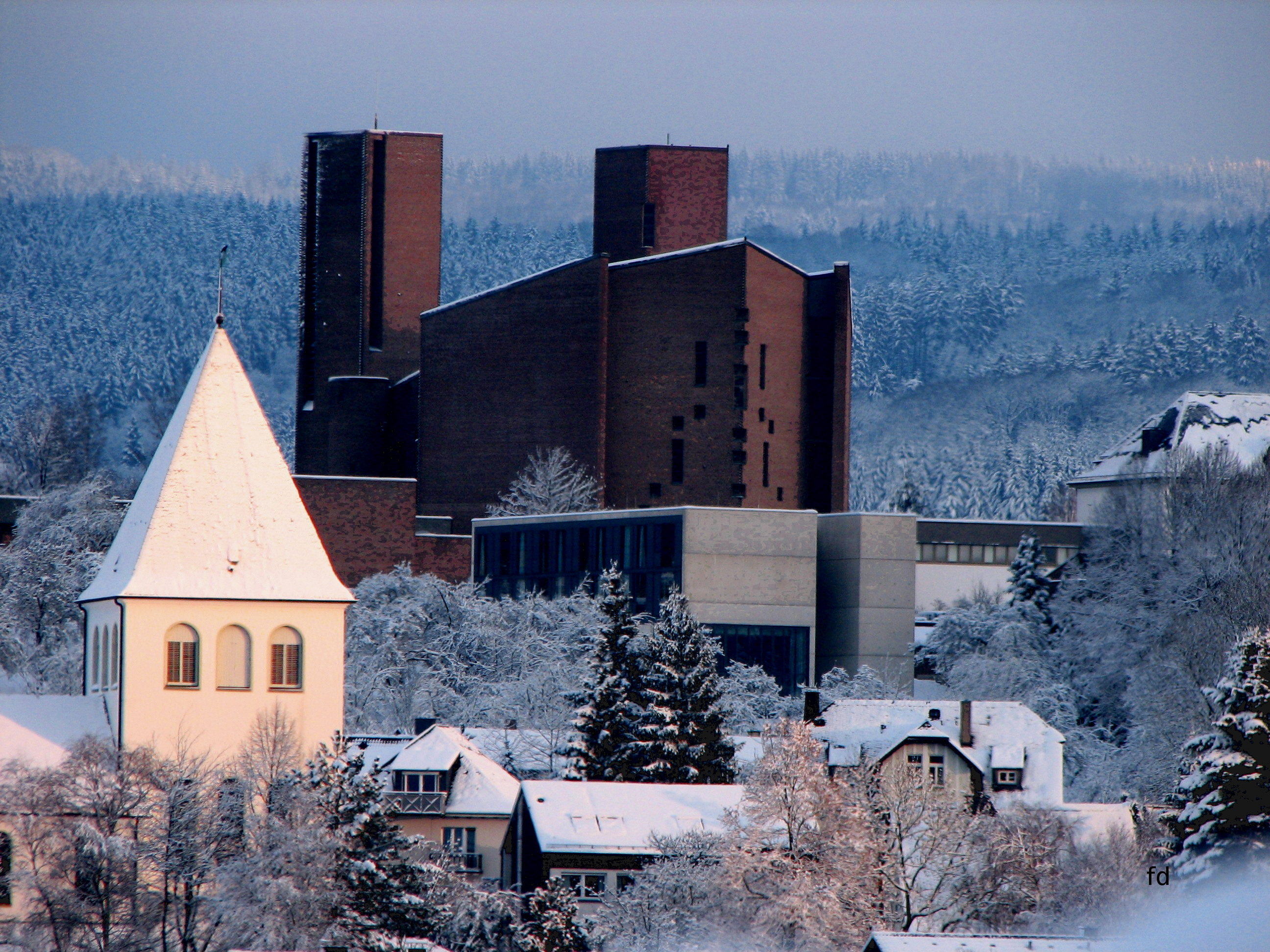
The abbey in winter

Königsmünster Abbey is a Benedictine abbey (belonging to the Benedictine Congregation of Saint Ottilien) in Meschede, Germany.

== History ==
The abbey was founded in 1928, from three abbeys in Bavaria. The contract between the city of Meschede and the Benedictine congregation stipulated that the monks would take over the local Rektoratsschule, and would in return receive financial support for the construction of the abbey. A competition for the design of the abbey was won by Franz Schneider, who drew up a symmetrical building centered around a church facade. The name Königsmünster means "monastery of the King” (that is, Christ).

The monks followed the tradition of Grafschaft Abbey in the Sauerland (it had been dissolved in 1804). From the weapon of that abbey, Königsmünster took the antlers, and its monks compiled a necrology of the Grafschaft monks.

The abbey became an independent conventual priory in 1932, with Linus Leberle (1880–1956) as its first prior. Alban Buckel was prior from 1937 to 1956. In 1941 the National Socialists confiscated the monastery and expelled the monks.

As of 2021, 48 monks lived in the abbey.

The abbey church was built in the early sixties and consecrated in 1964.

As a member of the Congregation of Saint Ottilien, the monks primary apostolate is mission work. The abbey also runs two retreat houses. It has a metalworks shop that produces among other things jewelry, and liturgical equipment such as altars, crosses, and candlesticks, etc.

== Secondary School ==
The “Gymnasium der Benediktiner”, is a gymnasium that belongs to the Abbey. Some monks of the abbey teach religion or other subjects at the school.

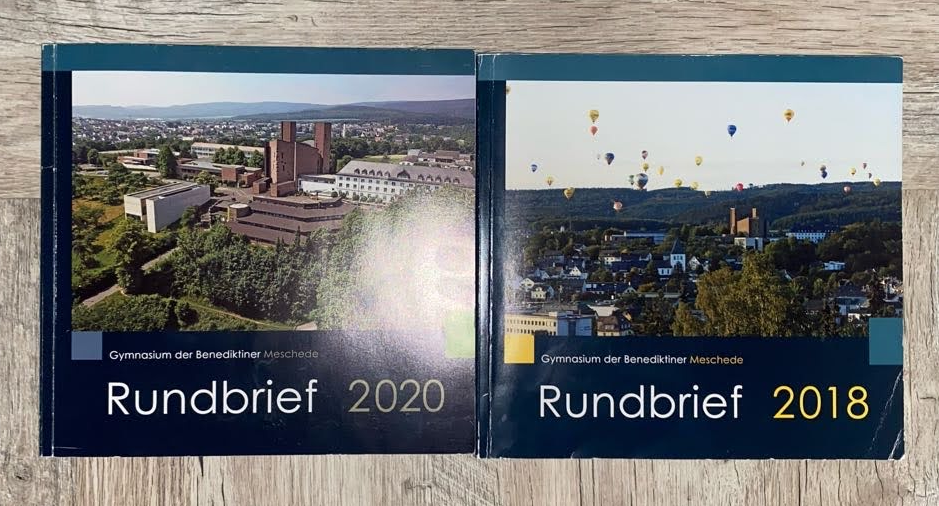
Rundbriefe 2018 and 2020 of the Gymnasium der Benediktiner
