= European Business School London =

Former private business school in Regent's Park, London

Coordinates: 51°31′33″N 0°9′18″W

- Type: Business School
- Established: 1979
- Dean: Jane Houzer (Interim)
- Students: 900
- Location: Regent's University London, Inner Circle, Regent's Park, London, United Kingdom
- Campus: Urban
- Website: www.regents.ac.uk

European Business School London (EBS London) was a private business school in Regent's Park, Central London, England. It was a constituent school of Regent's College London, which became Regent's University London in 2013.

EBS London offered courses in the field of International Business Management and had a strong focus on Banking and Finance, reflected by the fact that a third of its graduates pursued a career in that field. Besides its focus on teaching, the university had a long-standing commitment to research, offering MPhil and PhD degrees.

Around 900 students from more than 85 nationalities made the School highly international. It also had as strong focus on languages, with 70% of its graduates being fluent in at least four languages. EBS has a strong representation of all nations especially Russian, Spanish, Italian and French.

== History ==
Founded in 1979, European Business School was an international institution with campuses in London, Paris, Frankfurt (Oestrich-Winkel) and Milan which had a pioneering influence on the European model of education. In 1985, though still co-operating and exchanging students, the EBS schools became independent. Each school kept the EBS name but added the city name after. European Business School London (EBSL), EBS Universität für Wirtschaft und Recht and European Business School Paris are the remaining European Business Schools. EBS London was part of the business faculty of Regent's College London until it became Regent's University London in 2013.

== Programmes ==
Core of the undergraduate programme was the BA (hons) degrees in International Business. Further undergraduate courses at the business faculty included a BA (hons) in International Events Management.

Master's level courses were available in the fields of general management, banking and finance, entrepreneurship and marketing, including a full-time MBA in International Business.

=== MBA Programme ===
The MBA in International Business was a 12-month full-time programme. The EBS London MBA has been validated by the EQUIS and AACSB accredited Open University as associated organisation.

A compulsory study period abroad is an element of the course. EBS London MBA students can choose from the following partner universities:

- Copenhagen Business School, Copenhagen, Denmark
- Lubin School of Business, New York, United States of America
- Concordia University, Canada
- City University of Hong Kong, Hong Kong, China

== Research ==
Research active faculty members were involved in the Regent's Centre for Transnational Studies (RCTS), the Centre for Banking and Finance (CBF), and the Institute of Contemporary European Studies (iCES), which organised the prestigious Jean Monnet and 'Europe in the World' lectures.

== Partner institutions ==
EBS London had around 70 partner universities all over the world, notable institutions include the Université Paris-Dauphine and EDHEC in France, Solvay Brussels School of Economics and Management in Belgium, Copenhagen Business School in Denmark, Université Laval and John Molson School of Business in Canada, City University in Hong Kong, Pace University in the United States of America and the Fundação Getúlio Vargas in Brazil.

== Scholarships ==
European Business School London offered one full scholarship and two-half scholarships per year.

== Notable alumni ==
- Kathrine Fredriksen (born 1983), Norwegian businesswoman
- Lady Kitty Spencer (born 1990), English model
- Lapo Elkann (born 1977), American-Italian businessman and Agnelli-heir
- Sultan Muhammad V (born 1969), Sultan State of Kelantan
- Zoë Tryon (born 1974), British "eco-aristocrat"
- Eleonore von Habsburg (born 1994), jewellery designer, gemologist, model, and member of the House of Habsburg-Lorraine.
