= The Hoxton =

British hotel chain

- Type: Private
- Industry: Hospitality, Hotels
- Founded: 2006 in London, England
- Headquarters: Southwark, London
- Number of locations: 14
- Owner: Ennismore
- Website: The Hoxton

The Hoxton is a British hotel chain owned by Ennismore.

== History ==
The Hoxton brand was founded in 2006 by Sinclair Beecham, co-founder of Pret A Manger. It launched with The Hoxton, Shoreditch, built on a former car park on Great Eastern Street in East London. In 2012, Ennismore, owned by Sharan Pasricha, acquired The Hoxton, Shoreditch and the brand. Pasricha has held the position of CEO since 2012. In 2013, Ennismore initiated a refurbishment and rebranding programme.

== Locations ==
The Hoxton opened its first site in London's Shoreditch in 2006, before expanding to London's Holborn in 2014, Amsterdam in 2015, and Paris in 2017. They opened a further two hotels in 2018, one in Brooklyn's Williamsburg, then The Hoxton, Portland, followed by properties in Chicago, London's Southwark, and Downtown Los Angeles in 2019 before a 2021 opening in Rome. Most recently, The Hoxton opened in Barcelona (2022), followed by a fourth London hotel in Shepherd's Bush (2022), Berlin and Brussels in 2023, Vienna in 2024 and Dublin in 2025.

The Dublin hotel caused controversy in February 2025 by seeking an injunction against Yamamori Izakaya, a long-established live music bar and restaurant beside it.

== See also ==
- The Hoxton, Portland
- Ennismore (company)
- Sharan Pasricha
