= Ganz kleine Nachtmusik =

Rediscovered composition by W. A. Mozart

- by Wolfgang Amadeus Mozart
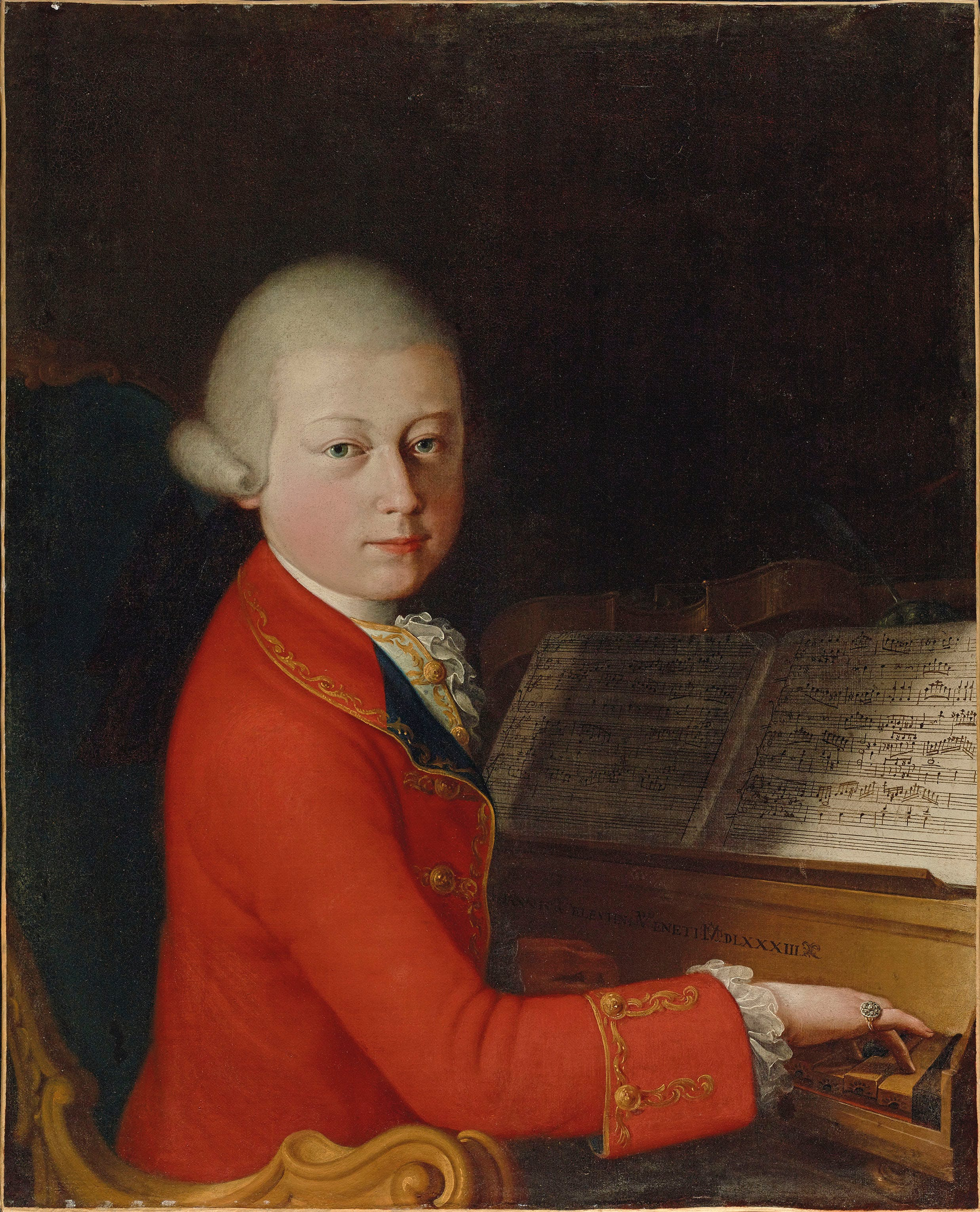
- Portrait of Mozart at age 13 (January 1770)
- English: Quite Little Night Music
- Key: C major
- Catalogue: K. 648
- Composed: mid to late 1760s
- Duration: about 12 minutes
- Movements: 7
- Scoring: String trio

Ganz kleine Nachtmusik (German for Very Little Night Music), K. 648, also known as Serenade in C, is a composition for string trio by Wolfgang Amadeus Mozart (1756–1791), written in the mid to late 1760s. It was named by the Leipzig municipal libraries, where the piece's rediscovery was announced in September 2024. "The newly discovered Serenade in C [was] renamed Ganz kleine Nachtmusik in the Köchel catalog (presumably in reference to Mozart's famous serenade Eine kleine Nachtmusik)".

== Composition ==
The piece itself is a string trio (for two violins and one cello) written while Mozart was a young teenager, apparently before his first trip to Italy. It consists of "seven miniature movements for a string trio lasting about 12 minutes" according to the Leipzig libraries. It might be identical to the lost "Little night music" K. 41g, or the lost Cassation in C, K. 653.

== Rediscovery ==
While compiling the Köchel catalogue's newest edition – an authoritative list of all of Mozart's documented musical works – classical music researchers rediscovered the manuscript of the previously unknown piece from the Carl Ferdinand Becker collection in Leipzig's music library. The researchers reported that the manuscript was in "dark brown ink on medium-white handmade paper" with individually bound parts. The manuscript was believed not to be an original manuscript written by Mozart, but a copy produced in 1780.

German musicologist Ulrich Leisinger, speaking for the International Mozarteum Foundation in Salzburg, stated that the piece was unique compared to other pieces produced by Mozart at the time, which were primarily arias, symphonies, and piano music.

On 19 September 2024, the rediscovered piece was first played for a modern audience at the Mozarteum in Salzburg, Austria, by Haruna Shinoyama and Neža Klinar (violins), Philipp Comploi (cello) and Florian Birsak (harpsichord), with a further performance in Germany on 21 September by Vincent and David Geer (violins) and Elisabeth Zimmermann (cello) at the Leipzig Opera.

The first commercial recording was released by Deutsche Grammophon featuring the Leipzig Gewandhaus Orchestra conducted by Herbert Blomstedt on 18 October 2024.

== See also ==
- Waltz in A minor (Chopin, rediscovered 2024), whose rediscovery was announced the following month (in October 2024)
