= Kathrine Fredriksen =

Norwegian businesswoman (born 1983)

- Born: Kathrine Astrup Fredriksen; 29 September 1983 (age 42); London, England
- Education: European Business School London
- Occupation: Businesswoman
- Board member of: Norwegian Property
- Parent(s): John Fredriksen; Inger Astrup Fredriksen

Kathrine Astrup Fredriksen (born 29 September 1983) is a Norwegian businesswoman. She is a board member of one of Norway's biggest listed real estate companies, Norwegian Property, and has previously been on the boards of Seadrill, Golar LNG, Frontline and Deep Sea Supply. Fredriksen oversees the Fredriksen family's investments and is involved in high level decisions as well as administration of the organization.

Fredriksen is heiress to her family's shipping fortune, valued at $16.4 billion by Forbes in 2013, when her father John Fredriksen was the world's 48th richest person.

== Early life ==
Kathrine was born in London, England, the daughter of shipping-tycoon John Fredriksen and art-collector Inger Astrup Fredriksen. Together with her twin sister Cecilie, she grew up in their family homes in London, Cyprus, Spain and Oslo. When Kathrine was 23, her mother died from cancer. The same year, the Fredriksen family donated 50 million NOK to cancer research.

== Education ==
Fredriksen studied at Wang Handelsgymnas in Oslo, followed by a degree at European Business School London in 2006.

== Career ==
After university, Fredriksen spent extensive time in Asia to learn more about the shipping business. In February 2008 she became a board member of Frontline, one of the world's largest shipping companies. In 2014 Fredriksen and her family were listed as the 6th richest people in Britain with a combined wealth of £9.25bn on The Sunday Times Rich List. James Winchester, a veteran shipping analyst at Lazard Frères has said of him, "He's a modern-day Onassis. The tanker king. He landed squarely in the sweet spot of the tanker cycle, with the largest fleet of ships." In 2001 an article on Forbes.com described him as having "a tanker fleet bigger than anything Aristotle Onassis ever had." in Forbes Magazine.

In 2009, Fredriksen was named one of the world's most promising female heiresses by Forbes Magazine. She is known for being very private and rarely speaks to the press.

Fredriksen has held directorships on several boards:

- SeaDrill: Director of the Board since September 2008
- Golar LNG: Director of the Board since February 2008
- Golar LNG Energy Ltd: Director of the Board
- Deep Sea Supply: Director of the Board since May 2009
- Independent Tankers Corp: Director of the Board
- Frontline: Director of the Board

== Fashion ==
Fredriksen has expressed a keen interest in art, design and fashion and is on the council of Serpentine Gallery.

In 2012, Fredriksen started working with the Georgian-born London based fashion designer David Koma, who graduated with a distinction in MA Fashion from Central Saint Martins College of Art and Design in 2009.
