= Sharan Pasricha =

Indian entrepreneur (born 1980)

Sharan Pasricha MBE
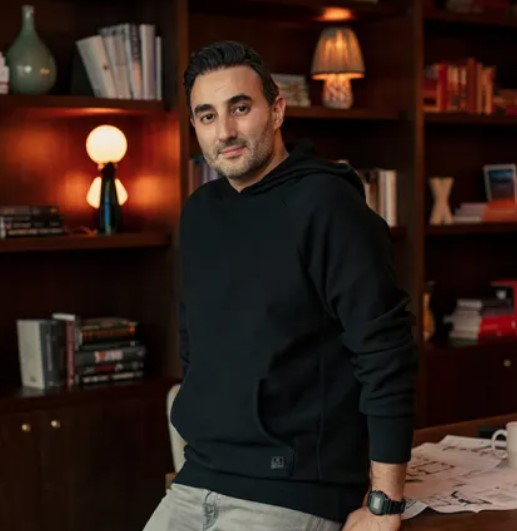
- Born: 19 October 1980 (age 46); India
- Education: London Business School; Regent's College; Doon School
- Occupation: Business executive
- Known for: Founder and Chairman of the hospitality company Ennismore
- Spouse: Eiesha Bharti Pasricha (m. 2009)
- Children: 2
- Family: Sunil Mittal (Father in-law), Kavin Bharti Mittal (brother in-law)
- Website: ennismore.com

Sharan Pasricha MBE (born 1980 in Mumbai, India) is a hotelier based in London. In 2011 he founded hotel company Ennismore, which bought The Hoxton in London's Shoreditch in 2012 and Scotland's Gleneagles Hotel in 2015, and then grew The Hoxton into an international chain. In 2021 Ennismore became a joint venture with Accor, with Pasricha as co-CEO. He is now its founder and president. He also founded and runs Estelle Community, the group behind the members' clubs Maison Estelle in Mayfair and Estelle Manor in Oxfordshire. He is married to Eiesha Bharti Pasricha, daughter of the Indian telecom businessman Sunil Bharti Mittal, whose family has put money into his hotel businesses.

== Early life and education ==
Pasricha was educated at the Doon School in India and Millfield School in Somerset. He completed an Accounting & Finance degree from Regent's College and an MBA from London Business School where he was awarded the Alumni GOLD (Graduate of the Last Decade) by the Dean in 2018.

== Early career ==
While at Regent's College, Pasricha founded RUSH! Media, a marketing agency based in London. He spent three years running the business after leaving university in London before returning to India to run his uncle's leather manufacturing business. He spent three years as a turnaround CEO in New Delhi. In 2009, he returned to England to do his MBA, while working at a private equity investment firm, Better Capital.

== Ennismore ==
Upon completing his MBA in 2011, Pasricha founded Ennismore and tried to acquire Soho House with the help of its founder Nick Jones. A year later, Ennismore acquired the Hoxton Hotel in Shoreditch. In November 2012, Ennismore acquired an office building in Holborn which would later become The Hoxton, Holborn. The following year Pasricha launched The Hoxton, Amsterdam. In 2017, The Hoxton, Paris opened following a 4-year restoration of an 18th-century hôtel particulier, designated a 'monument historique' by the French state. It opened its first US location with The Hoxton, Williamsburg, in 2018, followed shortly by Portland, Chicago and Downtown LA. In Europe, London's third Hoxton opened in Southwark in the same year, with Rome, Barcelona and Shepherd's Bush opening in 2021. In 2023, the Hoxton opened in Brussels, Berlin and a second outpost in Amsterdam. 2024 marked the opening of the Hoxton’s Vienna location. In 2025, the Hoxton opened its Edinburgh and Dublin hotels.

In 2015, Pasricha led the acquisition of the Gleneagles Hotel in Perthshire which was owned by drinks company Diageo. Since 2016, the hotel has undergone over 12 major renovation projects including The Century Bar; The American Bar; The Birnam Brasserie; Dormy Restaurant and Auchterarder 70; Ochil House; Bob & Cloche; and Little Glen & The Den. The refurbishment programme has been attributed to a jump in revenues and operating profits to more than £1 million per week during 2018. Gleneagles has won a number of awards. Pasricha has expanded the brand with the opening of Gleneagles Townhouse. It is the brand’s first opening in nearly 100 years and launched in Edinburgh, comprising a hotel, restaurants, bars and member’s club. It was named “Best Hotel” by the GQ Food & Drinks Awards 2023.

Pasricha has founded several new brands, including a coworking brand Working From_, a community workspace in 2019, as well as Maison Estelle, the private members club in Mayfair, London and in 2018 acquired Eynsham Hall, reopening the property in spring 2023 as Estelle Manor.

Pasricha occasionally speaks at entrepreneurial and hospitality industry conferences.

In 2020 it was announced that Pasricha created a joint venture with Europe’s largest hotel company Accor. The merger completed in October 2021. The new entity operates under the Ennismore name and is two-thirds owned by Accor and a third by Pasricha. In 2022, Ennismore was valued at more than €2 billion when Accor sold over 10% of its stake in Ennismore to a Qatari consortium. He became co-CEO of the company, alongside the chief development officer at Accor, Gaurav Bhushan.

In 2026, it was announced that Pasricha would be stepping down from his role as co-CEO alongside Gaurav Bhushan, with Bhushan serving as sole CEO and Pasricha retaining a Chairman role.

== Recognition ==
Pasricha was appointed Member of the Order of the British Empire (MBE) in the 2022 Birthday Honours for services to the hotel industry.

In 2018, he appeared in The Caterer Top 100, placing #68 overall and #14 among hoteliers. He also featured in Conde Nast Traveller's '48 People Changing The Way We Travel'. In 2019, he was named as one of the 50 Most Influential People in British Luxury. Pasricha featured in Tatler’s Social Power Index 2024. He won the Cateys 2024 International Outstanding Achievement Award. Under Pasricha's leadership, Ennismore was included the Financial Times’ FT1000: Europe's fastest growing companies.

== Personal life ==
Pasricha married to Eiesha Bharti Pasricha in 2009. They have two children. Sharan's father-in-law is Sunil Mittal, the founder and CEO of Bharti Airtel and brother-in-law is Kavin Bharti Mittal, the founder and CEO of hike Messenger.
