= Giraudi =

Diversified corporation

- Founder: Erminio Giraudi
- Headquarters: Monaco, Monaco
- Owner: Riccardo Giraudi
- Website: Official website ..

Giraudi Group is a conglomerate based in the Principality of Monaco. Primarily known as an importer/exporter in the meat industry, the group also owns several restaurants and retail chains. It was founded by Erminio Giraudi in the 1960s and employs 340 people in Monaco and a total of 700 people worldwide.

== History ==
Initially, Giraudi was an import / export company in the meat industry founded by Erminio Giraudi in the 1960s. The company established in Monaco in the mid-1970s.

Subsequently, the company expanded and diversified into other activities such as hospitality and lifestyle, through Riccardo Giraudi, Erminio's son.

== Business Activities ==
=== Meat industry ===
Progressively, Giraudi became one of the European leaders in meat import / export.

The Monaco based company is also the leading exporter of French beef and Dutch veal, as well as being the European leader in the import of hormone-free American Black Angus beef and Australian Black Angus beef.

Since 2014, Giraudi has become an importer of certified Japanese Kobe beef in Europe.

In 2015, Giraudi launched its own ranges of processed meats: Gourmet Boutique Burgers, Kobe Kreations. In the Kobe Kreations range, Riccardo Giraudi has, among other things, created the Kobe Jamon de Buey, a certified Japanese Kobe beef ham.

=== Hospitality ===
The meat business and know-how allowed Riccardo Giraudi to create the first Beefbar restaurant in 2005, in Monaco. Since then, Beefbar has become an international brand with restaurants on all continents.

In 2017, Beefbar Hong Kong received its first Star in the Hong Kong & Macau Michelin Guide.

Beefbar is part of Riccardo Giraudi's brand portfolio which also gathers other hospitality concepts in Monaco (Zeffirino 1939, Cantinetta Antinori, Babek Kebab, Song Qi, Izakaya, Moshi Moshi, Grubers etc) and abroad, as well as a delivery platform called Delovery.

Riccardo Giraudi also created the famous Pantone Cafe in Monaco.

In 2017, Riccardo Giraudi bought the restaurant Anahi in Paris, whose menu is now created by Chef Mauro Colagreco.

=== Lifestyle ===
Giraudi's lifestyle business is divided into two companies:

- Fashion Factory: since 2006, the company has specialised in the destocking of major Italian fashion brands;
- Miss Bibi: created by Brigitte Giraudi, daughter of Erminio Giraudi and sister of Riccardo Giraudi; it is a brand of jewellery and accessories whose first boutique opened in the Palais Royal in Paris.

== Human resources ==
Giraudi Group has, all activities combined, approximately 400 employees in Monaco, and a total of almost 1000 employees worldwide.
