= Riccardo Giraudi =

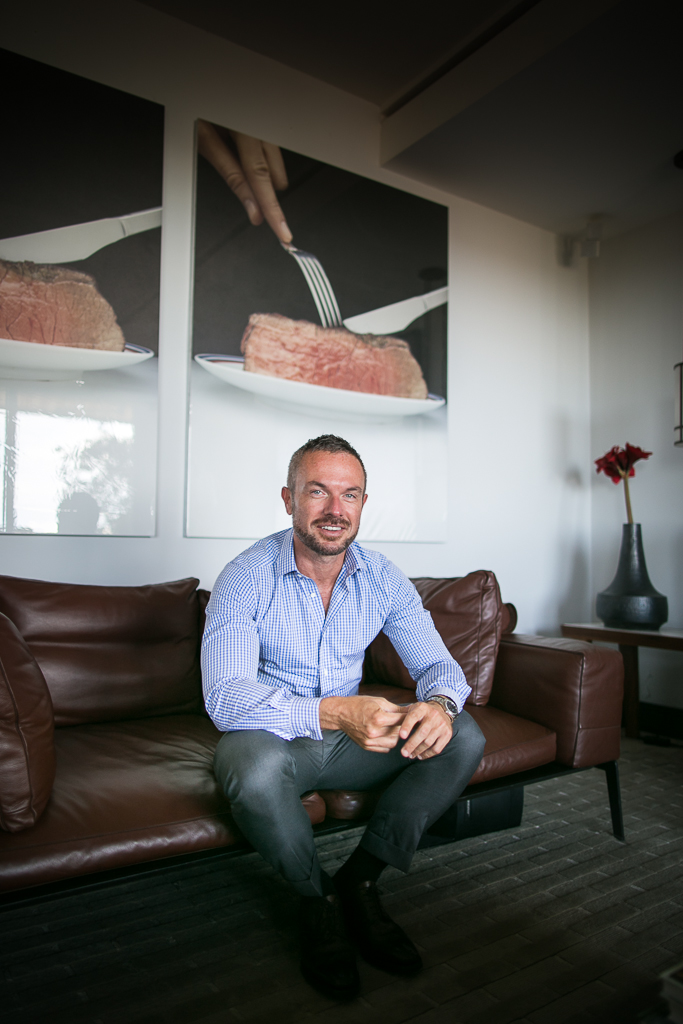
- Born: 14 November 1975 (age 50); Genoa
- Education: European Business School, London
- Occupations: Meat import/export, hospitality, consultant
- Title: CEO of Giraudi Group
- Awards: PROFESSIONAL - Michelin star in Hong Kong since 2017; Wallpaper Design Awards; Best new restaurant by Conde Nast Traveller; Top 50 Monocle Restaurant Awards; Best steakhouse by Timeout magazine; Restaurant & Bar Design Awards; Restaurateur of the Year. PRIVATE - Knight of the order of star of Italy; Officer of the Equatorial star of Gabon; Goodwill Ambassador of the Principality of Monaco.

Riccardo Giraudi (born 14 November 1975 in Genoa) is the CEO of Giraudi Group.

== Biography ==
Riccardo Giraudi grew up in the Principality of Monaco before studying at the European Business School of London where he obtained a Bachelor in Business Administration in 1999.

== Career ==
In 2001, Riccardo Giraudi joined the family-owned company created by his father, Erminio Giraudi in the 1970s : Giraudi Group. The group is one of the European leader in meat import / export (40% veal, 30% beef, 10% pork).

While becoming the European leader in the import of hormone free American Black Angus in 2005, Riccardo Giraudi introduced Australian beef and became in 2014 the first importer of certified Japanese Kobe beef in Europe.

A few months later, Riccardo Giraudi launched the Jamon de Buey de Kobe, a Japanese Kobe beef ham with which he notably won the Wallpaper Design Award 2018, "Best Working Lunch" category.

Since 2005, Riccardo Giraudi also develops "luxury casual" and "fast casual" hospitality concepts, in Monaco, Paris and abroad.

== Restaurants ==
=== Europe ===
- Beefbar, Monaco
- Beefbar Butcher Shop, Monaco
- Song Qi, Monaco
- Zeffirino 1939, Monaco
- Izakaya, Monaco
- Moshi Moshi, Monaco
- Cantinetta Antinori, Monaco
- Cantinetta Antinori, London
- Grubers Burgers, Monaco
- Pizz'Aria, Fréjus
- Babek Kebab, Monaco
- Delovery, delivery service, Monaco
- Beefbar, Paris
- Anahi, with a menu created by Mauro Colagreco, Paris
- Beefbar on the Coast, Mykonos
- Beefbar Lou Pinet, Saint Tropez
- Beefbar on the Beach, Malta
- Beefbar in the City, Malta
- Beefbar, Santorini
- Beefbar Le Coucou, Meribel
- Beefbar Astir Palace, Athens
- Beefbar Cala di Volpe, Porto Cervo
- Beefbar, Milano
- Beefbar, Luxembourg
- Le Petit Beefbar, London
- Le Petit Beefbar, Edinburgh
- Le Petit Beefbar, Paris
- Le Petit Beefbar, Nice
- Le Petit Beefbar, Strasbourg
- African Queen, Beaulieu-sur Mer in collaboration with Patrick Gioannini and Philippe Schriqui
- Zeffirino 1939, Paris
- Rumore, Milan

=== America ===
- Beefbar Esencia, Riviera Maya
- Beefbar Jardim, São Paulo with Felipe Massa
- Beefbar, New York
- Beefbar, St Barth in the Barrière Hotel
- Song Qi, São Paulo

=== Middle East & Africa ===
- Beefbar, Dubai
- Le Petit Beefbar, Dubai
- Beefbar, Riyadh
- Beefbar, Doha
- Beefbar Asia, Doha
- Beefbar, North Coast
- Beefbar, Kuwait

=== Asia ===
- Beefbar Central, Hong Kong

=== At Sea ===
Since 2024, Beefbar has operated restaurants aboard the luxury cruise ships Crystal Serenity and Crystal Symphony, marking the brand's first at-sea location. Beefbar is also planned to be featured aboard Crystal Grace, the third ship in Crystal's fleet, scheduled to enter service in 2028.

=== Awards ===
Since 2017, Beefbar Hong Kong is Michelin starred in the "Hong Kong & Macau Michelin Guide" "Guide Michelin Hong Kong & Macau".

Beefbar Paris is elected best steakhouse by Time Out., is ranked in the Top 50 of Monocle Restaurant Awards and won the RESTAURANT & BAR DESIGN AWARDS, in the "Heritage Building" category

Beefbar Milan won the RESTAURANT & BAR DESIGN AWARDS in the "Hotel - Europe" category in 2023.

== Other activities ==
Since 2007, Riccardo Giraudi is appointed Honorary Consul of Gabon in the Principality of Monaco.
