= Mondrian Doha =

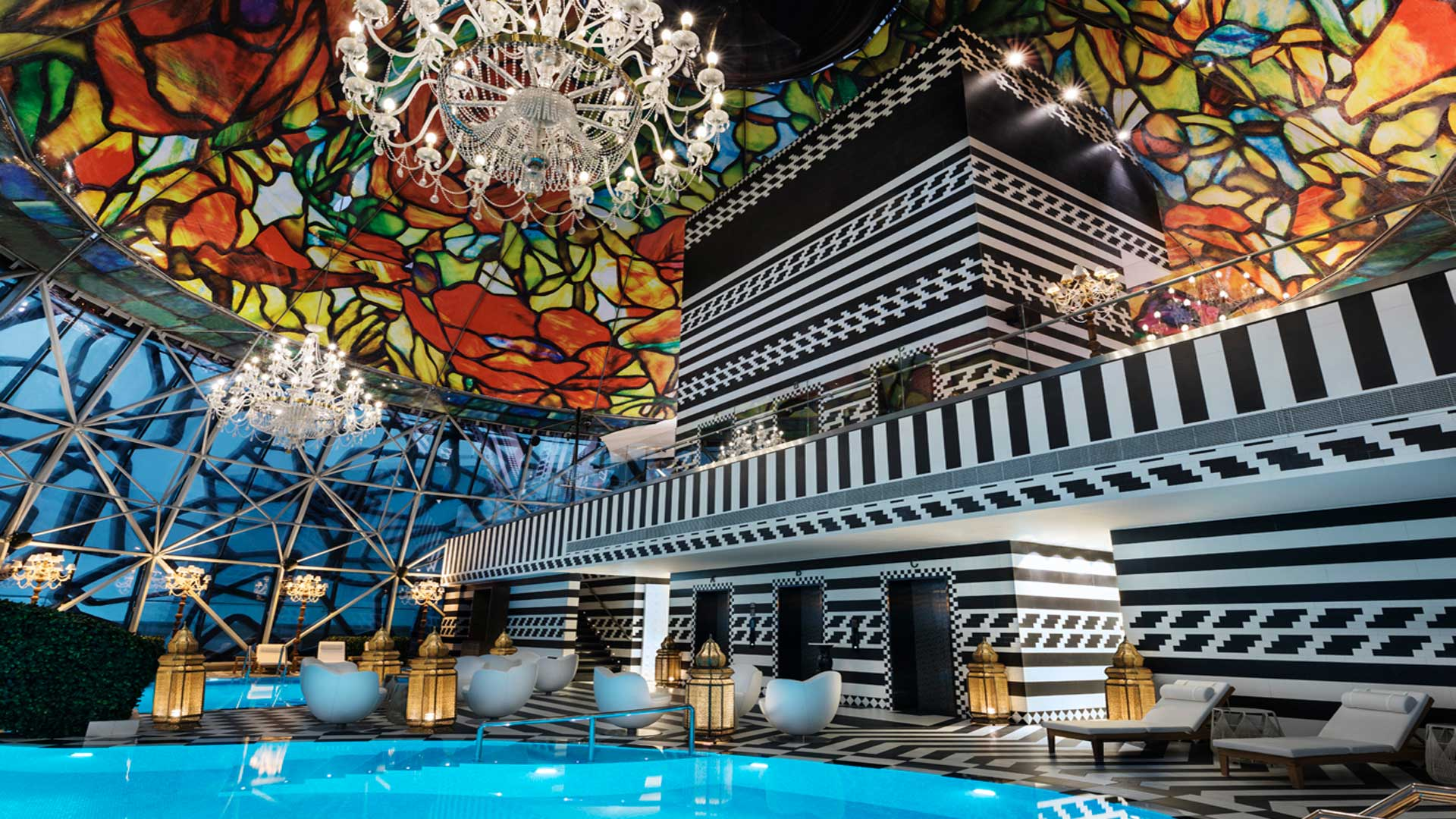
- Interactive map of the Mondrian Doha area
- Hotel chain: Ennismore Hotel Group

General information
- Status: Operating
- Type: Hotel
- Location: West Bay Lagoon, Doha, Qatar
- Coordinates: 25.37641°N 51.52328°E
- Opening: October 8, 2017; 8 years ago
- Owner: Ennismore

Design and construction
- Architect: South West Architecture

Other information
- Number of rooms: 270
- Number of restaurants: 8

Mondrian Doha is a hotel of the brand Mondrian at West Bay Lagoon, Doha in Qatar. It is part of the Ennismore lifestyle hotel chain . The hotel was opened in 2017. Its interior was designed by Marcel Wanders.
