= Mondrian Hong Kong =

Hotel in Tsim Sha Tsui, Hong Kong

Coordinates: 22.2977°N 114.1746°E

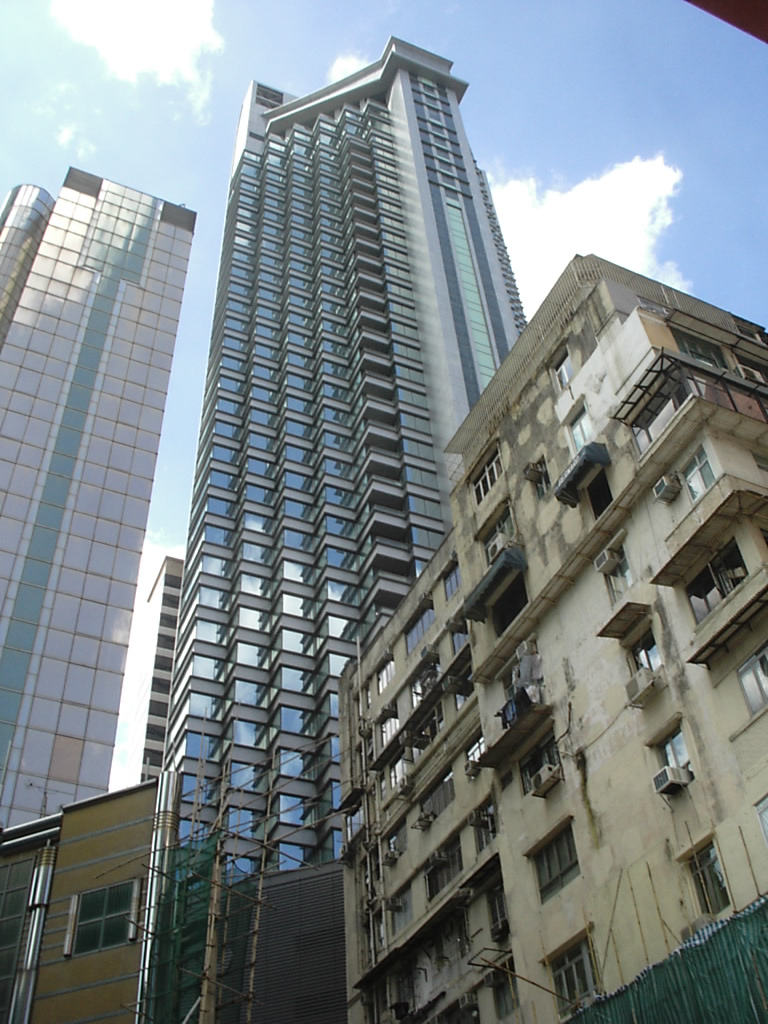
- View of the Hotel Panorama in 2007. Seen from the intersection of Hart Avenue and Mody Road.
- Interactive map of the Mondrian Hong Kong area
- Former names: Hotel Panorama (隆堡麗景酒店 "View from a Castle")
- Alternative names: 隆堡麗景酒店

General information
- Architectural style: Triangular-shaped
- Location: 8A Hart Avenue, Tsim Sha Tsui, Hong Kong

Technical details
- Floor count: 40

The Mondrian Hong Kong is a hotel of the brand Mondrian (operated by Accor Group) located at 8A Hart Avenue, near Chatham Road South, in Tsim Sha Tsui, Hong Kong, next to the high-rise hotel Hyatt Regency Hong Kong, Tsim Sha Tsui. It was formerly managed as Hotel Panorama by the Canadian Rhombus International Hotels Group, which also owns and manages LKF Hotel. The Hotel Panorama was eventually closed, and on December 18, 2023, re-opened as a Mondrian hotel.

== See also ==
- List of tallest buildings in Hong Kong
