= Mercure (hotel) =

International hotel brand

Mercure Hotels
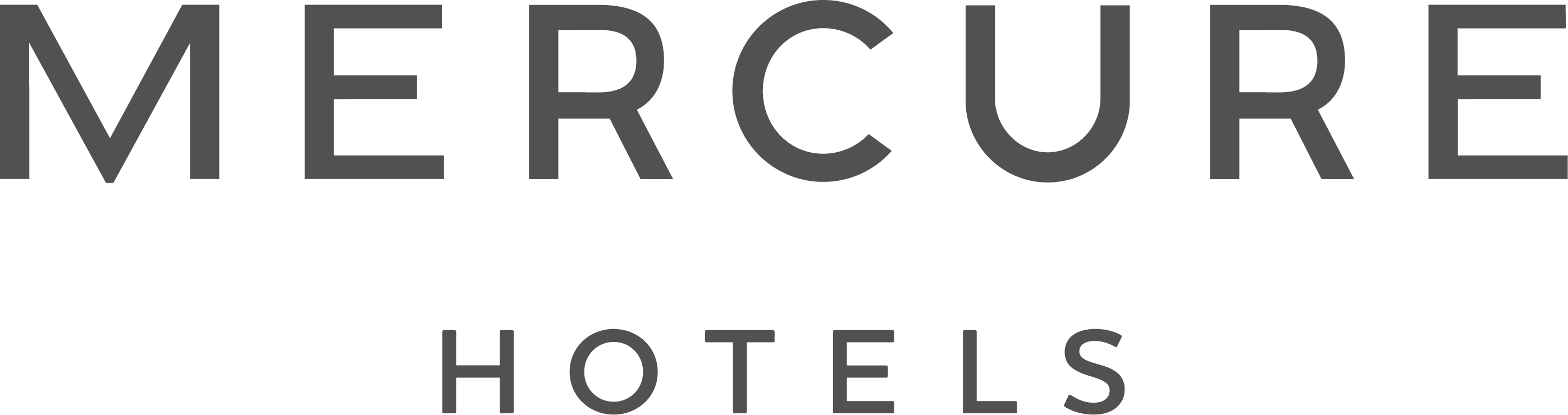
- Company type: Subsidiary
- Industry: Hospitality
- Founded: 1973; 53 years ago
- Founder: Gérard Pelisson; Paul Dubrule
- Headquarters: Issy les Moulineaux, France
- Number of locations: 899 (2021)
- Area served: 61 countries (2021)
- Parent: Accor
- Website: mercure.accor.com

Mercure is a French midscale hotel chain owned by Accor. Created in 1973 in France, the brand was acquired by Accor in 1975, and subsequently became a major part of the company's midscale hotel portfolio, alongside Novotel. As of 2021, Mercure operated 949 hotels in 63 countries. Outside Europe, Accor additionally uses the Grand Mercure brand, an upscale subsidiary in currently 12 countries.

== History ==
The former logo of Mercure Hotels which is still found on many properties.

=== Foundation and early years ===
The first Mercure hotel was established in 1973 in Saint-Witz, France. In 1975, Mercure was acquired by Accor (then Novotel-SIEH) and became Novotel's complementary midscale brand within the group.

In 1989, Mercure opened its 100th hotel. In 1991, following Accor's acquisition of the Compagnie Internationale des Wagons-Lits, the Altea hotels acquired through this deal became Mercure hotels. Several hotel brands purchased by Accor throughout the 1990s (Parthénon, Libertel, Jardins de Paris, Frantour, All Seasons) were also rebranded into Mercure hotels.

=== Development since 2000 ===
By 2001, 655 Mercure hotels were in operation worldwide. In 2007, following the launch of Accor's new brands MGallery, Pullman Hotels and Resorts and All Seasons, the group allocated several of its Mercure-branded locations to the development of those new brands.

In 2010, Mercure launched an expansive refurbishment program for its hotel rooms. In 2011, Accor signed a deal with Jupiter Hotels in the United Kingdom to rebrand 24 of their properties into Mercure hotels. In 2012, Mercure opened in China the first Grand Mercure branded Mei Jue for the Chinese market. In 2015, Mercure launched in Colombia and opened three Grand Mercure hotels in Brazil.

== Business figures ==
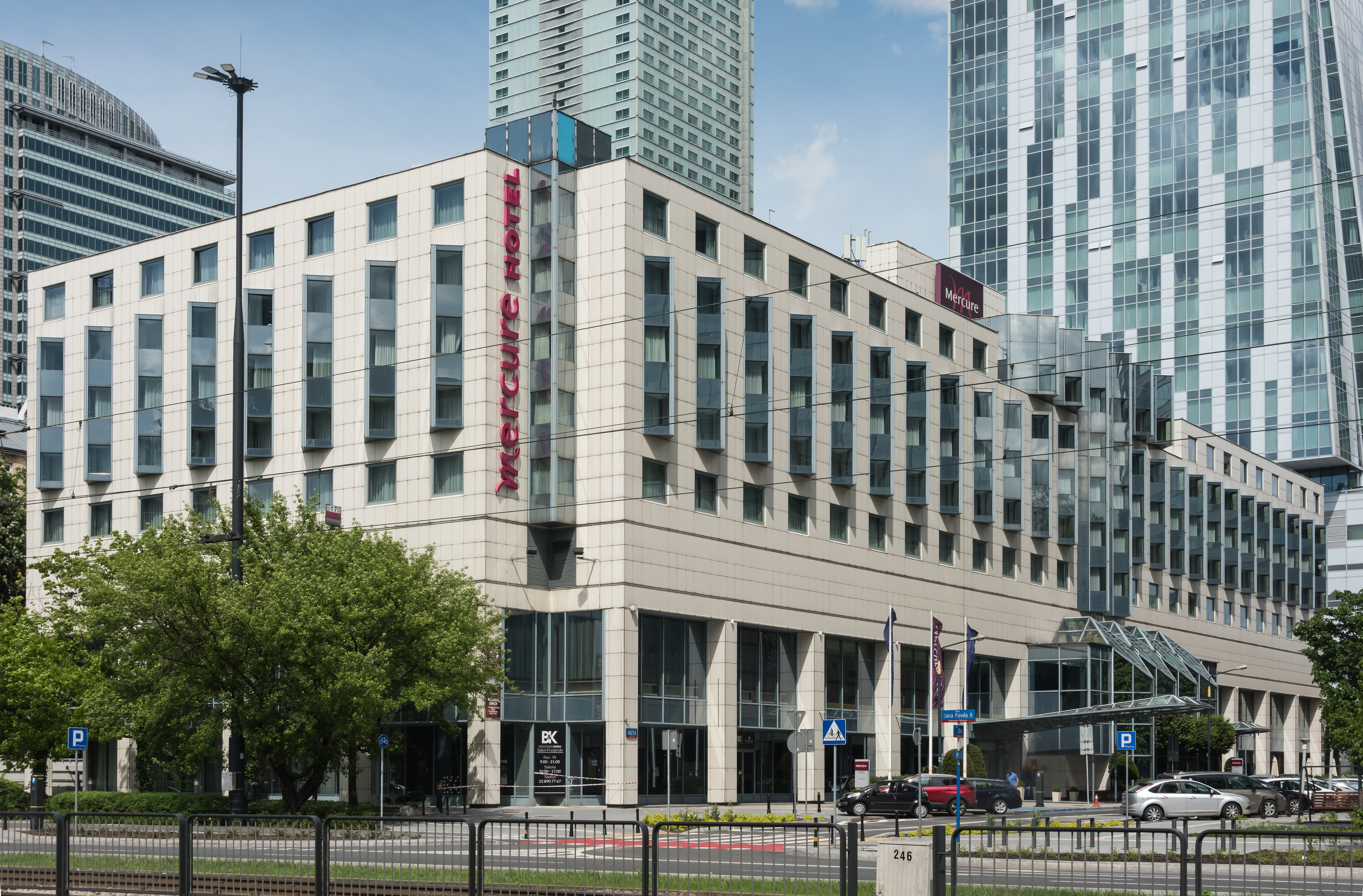
Mercure in Warsaw

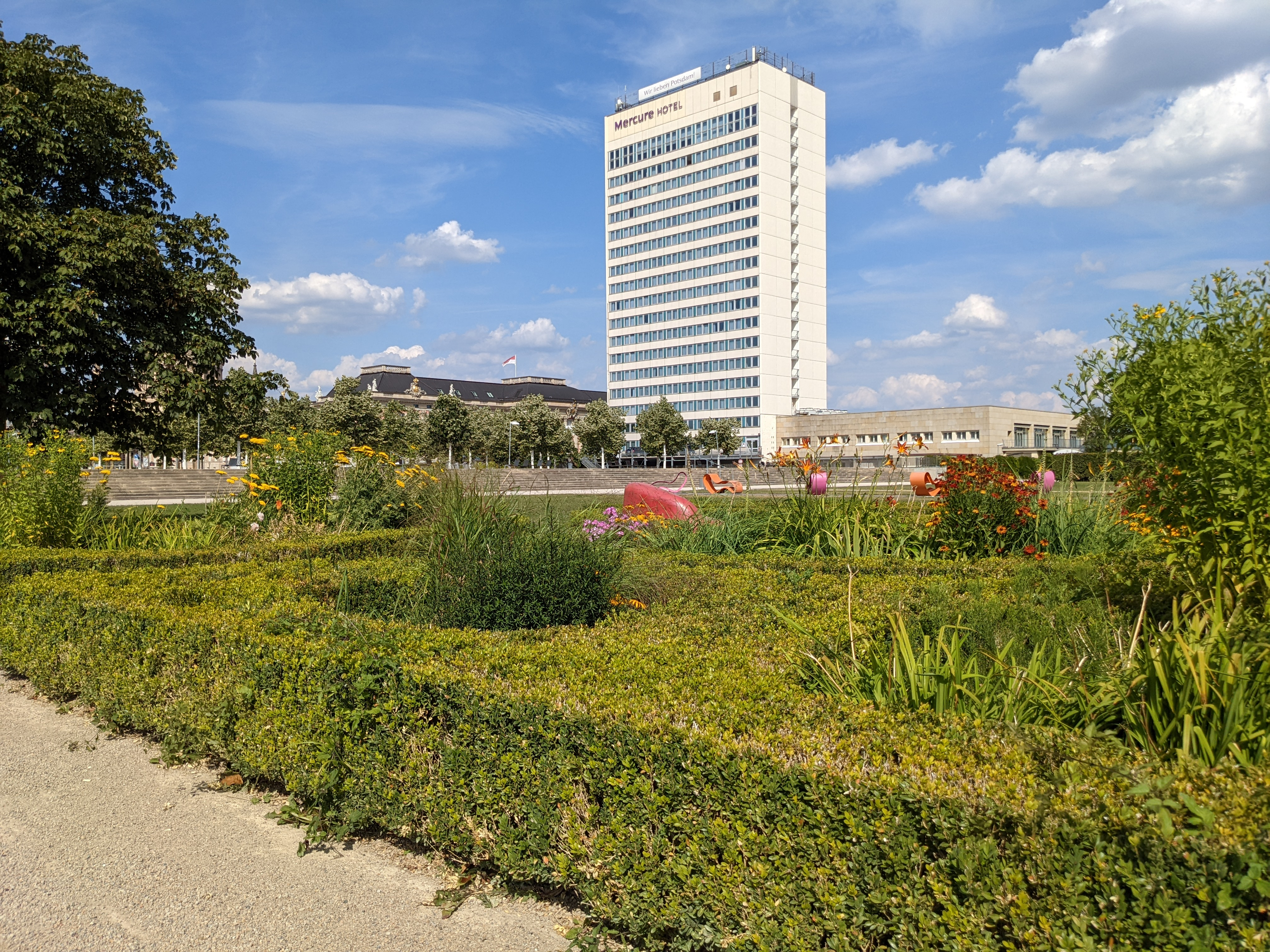
Mercure in Potsdam

Development since 2011
Year	Hotels	Rooms
2023	949	126,074
2022	904	119,591
2021	899	119,007
2020	875	114,926
2019	842	110,228
2018	810	104,969
2017	779	100,160
2016	747	95,894
2015	741	93,897
2014	711	89,203
2013	758	95,571
2012	804	99,853
2011	773	94,813

== See also ==
- Accor
- Novotel
