= HotelF1 =

French economy hotel brand

- Formerly: Formule 1
- Company type: Subsidiary
- Industry: Hotels
- Founded: 1984
- Headquarters: Évry, France
- Number of locations: 172 (2018)
- Area served: France
- Parent: Accor
- Website: hotelf1.accor.com

HotelF1, stylised as hotelF1 and branded Formule 1 until 2007, is a French budget hotel chain solely operating domestically. It its owned and had been created by Accor in 1984.

== History ==
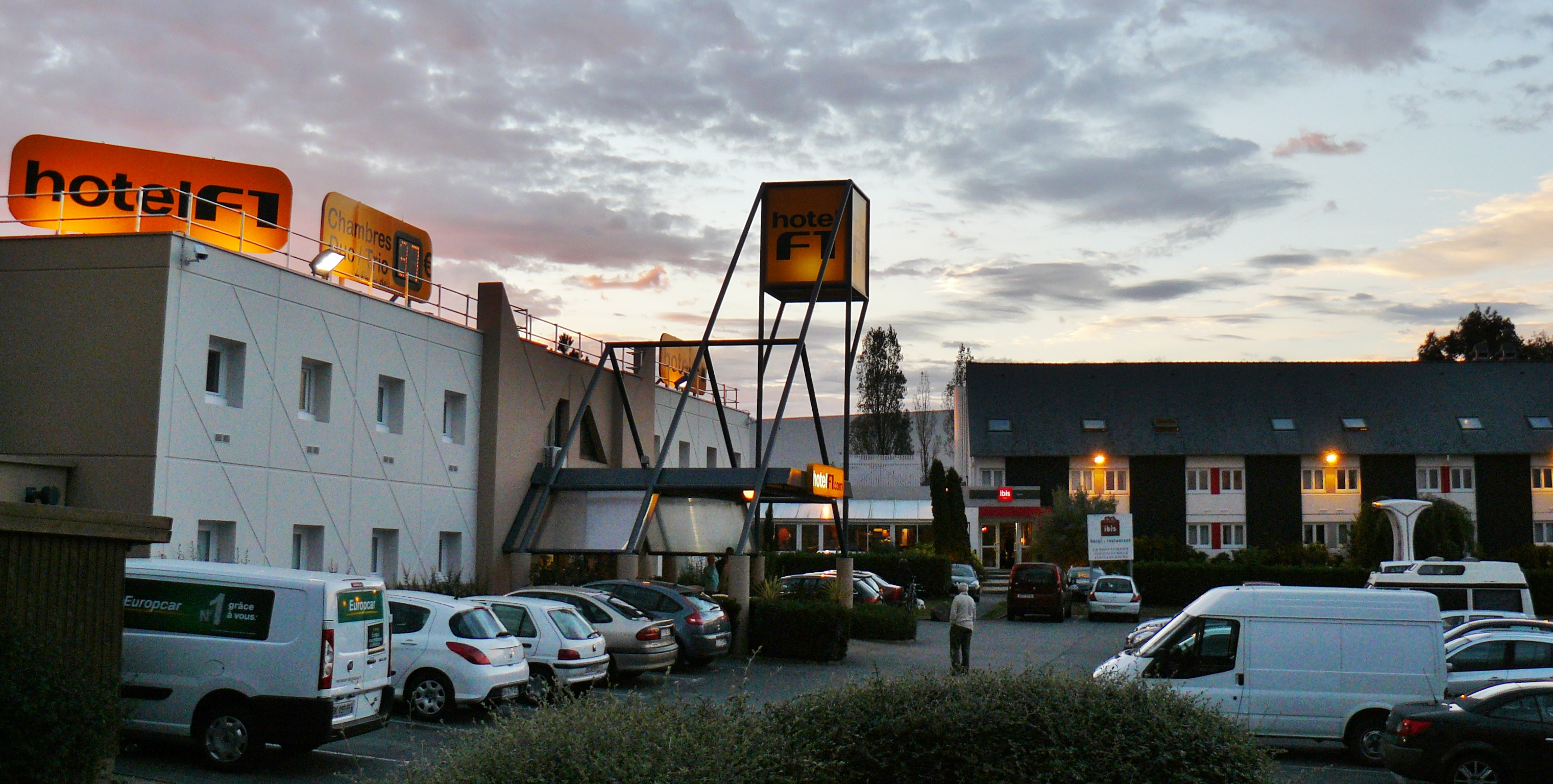
Hotel F1 in Vannes, next to a property of its sister company Ibis.

=== 1984: Formule 1 ===
After the launch of the Ibis brand positioned below the midscale Novotel, owner Accor reiterated its strategy in 1984 with the creation of Formule 1, an economy hotel brand positioned below its Ibis branded properties and that was opened its first location in 1985.

The construction process of Formule 1 hotels was completely industrialized and standardized, allowing Accor to open one location every week. In the early 1990s, the engineering techniques of Formule 1 inspired the group Accor to launch another economy brand, Etap Hôtel (now ibis budget). In the late 1990s, the construction techniques of Formule 1 were also adopted by Accor's other economy brand, Ibis. By 1997, Formule 1 occupied 39% of the "super-economy" hotel market in France. From 1985 to 2005, 100 million customers stayed in Formule 1 hotels.

=== 2007: HotelF1 ===
In 2007, Formule 1 was rebranded as HotelF1. In September 2009, Accor announced the sale of 158 HotelF1 hotels in a €272-million sale and management-back deal. In 2012, following a new hotel star-rating system in France, HotelF1 became a one-star hotel brand.

In 2017, Accor unveiled a rebranding and refurbishment for its HotelF1 chain. This included the introduction of optional shared rooms. As of 2018, HotelF1 managed 172 hotels in France.

== Development ==
Development since 2011
Year	Hotels	Rooms
2018	172	13 210
2017	170	12 975
2016	237	17 864
2015	237 (+ 8 Formule 1)	17 860 (+1 099 Formule 1)
2014	238 (+ 8 Formule 1)	17 906 (+ 930 Formule 1)
2013	238 (+ 10 Formule 1)	17 906 (+ 947 Formule 1)
2012	240 (+ 42 Formule 1)	18 037 (+ 3 039 Formule 1)
2011	243 (+ 85 Formule 1)	18 213 (+ 9 167 Formule 1)

== See also ==
- Ibis Budget
