= Hôtel Terminus =

Mercure Lyon Centre Château Perrache Hotel
- Hôtel Mercure Lyon Centre Château Perrache
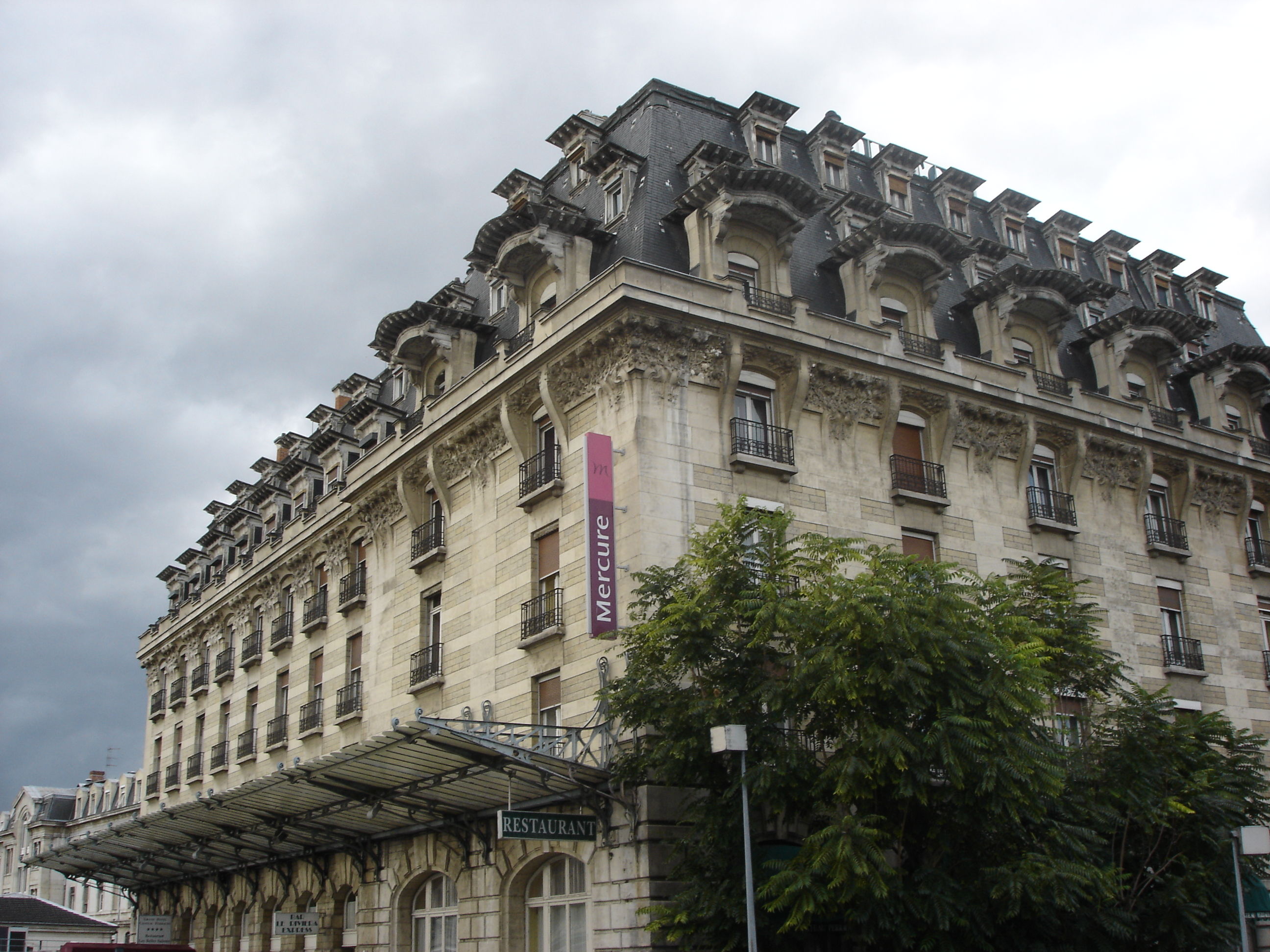
- View of the south side of the hotel
- Interactive map of the Mercure Lyon Centre Château Perrache Hotel area
- Former names: Hôtel Terminus

General information
- Type: hotel
- Location: 12 cours de Verdun, Lyon, France
- Coordinates: 45.7494°N 4.8247°E
- Construction started: 1905
- Completed: 1906
- Affiliation: Mercure

Design and construction
- Architect: Georges Chedanne

Other information
- Number of rooms: 120

Website
- www.accorhotels.com/gb/hotel-1292-mercure-lyon-centre-chateau-perrache-hotel/index.shtml

The Hôtel Mercure Lyon Centre Château Perrache, originally Hôtel Terminus, then Pullman Perrache, then Château Perrache, is a hotel of the AccorHotels group built in 1906. It is located on cours de Verdun in the 2nd arrondissement of Lyon. The hotel was the headquarters for the Gestapo in Lyon during the Second World War.

== History ==
=== Construction ===
In 1902, the Compagnie des chemins de fer de Paris à Lyon et à la Méditerranée (PLM) decided to build a hotel near the gare de Lyon-Perrache. The hotel was built on the site of the former brasserie Rinck. Architect Georges Chedanne was chosen to oversee the construction. He was assisted by a Lyonnais architect, M. Curieux. Construction completed in 1906. The palace hotel's interior was done in the Art Nouveau style, designed by artists including the painters Henri Martin and Ernest Laurent and the sculptor Edgar-Henri Boutry. Cabinetmaker Louis Majorelle designed the canopies at the north and south entrances of the hotel and did the paneling in the lounges. Several sound-proofing techniques were used in the construction, including using cork and double layers of bricks in the rooms and hallways.

=== Second World War ===
During the Second World War, in 1942 and 1943, the hotel became the headquarters of the Gestapo in Lyon. Notably, it housed department IV led by Klaus Barbie, who was in charge of eliminating the resistance. The film Hôtel Terminus: The Life and Times of Klaus Barbie by Marcel Ophüls details the role of Barbie in Lyon.

=== Second part of the 20th century ===
The property was renovated in 1959. Portions of the hotel, including the ceiling of the dining room, were destroyed.

In 1982, SNCF, owner since the incorporation of the PLM, transferred the hotel to the Frantour chain. After the opening of the gare de Lyon-Part-Dieu in 1983, the hotel saw a decrease in clientele. The construction of the Centre d'échanges de Perrache in the 1970s resulted in the hotel becoming situated between a highway and the railway line, thus damaging its image.

The "groupe Société des Hôtels de Bourgogne" bought the hotel in August 1986 and restored it from 1987 to 1989. In October 1989, the Hôtel Terminus became part of the Pullman chain and was renamed accordingly "Pullman Perrache". It was then renamed "Hôtel Château Perrache" when it was acquired by Mercure.

== Historic monument designation ==
The hotel was classified as a historic monument on 24 November 1997. It was labeled "Patrimoine du XXe siècle" of Lyon in 2003.

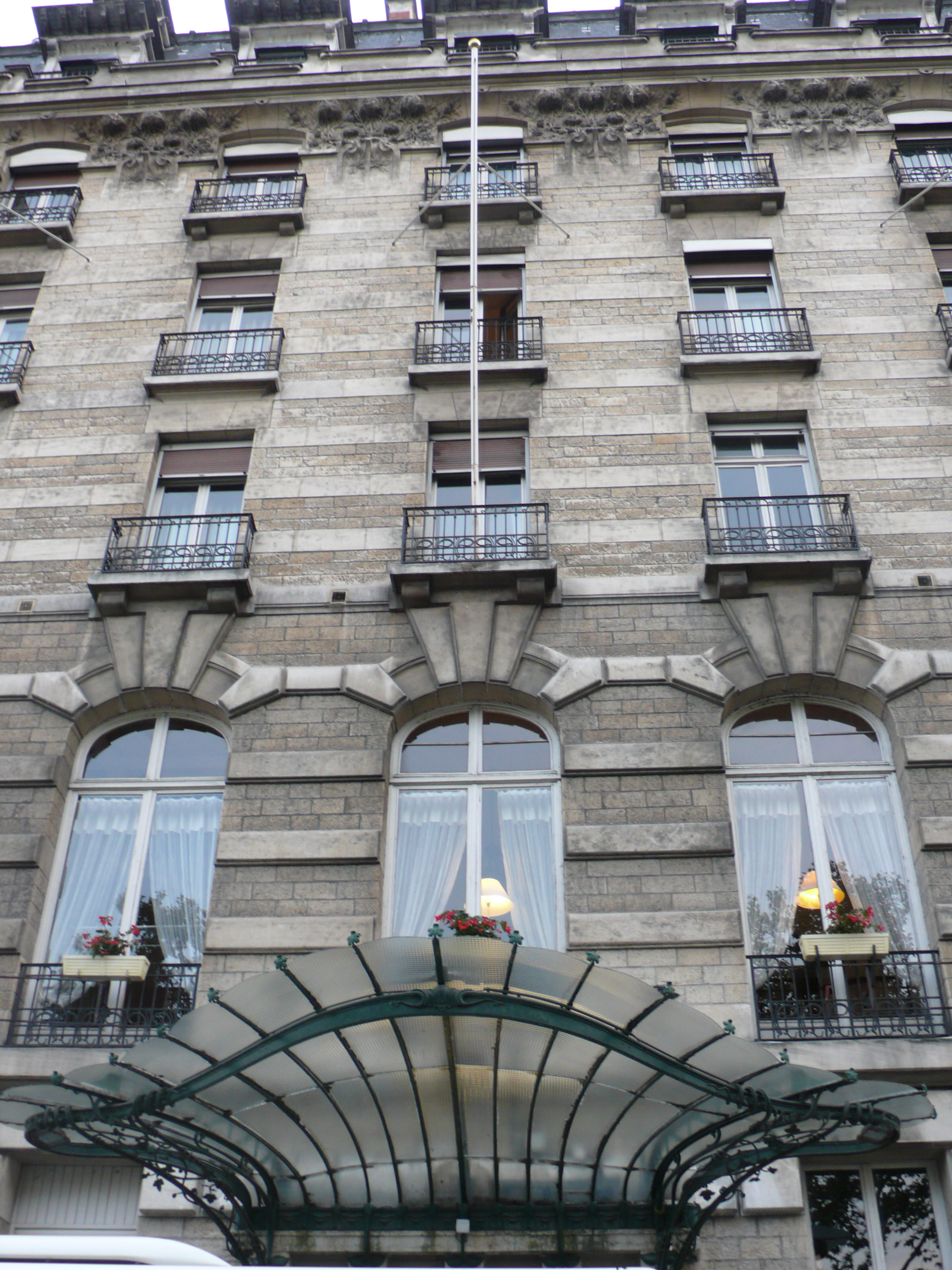
Canopy at the north side of the hotel (cours de Verdun)

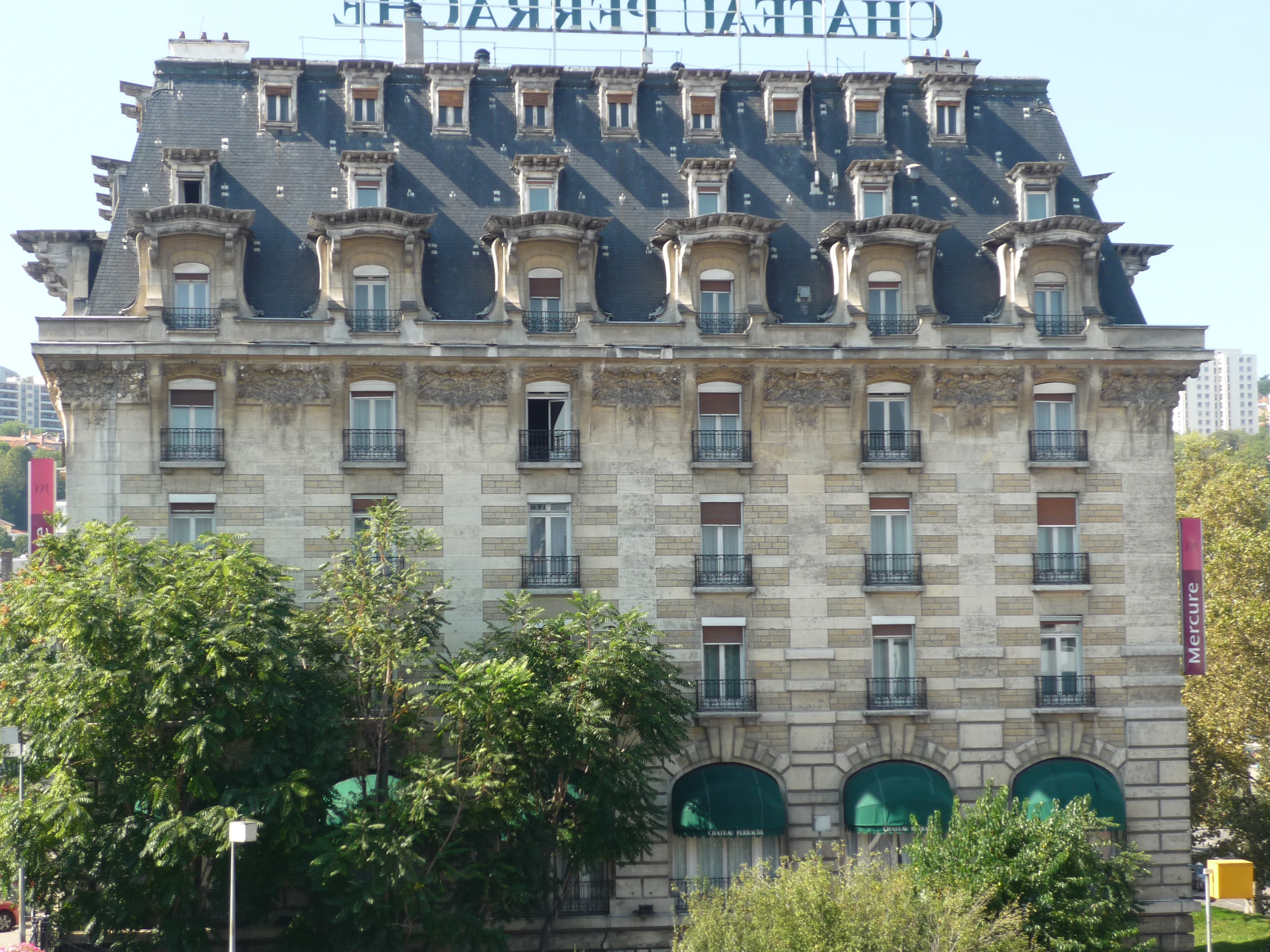
East facade

== See also ==
- Montluc prison
