= UFE =

UFE can stand for:

- Uniform Evaluation, Canadian accountancy exam (now Common Final Examination)
- United for a Fair Economy, an American non-profit
- Uterine fibroid embolization, a medical procedure
- French University of Egypt (French: Université française d'Égypte), Cairo
- Unidentified flag or ensign, in vexillology
- Union des Français de l'Étranger, a French organisation
