= Novotel Suites =

Hotel brand owned by the Accor Group

- Company type: Subsidiary
- Industry: Hotels
- Number of locations: 30+
- Area served: Europe, Asia & Middle East
- Parent: Accor
- Website: novotel.accor.com

Novotel Suites, formerly branded as Suite Novotel, is a chain of 4-star hotels owned by the Accor Group. It was conceived as an apartment hotel expansion of its sister brand Novotel, one of the chain's main midscale hotel brands.

== Features ==
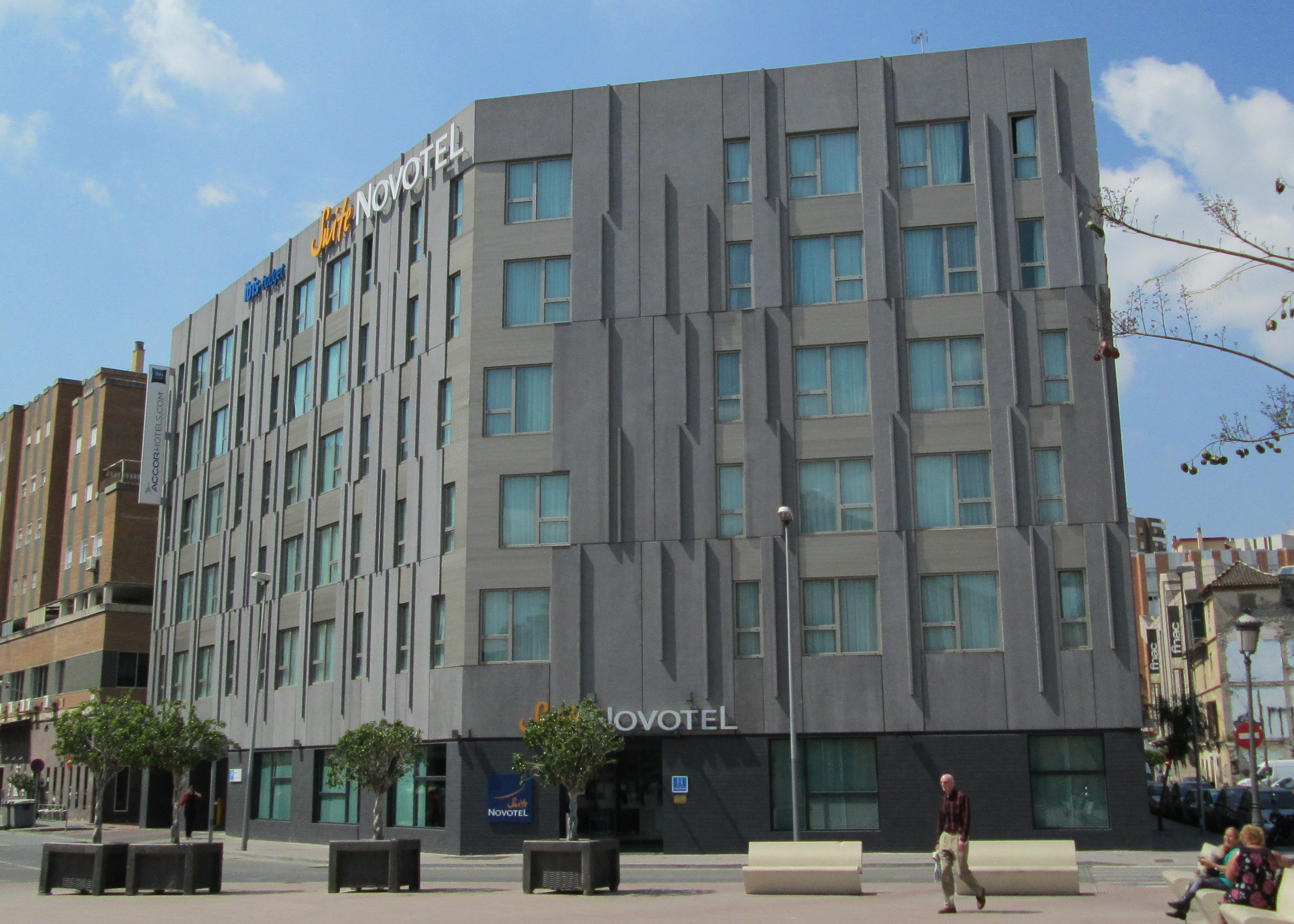
Novotel Suites in Málaga, wearing the older Suite Novotel branding.

The rooms usually hold up to four people and contain a sofa, a large TV with cable and international channels, a large bed with option to roll out a single bed from underneath, a large desk, a microwave, a refrigerator, a bathroom with bath and shower, and a separate toilet. The hotel also has wireless internet access in every room. Communal facilities include an "ironing room", a gym, a breakfast area, a bar, a computer in reception with internet access as well as a "Boutique Gourmande" (vending machines) providing food and drink at all hours.

== Properties ==
As of 2024, Novotel Suites maintains hotels at 32 locations in Europe with a focus on France, Asia and the Middle East.

Europe

Europe
No.	Name	Location	Country
1	Novotel Suites Berlin City Potsdamer Platz	Berlin	Germany
2	Novotel Suites Cannes Centre	Cannes	France
3	Novotel Suites Clermont Ferrand Polydome	Clermont-Ferrand	France
4	Novotel Suites Colmar Centre	Colmar	France
5	Novotel Suites Gare Lille Europe	Lille	France
6	Novotel Suites Genève Aéroport	Geneva	Switzerland
7	Novotel Suites Hannover City	Hanover	Germany
8	Novotel Suites Luxembourg	Luxembourg City	Luxembourg
9	Novotel Suites Malaga Centro	Málaga	Spain
10	Novotel Suites Marseille Centre Euromed	Marseille	France
11	Novotel Suites Montpellier	Montpellier	France
12	Novotel Suites Munich Parkstadt Schwabing	Munich	Germany
13	Novotel Suites Nancy Centre	Nancy	France
14	Novotel Suites Nice Airport	Nice	France
15	Novotel Suites Paris CDG Airport Villepinte	Roissy-en-France	France
16	Novotel Suites Paris Expo Porte de Versailles	Paris	France
17	Novotel Suites Paris Issy les Moulineaux	Issy-les-Moulineaux	France
18	Novotel Suites Paris Montreuil Vincennes	Paris	France
19	Novotel Suites Paris Stade de France	Saint-Denis	France
20	Novotel Suites Perpignan Centre	Perpignan	France
21	Novotel Suites Reims Centre	Reims	France
22	Novotel Suites Rouen Normandie	Rouen	France
23	Novotel Suites Wien City Donau	Vienna	Austria

Asia

Asia
No.	Name	Location	Country
1	Novotel Suites Bangkok Sukhumvit 34	Bangkok	Thailand
2	Novotel Suites Bangkok Sukhumvit 39	Bangkok	Thailand
3	Novotel Suites Dubai Mall of the Emirates	Dubai	United Arab Emirates
4	Novotel Suites Hanoi	Hanoi	Vietnam
5	Novotel Suites Manila at Acqua	Mandaluyong	Philippines
6	Novotel Suites Riyadh Centre	Riyadh	Saudi Arabia
7	Novotel Suites Riyadh Olaya	Riyadh	Saudi Arabia
8	Novotel Suites Shanghai Hongqiao	Shanghai	China
9	Novotel Suites Yogyakarta Malioboro	Yogyakarta	Indonesia
