= Redha Medjellekh =

Choreographer and filmmaker

Redha Medjellekh is a choreographer and filmmaker, who has created over 40 films in the form of viral videos, documentaries, short films, and ad campaigns.

His recent entrepreneurial projects, including his company, Red is Dancing, have attracted over 120 million video views and 128 thousand followers in the past year.

== Viral video production ==
Redha founded Red is Dancing in 2015, a creative agency specializing in dance. Based in Paris and New York City Red is Dancing has a varied roster of clients, including: Alvin Ailey American Dance Theater, Red Bull Dance, Credo Beauty, Ibis Hotel, The Voice France, Universal Music, Gaumont and Target. The company has also created collaborations with renowned institutions like the Brooklyn Museum, The Wythe Hotel in Williamsburg, Brooklyn and Redha's artist residency 836M based in San Francisco.

In 2016, Redha's video response to the Paris terror attacks "Paris is Kissing", received features and shares across platforms, and around the world. A year later, Redha's video "Am I Paris", featuring renowned dancer Skorpion, received a Vimeo Staff pick of the month.

Even when working with corporate clients, Redha's videos always strive to have strong storylines and social commentary, uplifted his mission of "Dance no Matter What".
