= Gilles Pélisson =

French business executive (born 1957)

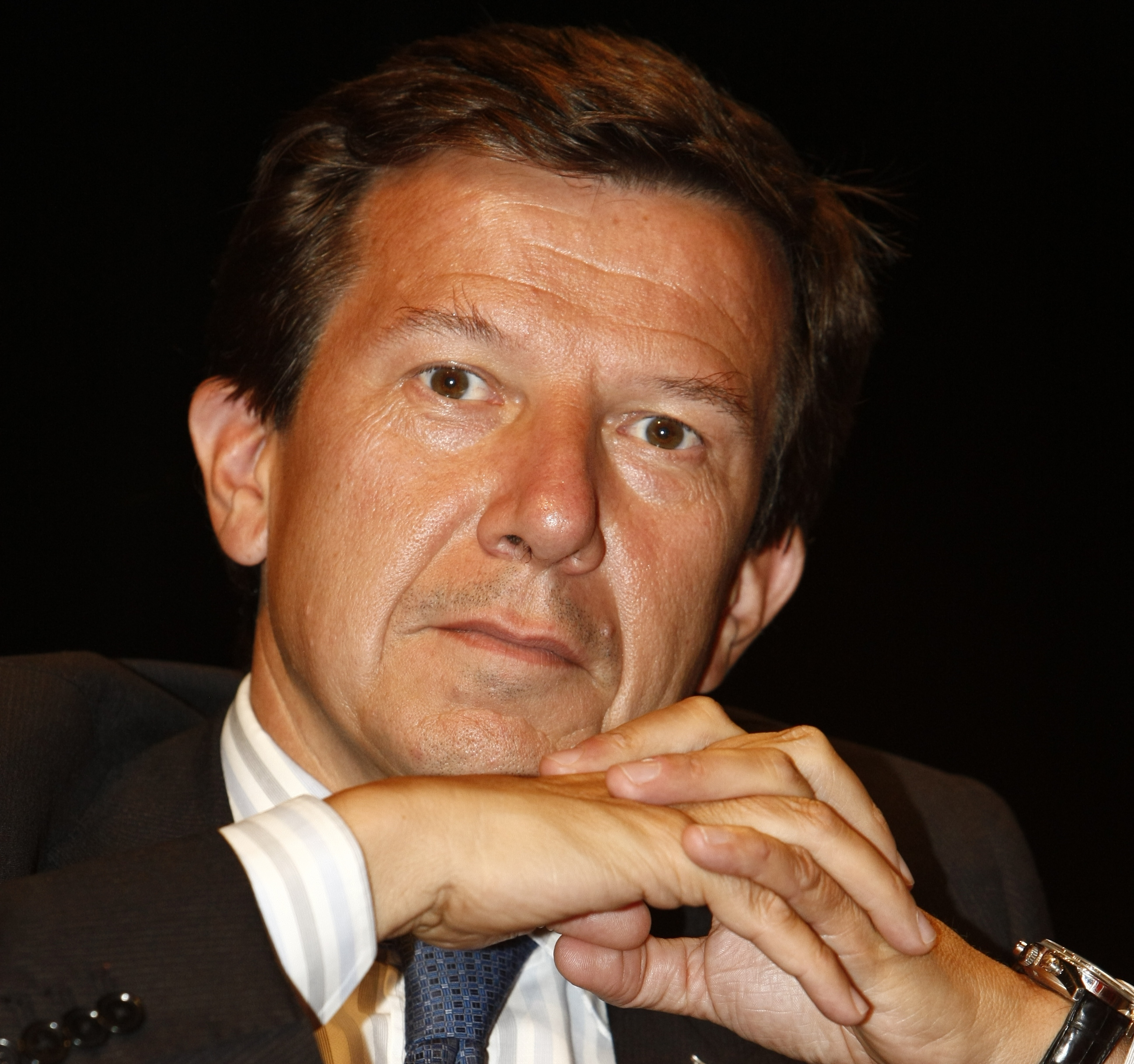
- Born: 26 May 1957 (age 68); Lyon, France
- Education: Lycée du Parc
- Alma mater: ESSEC Business School; Harvard Business School
- Occupation: President of TF1
- Family: Gérard Pelisson (uncle)

Gilles Pélisson (born 26 May 1957) is a French business executive.

== Early life ==
Gilles Pélisson was born on 26 May 1957. His uncle, Gérard Pelisson, was the founder of the Accor hotel group.

He graduated from the ESSEC Business School in Paris. He went on to receive an MBA from the Harvard Business School.

== Career ==
Pélisson started his career for Accor in Los Angeles, California. He served as the chief executive officer of the French restaurant chain Courtepaille from 1988 to 1993. He then served as the joint chairman of the Novotel hotel chain. He then served as the vice-chief executive officer of Euro Disney from 1993 to 1997, and as its chief executive officer from 1997 to 2000.

Pélisson was the chairman of the Suez-Telefónica ST3G consortium and chairman of NOOS, a French cable network operator, from 2000 to 2001. He was the chief operating officer of Bouygues Télécom from 2001 to 2004, and as its chief executive officer from 2004 to 2006. He was the CEO of Accor from 2006 to 2010, and as its chairman from 2009 to 2011.

He is on the board of directors of Accenture.

== Other activities ==
Pélisson was on the board of trustees of the MEDEF. He is a co-founder and the president of the Fondation ESSEC, the fundraising organisation of his alma mater, ESSEC.

Media offices
Preceded by Nonce Paolini	President of TF1; 2016–present	Succeeded by Incumbent
