= Sébastien Bazin =

French businessman

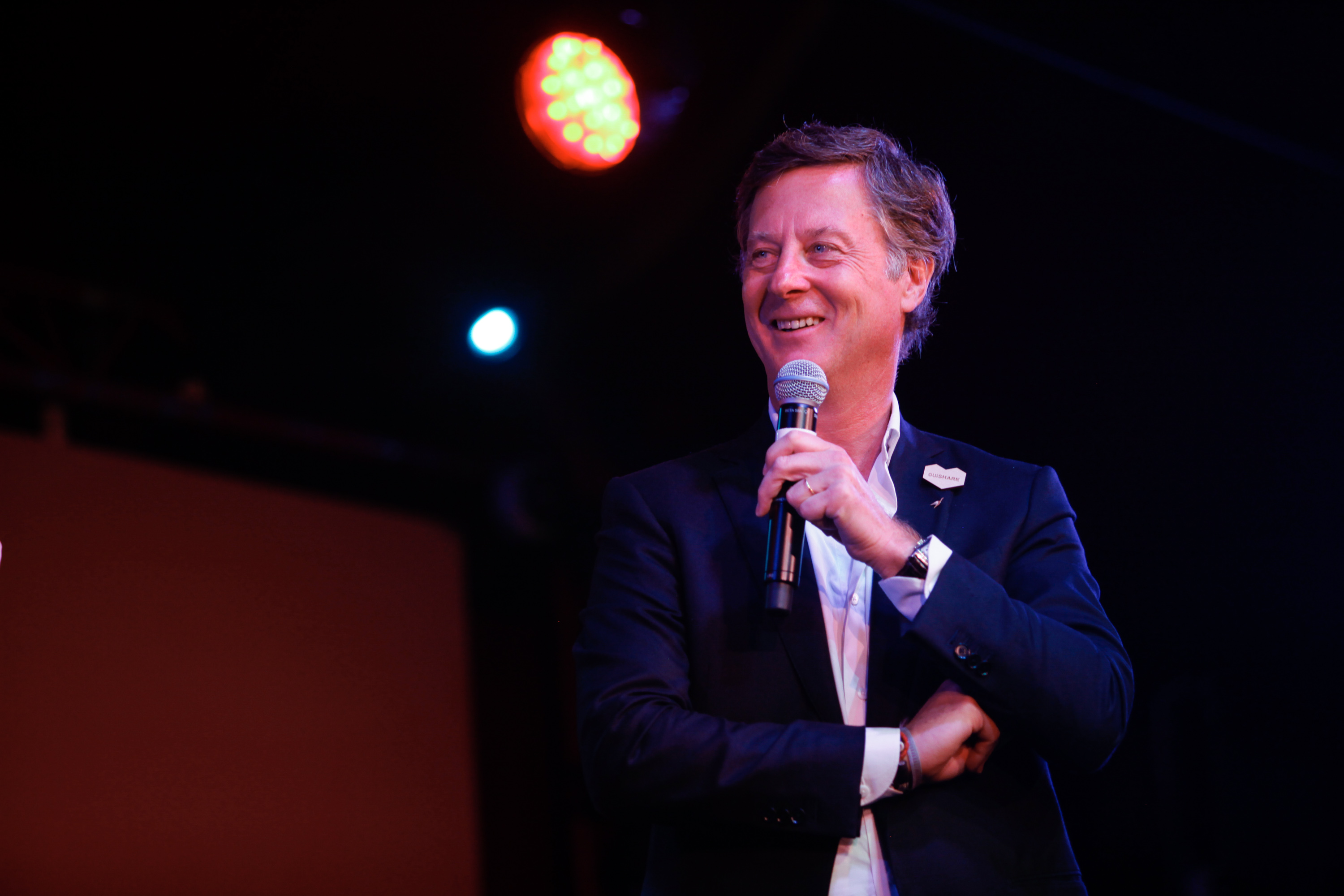
- Born: 9 November 1961 (age 64); Boulogne-Billancourt, Paris, France
- Education: Paris-Sorbonne University
- Occupation: CEO of AccorHotels

Sébastien Bazin (born 9 November 1961) is a French businessman. He is the chairman and chief executive officer of AccorHotels (Euronext: AC; LSE: 0H59). As CEO of Accor, he has committed to the UN's HeForShe campaign that seeks to promote women's and men's rights by pledging to reach parity in pay and equality between genders by 2020.

== Early life ==
Bazin was born on 9 November 1961. He studied at Saint-Jean de Passy, holds a degree in economics obtained in 1984 and a master's degree in management, finance option, obtained at the Pantheon-Sorbonne University in 1985. During his military service, he served as a firefighter in Paris.

== Career ==
Bazin began his career in finance in the United States, Clore then Paine Webber groups in New York City, San Francisco, then went to London. He returned to France and became the Director of Investment Banking Hottinguer Rivaud Finances from 1990 to 1992. He continued his career by becoming Managing Director of the company Immobilière Hôtelière in 1992. He held this position for five years.

In 1997, he began to serve as managing director of Europe at Colony Capital, a global real estate investment company. He served on the board of directors of Hottinguer Rivaud Finances, an investment bank. He also served on the board of Edenred from 2010 to 2013.

In 2006, Bazin became one of the shareholders of Paris Saint-Germain (PSG), via Colony Capital. On 3, he became the 14th president of PSG, following the departure of Charles Villeneuve. Since July 2011 and the acquisition of PSG by a Qatar investment fund, he is no longer majority shareholder.

Since August 2013, he has been chairman of the board and chief executive officer of Accor, a global hotel corporation.

In November 2017, at the 4th Challenges magazine's Economic Summit, Bazin announced the preparation of a strategic alliance with one of the giants of the net-economy to accelerate the dematerialization and the digital transformation of the Accor group.

== Personal life ==
Bazin is married and has four children. In 1993, his three-year-old daughter was among the 21 children taken hostage at their nursery school in Neuilly-sur-Seine, a suburb of Paris.

Business positions
Preceded by Denis Hennequin	CEO of AccorHotels; 2013–present	Succeeded by Incumbent
