= Thalassa Sea & Spa =

- Industry: Hotels
- Founded: 2011
- Headquarters: Évry, France
- Number of locations: 13 (2018)
- Area served: France
- Parent: Accor
- Website: thalassa.com

Thalassa Sea & Spa is the thalassotherapy brand of the group Accor. In 1984, Accor purchased the Quiberon institute, the first of the Thalassa brand, and the largest thalassotherapy center in France to this day. Thalassa Sea & Spa has 9 centers in France and 4 abroad (Italy, Morocco, Bahrain).

== History ==
=== 1984: Acquisition of Quiberon ===
In 1984, Accor bought the thalassotherapy center of Quiberon in Brittany, Western France, which became the first of the Thalassa brand and its flagship center.

By 1999, Thalassa operated 10 locations, and started to diversify in spa centers, fitness, beauty and health services. All Thalassa centers are linked to a hotel brand of the Accor group. In 2001, Thalassa opened its first location outside of France, in Vilalara, Portugal, followed by Essaouira in Morocco.

In 2005, a "Le Spa by Accor Thalassa" was planned to open in the Los Angeles Sofitel. Le Spa by Accor Thalassa was a partnership between Accor and Lancôme, which later led to the creation of the So Spa by Sofitel.

=== 2010: Restructuration ===
In 2010, All 11 Thalassa centers became Thalassa Sea & Spa. A 25-million euros budget went to upgrade the Quiberon center.

In 2012, Thalassa Sea & Spa opened the first thalassotherapy spa in the Middle East, in Bahrain. In 2015, the diet cuisine of the Thalassa Quiberon chef was added on the menus of Sofitel hotels. In 2017, Sofitel announced the construction of its largest hotel in the Middle East, which integrated a Thalassa Sea & Spa.

In January 2019, Thalassa Sea & Spa repackaged its global offer and introduced a new logo.

== Locations ==
| Country | Center | Hotel |
|---|---|---|
| France | Oléron | Novotel |
| France | Quiberon | Sofitel, ibis |
| France | Biarritz Le Miramar | Sofitel |
| France | Dinard | Novotel |
| France | Trouville Cures Marines | MGallery |
| France | Le Touquet | Novotel, ibis |
| France | Fréjus | Mercure |
| France | Golfe d'Ajaccio | Sofitel |
| France | Hyères | ibis |
| Italy | Timi Ama Sardegna | Pullman |
| Morocco | Agadir | Sofitel |
| Morocco | Essaouira | MGallery |
| Bahrain | Zallaq | Sofitel |
