= Jo&Joe =

Hotel chain brand owned by Accor

- Company type: Subsidiary
- Industry: Hospitality
- Founded: 2016
- Headquarters: Évry, France
- Number of locations: 6 (2024)
- Area served: France, Italy, Austria, Brazil
- Owner: Accor
- Website: joandjoe.com

Jo&Joe is a French hotel chain owned by Accor. It currently manages six hotels in Europe and South America.

== History ==
In September 2016, Accor announced the establishment of a new brand with 50 openings projected by 2020. The first location opened in March 2017 in Hossegor, France. The property was designed in partnership with Quiksilver and Roxy.

In 2018, Accor announced to open a hotel at the Largo do Boticário architectural complex in Rio de Janeiro, Brazil, and its first location in Paris. This was followed by the announcement of properties in London, along with openings in Dubai, Thailand, Vienna, and a second location in Paris.

== See also ==
- Accor
