= Ibis Budget =

French brand of economy hotels

- Formerly: Etap Hôtel
- Type: Subsidiary
- Industry: Hospitality
- Founded: 2011
- Headquarters: Évry, France
- Number of locations: 592 (December 2025)
- Area served: Worldwide
- Products: Hotels
- Parent: Accor
- Website: Official website

Ibis Budget (stylised ibis budget) is a French budget hotel brand owned by Accor, which also owns the Ibis and Ibis Styles brands. It is an economy hotel brand specialising in essential comfort at a budget price. Created in 1992 in France under the name Etap Hôtel, the brand was renamed Ibis Budget in 2011. As of 31 December 2025, Ibis Budget managed 592 hotels with 63,722 rooms worldwide.

== History ==
=== 1992: Etap Hôtel ===
After the successful launch of the budget hotel chain Formule 1 in 1985, the group Accor launched a new economy brand, Etap Hôtel, in 1992. By 2004, 229 Etap Hôtel locations opened in France, and 81 elsewhere in Europe. To fine-tune its economy segment, the Accor group privileged the development of Etap Hôtel over its other budget brand Formule 1.

In 2008, the chain had been awarded Best Interior Design by the European Hotel Design Awards.

=== 2011: Ibis Budget ===
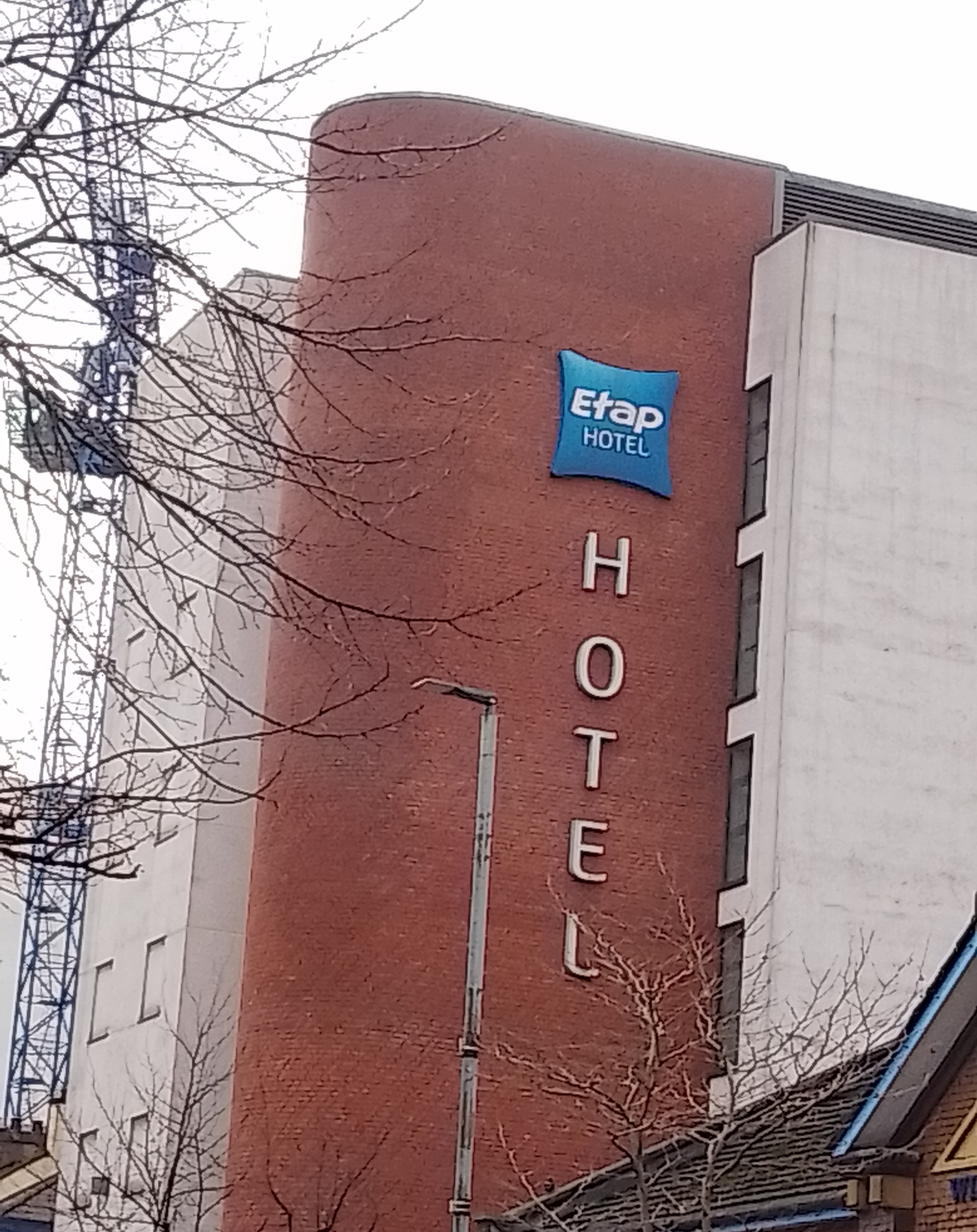
The Etap hotel in Belfast in February 2024

In September 2011, Accor rebranded Etap Hôtel into Ibis Budget and All Seasons into ibis Styles, turning ibis into the group's economy megabrand. The "Sweet Bed" was rolled out throughout the ibis brands, the first bed entirely designed by a hotel group. The mattresses, pillows and digital access were upgraded. The lobby was turned into a living space. Following this restructure, the ibis megabrand became the leading hotel operator in Europe in 2013 with 1,277 hotels. The first Ibis Budget opened in Tangier, Morocco, in November 2011.

In 2013, Ibis Budget became Spain's first super-economy hotel chain with 15 hotels in the country. The following year, still in Spain, Ibis Budget tested the installation of solar thermal collectors capable of yielding power on rainy days and during the night.

In April 2017, Ibis Budget introduced the new Nest rooms which include a pull-down bed. In January 2019, ibis Budget launched a discount offer for rainy days. In October 2019, Ibis Budget launched in Singapore.

The last remaining hotel with the old Etap name was located in Belfast; however, this officially rebranded as Ibis Budget on 1st December 2024. The property in which the business operates, under Essendi (formally known as AccorInvest), was sold to Andras House in March 2024.

== Development ==
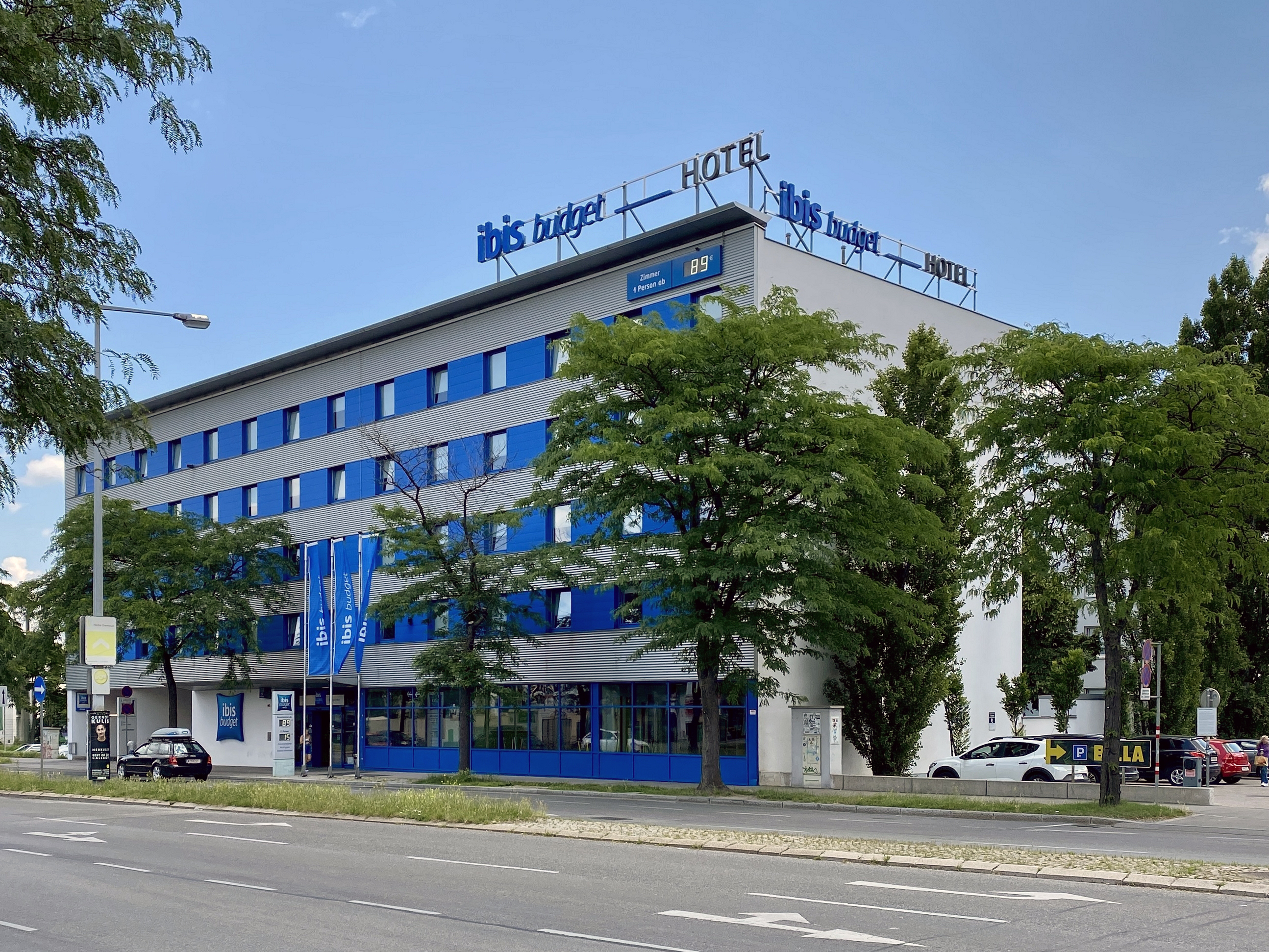
Ibis Budget in Vienna

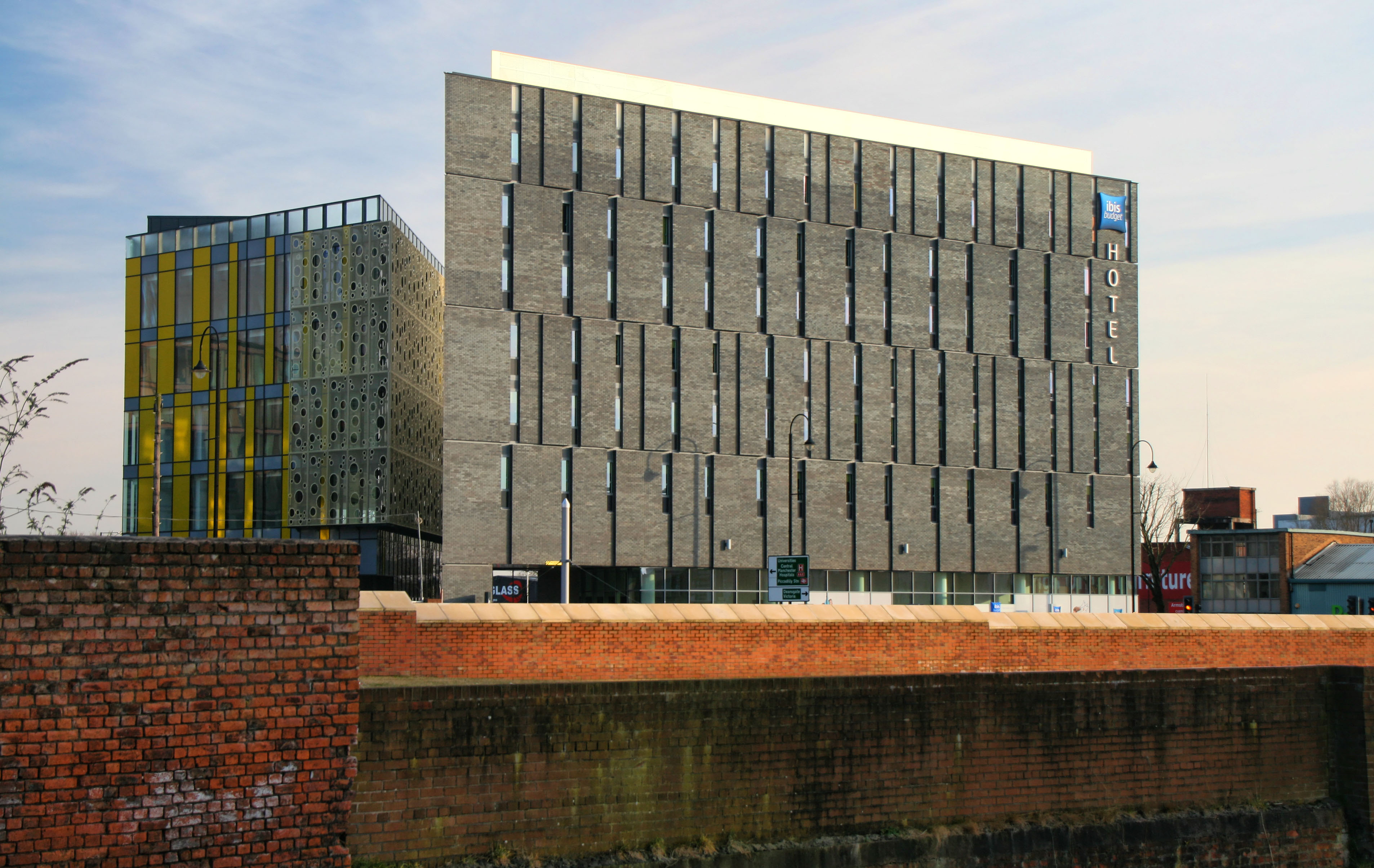
Ibis Budget in Manchester

Development since 2011
Year	Hotels	Rooms
2025	592	63,722
2021	656	65,648
2020	639	64,074
2019	636	63,783
2018	614	61,226
2017	588	58,096
2016	570	55,516
2015	551	52,699
2014	537	51,022
2013	506	46,547
2012	492	44,954
2011	437	37,297

== See also ==
- Accor
- ibis
- ibis Styles
