= Accor =

French multinational hospitality company

Accor S.A.
- Type: Public
- Traded as: Euronext Paris: AC; LSE: 0H59; FWB: ACR; FWB: ACR1 (ADR); CAC 40 component
- ISIN: FR0000120404
- Industry: Hospitality
- Founded: 1967; 59 years ago Paris, France
- Founders: Gérard Pelisson; Paul Dubrule
- Headquarters: Tour Sequana, Issy-les-Moulineaux, France
- Number of locations: 5,700 (end 2025)
- Area served: Worldwide
- Key people: Sébastien Bazin (Chairman and CEO)
- Brands: Luxury: Orient Express; Raffles Hotels and Resorts; Faena; Banyan Tree Hotels and Resorts; Sofitel Legend; Fairmont Hotels and Resorts; Sofitel; MGallery; Emblems; Premium: Mantis; Art Series; Pullman; Swissôtel; Mövenpick; Grand Mercure; Peppers; The Sebel; Midscale: Mantra; Novotel; Mercure; Aparthotel Adagio; Handwritten Collection; Tribe; Economy: BreakFree; ibis; ibis Styles; ibis budget; hotelF1; greet; Ennismore: 21c Museum Hotels; 25 Hours; Delano; Gleneagles; Hyde; Jo&Joe; Mama Shelter; Mondrian; Morgans Originals; SLS; SO/; The Hoxton; working from_; Rixos; Our Habitas; Rikas
- Revenue: ▲€5.63 billion (2025)
- Operating income: ▲€807 million (2025)
- Net income: ▼€449 million (2025)
- Total assets: €12.1 billion (2024)
- Total equity: €5.5 billion (2024)
- Number of employees: 360,000+ (2025)
- Website: all.accor.com

Accor S.A. (French pronunciation: [akɔʁ]) is a French multinational hospitality company which owns, manages and franchises hotels, resorts and vacation properties. It is the largest hospitality company in Europe, and the sixth largest hospitality company worldwide.

Accor operates 5,836 locations in over 110 countries. Its total capacity is approximately 881,427 rooms (end 2025). It owns and operates more than 40 hospitality brands: Luxury (Orient Express, Raffles, Fairmont, Sofitel), premium (Pullman, Swissôtel), midscale (Novotel, Mercure, Adagio), and economy (ibis, hotelF1). Accor also owns companies specialized in digital hospitality and event organization, such as onefinestay, D-Edge, ResDiary, John Paul, Potel & Chabot and Wojo.

The company is headquartered in Issy-les-Moulineaux, France, and is a constituent of the CAC 40 index on the Paris stock exchange.

== History ==
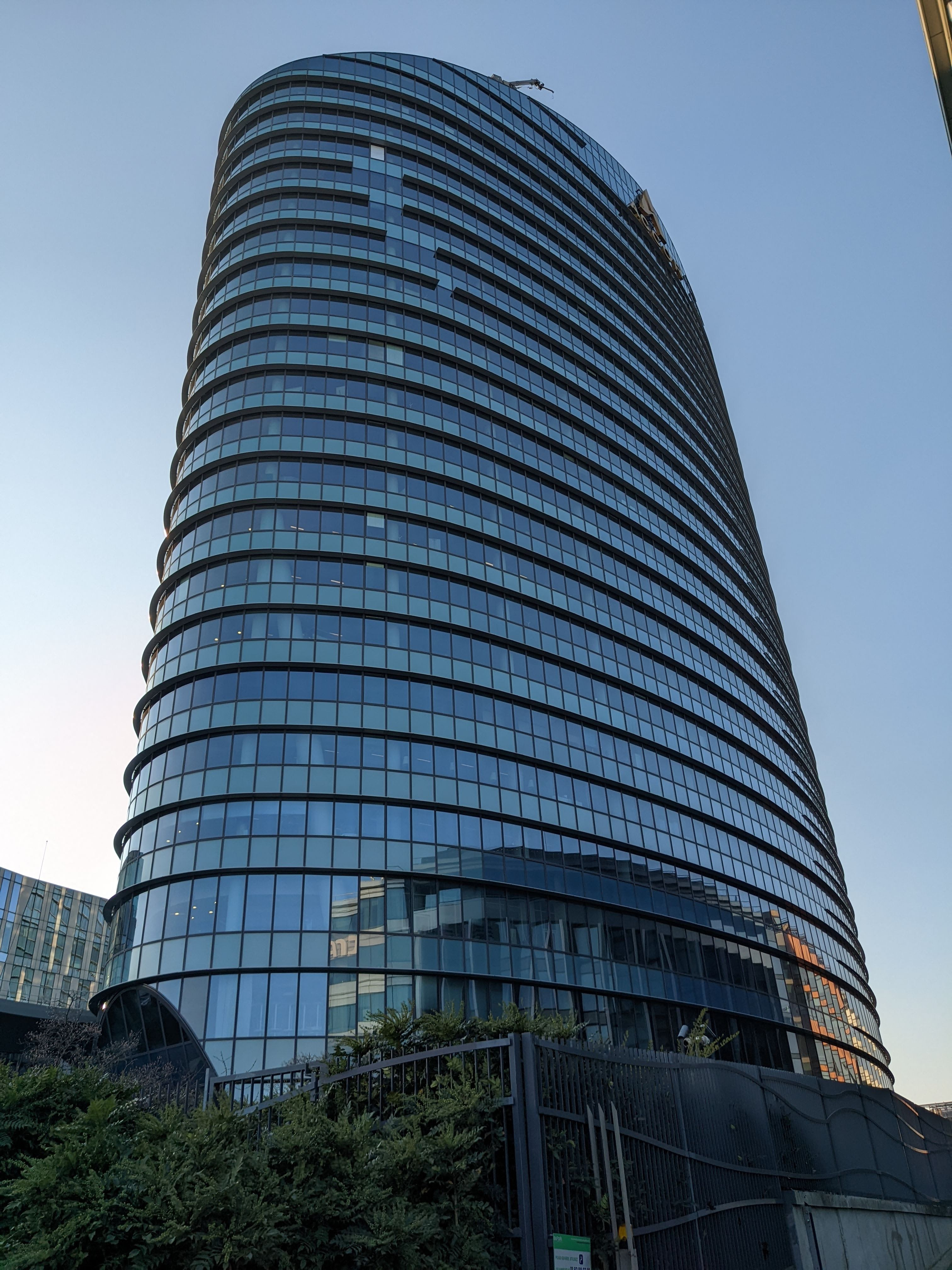
Tour Sequana, the headquarters of Accor in Issy-les-Moulineaux

=== 1967-1981: Novotel-SIEH ===
In 1967, Paul Dubrule and Gérard Pélisson founded the hospitality group Société d'investissement et d'exploitation hôteliers (SIEH) and opened the first Novotel hotel outside Lille in northern France.

In 1974, the first Ibis hotel was launched in Bordeaux, France. Ibis was then considered a light version of Novotel. In 1975, Novotel-SIEH acquired the restaurant brand Courtepaille and the Mercure hotels. In 1980, Novotel-SIEH acquired the Sofitel hotels (43 hotels). In 1981, Novotel-SIEH entered the Asian market with the opening of a Novotel in Singapore.

=== 1983: Merging and creating Accor ===
In 1983, Novotel-SIEH acquired and merged with the group Jacques Borel International to create the Accor group, which was introduced to the Paris stock exchange the same year. Accor is based on the word "Accord" meaning "agreement" in French.

In 1984, Accor bought the Quiberon thalassotherapy center, which became the first of the Thalasso Sea & Spa brand, and acquired the fine catering company Lenôtre the following year. In 1985, the firm launched Formule 1, a brand of low-cost hotels. The buildings themselves were modular blocks manufactured in factories and assembled onsite to minimise costs.

In 1990, the firm acquired the economy lodging company Motel 6 (536 motels in the United States). In 1991, it acquired the Compagnie Internationale des Wagons-Lits, which owned Pullman Hotels and Resorts, Altea, and Europcar. Accor also launched another economy hotel, Etap Hotel. In 1994, it merged the Compagnie Internationale des Wagons-Lits with Carlson Travel Network to create Carlson Wagonlit Travel (now CWT).

=== "Asset-light" realignment ===
In the mid-90s, Accor shifted its interest towards luxury and premium brands, and moved towards an asset-light model to focus on brand and product management, rather than property management. Economy and midscale brands remained the group's cash cow and enabled it to invest in less profitable but strategic upscale and luxury brands.

In 1997, the firm acquired the casino company SPIC, which became Accor Casino. In 1999, it acquired the US-based economy lodging company Red Roof Inn (322 hotels), and announced the creation of Accor Economy Lodging to bring Motel 6 and Red Roof Inn under one roof. Along with Colony Capital, it acquired the hotel brands Libertel and Demeure (40 properties in Europe). Accor settled in the United Kingdom with the opening of a Sofitel in the previous Cox & Co bank in Central London.

Accor launched the 3-star hotel brand SuiteHotel in 1999. In 2000, Accor took full control of Century International Hotels and Zenith Hotels International in Asia, bringing its number of hotels to 200 in the Asia-Pacific zone. The Sofitel Philadelphia (former Philadelphia Stock Exchange Building) was inaugurated, the first Sofitel to open in the US in a decade. Accor bought 20% of the Polish hotel company Orbis. In 2002, Accor settled in Mexico. In 2004, Accor bought a 28.9% stake in the French all-inclusive holidays' company Club Méditerranée.

In 2005, Gilles Pélisson, nephew of Accor's co-founder Gérard Pélisson, became chairman and CEO. The investment firm Colony Capital invested 1 billion euros in Accor. The firm sold its shares of Club Med in 2006 and Red Roof Inn in 2007.

=== New multi-brand strategy ===
In 2007, Accor launched the serviced-apartments brand Adagio in a 50/50 venture with Pierre & Vacances, relaunched Pullman as a premium hotel brand, and the Australian All Seasons as a global midscale hotel brand. In 2008, it launched the MGallery collection of upscale "personality" hotels.

In November 2010, Gilles Pélisson was replaced by Denis Hennequin as the head of Accor. Accor split its hotel activities from its voucher activities, Accor Services (which became Edenred and was listed on the stock exchange). Suitehotel was merged with Novotel.

In 2011, Accor revamped the Ibis brand by creating ibis Styles (formerly All Seasons) and ibis budget (formerly Etap Hotel). The group sold the fine catering group Lenôtre, and the Compagnie Internationale des Wagons-Lits. In 2012, the group launched the regional premium brand Grand Mercure in China (MeiJue), and sold Motel 6. In 2013, Accor redefined its group business model on two core competencies: hotel operator and brand franchisor (HotelServices), and hotel owner and investor (HotelInvest). The group acquired the premier apartment hotel brand The Sebel.

In August 2013, Sébastien Bazin became chairman and CEO of Accor. He introduced a new economic model around two poles: HotelServices, which operates and franchises hotels, and HotelInvest, which owns hotels and leads investments.

In 2014, Accor bought a 35% share in Mama Shelter (5 hotels) whose chief designer is Philippe Starck, and signed a strategic alliance with the China Lodging Group (Huazhu Hotels Group - 1900 hotels) to develop its hotel brands in China.

=== Lifestyle hospitality ===
In June 2015, Accor changed its name to AccorHotels and acquired FRHI Hotels & Resorts (Fairmont, Raffles, Swissôtel). In 2016, AccorHotels acquired John Paul (concierge and loyalty service), onefinestay (short-term vacation rentals), 30% of 25hours Hotels (Germany), and 30% of Oasis (accommodations provider). The new hotel brand Jo&Joe was launched, a strategic alliance was signed with Banyan Tree, and HotelInvest was spun off. In 2017, AccorHotels acquired Gekko (B2B hotel service), VeryChic (private sales for hotel deals), and merged Squarebreak and Travel Keys into onefinestay. AccorHotels acquired 50% of the brand Orient Express to relaunch it as a luxury hotel brand, Potel & Chabot (catering), and Noctis (event organization, renamed Paris Society). In 2018, AccorHotels sold 55% of HotelInvest for €4.4 billion and renaming it AccorInvest and launched a tender offer to take full control of Orbis. It acquired the Mantra Group (134 hotels under the brands Mantra, Peppers, Breakfree, Art Series), the Mövenpick Hotels & Resorts (84 hotels in 27 countries), and ResDiary (restaurant reservation and table management). AccorHotels partnered with Katara Hospitality to set up a $1-billion Africa-focused investment fund. China Lodging Group bought 4.5% of AccorHotels.

In 2019, the 21c Museum Hotels acquired the previous year were added to the MGallery collection. Its digital marketing companies for hotels (Availpro, Fastbooking) were merged into D-Edge Hospitality Solutions. The group took full control of Orbis (Its subsidiary AccorInvest acquired 98.6% shares of Orbis). Accor launched the new midscale hotel brand Tribe (born under the Mantra Group Management). After buying 50% of the SBE Entertainment Group (owner of Mondrian Hotels) in October 2018, Accor and SBE jointly launched the luxury hotel brand The House of Originals, and the premium hotel brand Hyde in Australia. In September 2019, Accor launched its first environment-conscious hotel brand, greet, with the first hotel opened in April that year in Beaune. On 3 December 2019, Accor repositioned its brand as ALL - Accor Live Limitless. The update merged Accor and its loyalty offering Le Club into one unified brand, ALL.

In the wake of the COVID-19 pandemic, Accor created CEDA (Coronavirus Emergency Desk Accor), a platform centralizing needs and providing accommodation solutions in France for front-line medical staff and vulnerable populations. The group allocated 70 million euros to launch the ALL Heartist Fund which was designed to assist employees and individual partners experiencing great financial difficulties. Accor and the certification agency Bureau Veritas launched a label guaranteeing high safety and cleanliness measures in the group's hotels and restaurants, and signed a strategic partnership with the insurance company Axa to provide medical assistance to the guests of its hotels worldwide.

In 2020, Accor opened more than 200 new hotels including its flagship Raffles Bali. On 24 November 2020, it announced that it is taking full ownership of SBE's Hotel assets (except Hudson Hotel in New York and Delano in Miami) as part of its simplification and asset-light strategy. It introduced Mövenpick Living as an extension of Mövenpick brand for extended stay segment. The company announced its strategic plan to focus on lifestyle hospitality. In 2021, Accor introduced the SPAC Accor Acquisition Company (AAC) on the Paris stock exchange, raising 300 million euros to lead investments in hotel-related businesses, sold a 1.5% share in the Chinese hotel management company Huazhu, and invested in the Indian tech hospitality company Treebo.

In October 2021, Qatar's Supreme Committee for Delivery & Legacy had signed an agreement with Accor to manage World Cup fan accommodation during the 2022 FIFA World Cup. According to the agreement Accor will provide staff to manage and operate more than 60,000 rooms in apartments and villas. The same month, Accor and Ennismore finalized their joint-venture of 14 hotel brands. Accor was the majority stakeholder (then sold 10.8% to a consortium of Qatari investors), and the founder of Ennismore Sharan Pasricha held a minority stake. Accor and the Italian hotel group Arsenale announced the launch of the Orient Express La Dolce Vita luxury trains. and the groups started to test urban autonomous cars with Citroën and JCDecaux.

In 2022, Accor bought Cunard's Queen Elizabeth 2 from PCFC Hotels. In 2023, Accor restructured into two distinct business units: "Economy, Midscale & Premium" unit (Ibis, Novotel, Mercure, Swissôtel, Mövenpick, Pullman, TRIBE from October 2023) and the "Luxury & Lifestyle" organized in four brand collections (Raffles & Orient Express, Fairmont, Sofitel & MGallery, Ennismore). The group announced the launch of Orient Express Silenseas, a luxury cruise built with Chantiers de l'Atlantique and planned for delivery March 2026. The construction of the first ship started in March 2024. In June 2024, Accor and LVMH signed a partnership to jointly develop the luxury travel brand Orient Express. In 2025, Accor's booking and loyalty platform reached 100 million members. Accor and InterGlobe (IndiGo's parent company) agreed to grow their common hotel platform from 70 to 300 by 2030, and jointly invested in Treebo, making the alliance the third hotel operator in India. The group started a partnership with the World Monuments Fund (WMF) to safeguard 4 cultural heritage sites listed in the 2025 World Monuments Watch. In the US, the group made its debut in Las Vegas with a franchise partnership to manage the Treasure Island on the Strip.

In 2026, Accor sold its remaining stake in Essendi to Blackstone for $1.1 billion dollars.

== Activities ==
Accor S.A. is a French multinational hospitality company that owns, manages and franchises hotels, resorts and vacation properties. It is the largest hospitality company in Europe, and the sixth largest hospitality company worldwide.

=== Brands ===
  - Luxury:
  - Orient Express
  - Raffles Hotels and Resorts (FRHI Hotels & Resorts)
  - Faena
  - Banyan Tree Hotels and Resorts (Banyan Group)
  - Sofitel Legend
  - Fairmont Hotels and Resorts (FRHI Hotels & Resorts)
  - Sofitel
  - MGallery
  - Emblems (Emblems Group)
  - Premium:
  - Mantis (Mantis Group)
  - Art Series (Mantra Group)
  - Pullman
  - Swissôtel (FRHI Hotels & Resorts)
  - Mövenpick
  - Grand Mercure
  - Peppers (Mantra Group)
  - The Sebel
  - Midscale:
  - Mantra (Mantra Group)
  - Novotel
  - Mercure
  - Aparthotel Adagio
  - Handwritten Collection
  - Tribe
  - Economy:
  - BreakFree (Mantra Group)
  - ibis
  - ibis Styles
  - ibis budget
  - hotelF1
  - greet
  - Ennismore joint-venture:
  - 21c Museum Hotels
  - 25 Hours
  - Delano
  - Gleneagles
  - Hyde
  - Jo&Joe
  - Mama Shelter
  - Mondrian
  - Morgans Originals
  - SLS
  - SO/
  - The Hoxton
  - working from_
  - Rixos
  - Our Habitas
  - Rikas

=== Other activities ===
Brand	Description	Since
D-Edge Hospitality Solutions	SaaS company for hotels	2015
John Paul	White label concierge services, affinity marketing and event management	2016
onefinestay	Mobile application for short-term rentals of upscale apartments and houses	2016
Gekko	B2B hotel distribution platform	2017
Mamaworks	Coworking spaces in France and Luxembourg	2017
Paris Society	Organization of events and entertainment	2017
Potel & Chabot	Upscale catering	2017
Verychic	Private sales of hotels and luxury stays	2017
Adoria	Platform for the catering industry to optimize supply management	2018
Astore	Hotel/restaurant purchase platform	2018
ResDiary	Reservation and management of restaurant tables	2018
Wojo	Coworking spaces (within the group's hotels)	2018
Thalassa	Spa	1984

=== Loyalty programme ===
Accor launched All (Accor Live Limitless), a loyalty program, in 2019. It was accompanied by a platform allowing customers to use their accumulated points to book exclusive experiences. The programme offers access to discounted hotel stays and includes benefits negotiated with partners in the fields of travel (airlines, trainlines, etc.), insurance, and shopping. In the sports sector, Accor capitalises on the stadiums it sponsors (the Accor Arena in Paris and Accor Stadium in Sydney) by offering, for example, premium concert tickets or backstage access to artists.

The programme reached 100 million members in 2025. The loyalty strategy helps attract and retain customers. As a result, one in three rooms was booked by an All member in 2025. It also supports premiumisation, with All members spending on average twice as much as other guests in the group’s hotels. In January 2026, the programme was expanded with All Accor+, paid membership cards aimed at regular customers, particularly business travellers. For an average annual fee of several hundred euros, these cards provide discounts on room rates and meals.

== Financial results ==
Financial results
Year	2010	2011	2012	2013	2014	2015	2016	2017	2018	2019	2020	2021	2022	2023	2024	2025
Revenue	5,948	6,100	5,649	5,425	5,454	5,581	1,646	1,937	3,610	4,049	1,621	2,204	4,224	5,056	5,606	5,639
Net income	3600	27	(599)	126	223	244	265	441	2,233	464	(1,988)	85	392	633	610	449

Shareholders
Parvus Asset Management	10%
Kingdom Holding Co. (Investment Management)	6.7%
Qatar Investment Authority	6.2%
BlackRock	5.7%
Floating	71.4%

== Management ==
Board of directors as of June 2026:

- Sébastien Bazin (chairman and CEO since 2013)
- Asma Abdulrahman Al-Khulaifi (director since May 2022)
- Ugo Arzani (director since May 2022)
- Hélène Auriol Potier (independent director since May 2022)
- Iliane Dumas (director representing employees since May 2014)
- Katherine Elizabeth Fleming (independent director since May 2025)
- Qiong'Er Jiang (director since July 2016)
- Anne-Laure Kiechel (independent director since May 2023)
- Bruno Pavlovsky (independent director since June 2020)
- Christine Serre (director representing employees since January 2021)
- Isabelle Simon (independent director since July 2016)
- Samad Zok (director since July 2016)

== Animal welfare ==
In 2016, Accor, in partnership with Humane Society International, committed to sourcing only cage-free or free-range eggs in its restaurants, with a goal of full implementation by the end of 2021 in regions with developed supply chains (such as Europe, the Pacific, and North America), and by 2025 in markets where supply chains were still emerging. In 2025, the company released a report detailing progress through the end of 2024, acknowledging efforts made but indicating that the targets—particularly in South and Southeast Asia—were unlikely to be met, resulting in a failure to fully achieve its pledge.

== Sustainability ==
Accor is aiming to achieve carbon neutrality by 2050. To do so it has split its emissions into three scopes with separate targets for each; scope 1 (direct emissions), scope 2 (indirect emissions related to electricity purchases) and scope 3 (indirect emissions). The goals for each scope start with a 25% reduction in scopes 1 and 2 by 2025 (from baseline figures in 2019). This will then climb to 46% by 2030 and a target of 28% reduction in scope 3 emissions over the same timeframe. The plan was validated by the Science Based Targets Initiative. In 2021, Accor issued its first sustainability-linked bonds for an amount of 700 million euros.

In February 2024, Accor partnered with Qualmark to target gold certification for sustainable tourism for its New Zealand hotels. In March of the same year, Accor announced water "stewardship" initiatives across its properties and operations including a reduction in water footprint in its food and beverages services and incentives for guests to opt out of their rooms being cleaned daily.

== See also ==
- Accor Arena, venue in Paris
- Accor Stadium, venue in Sydney
