= Adagio (hotel) =

Apartment hotel chain

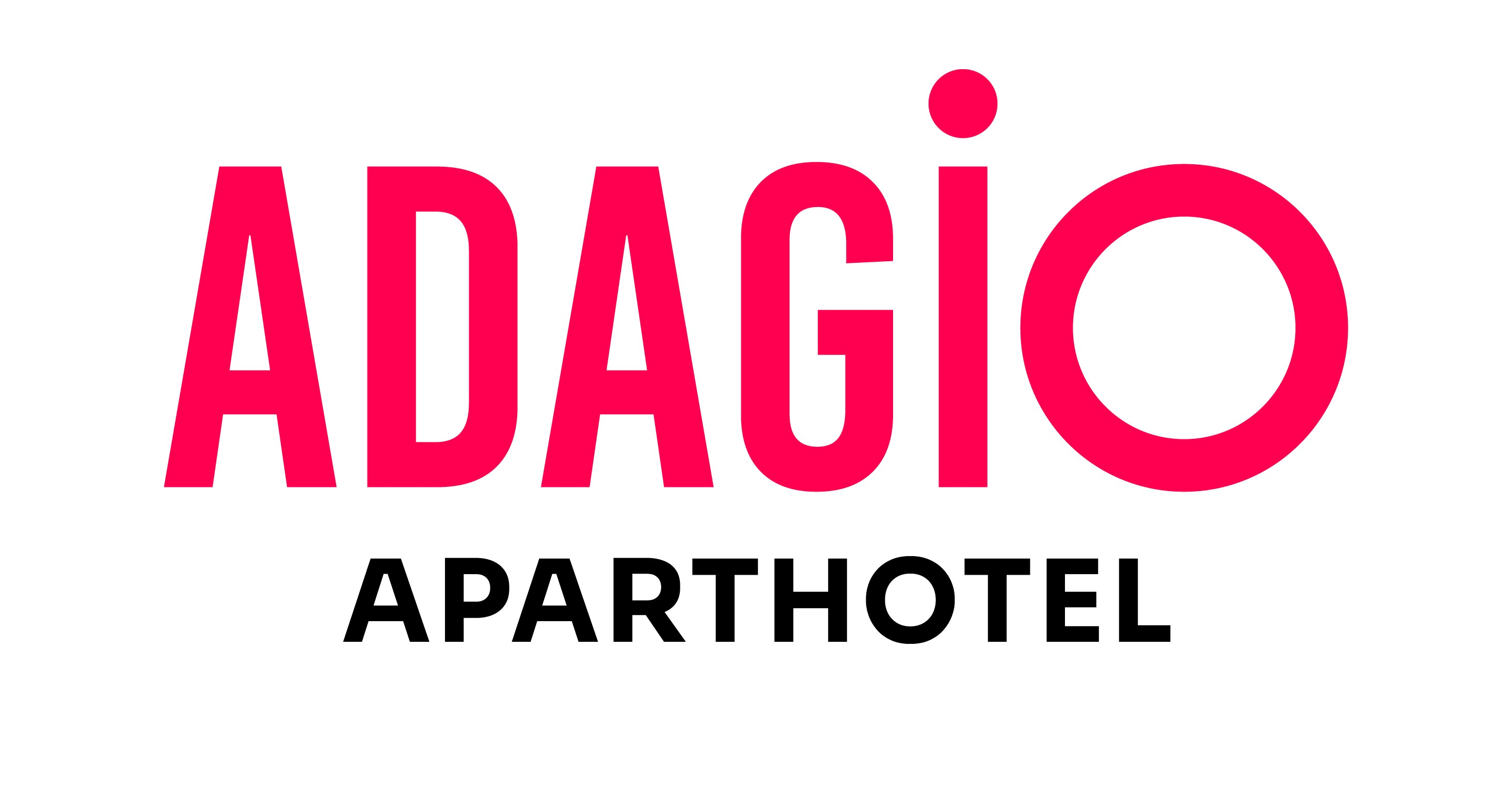
- Type: Joint venture
- Industry: Hospitality
- Headquarters: Paris
- Number of locations: 130
- Area served: Europe, Africa, South America, Middle East
- Products: Hotel
- Parent: Accor

Adagio is a joint venture launched by Accor and Pierre & Vacances operating apartment hotels.

== History ==
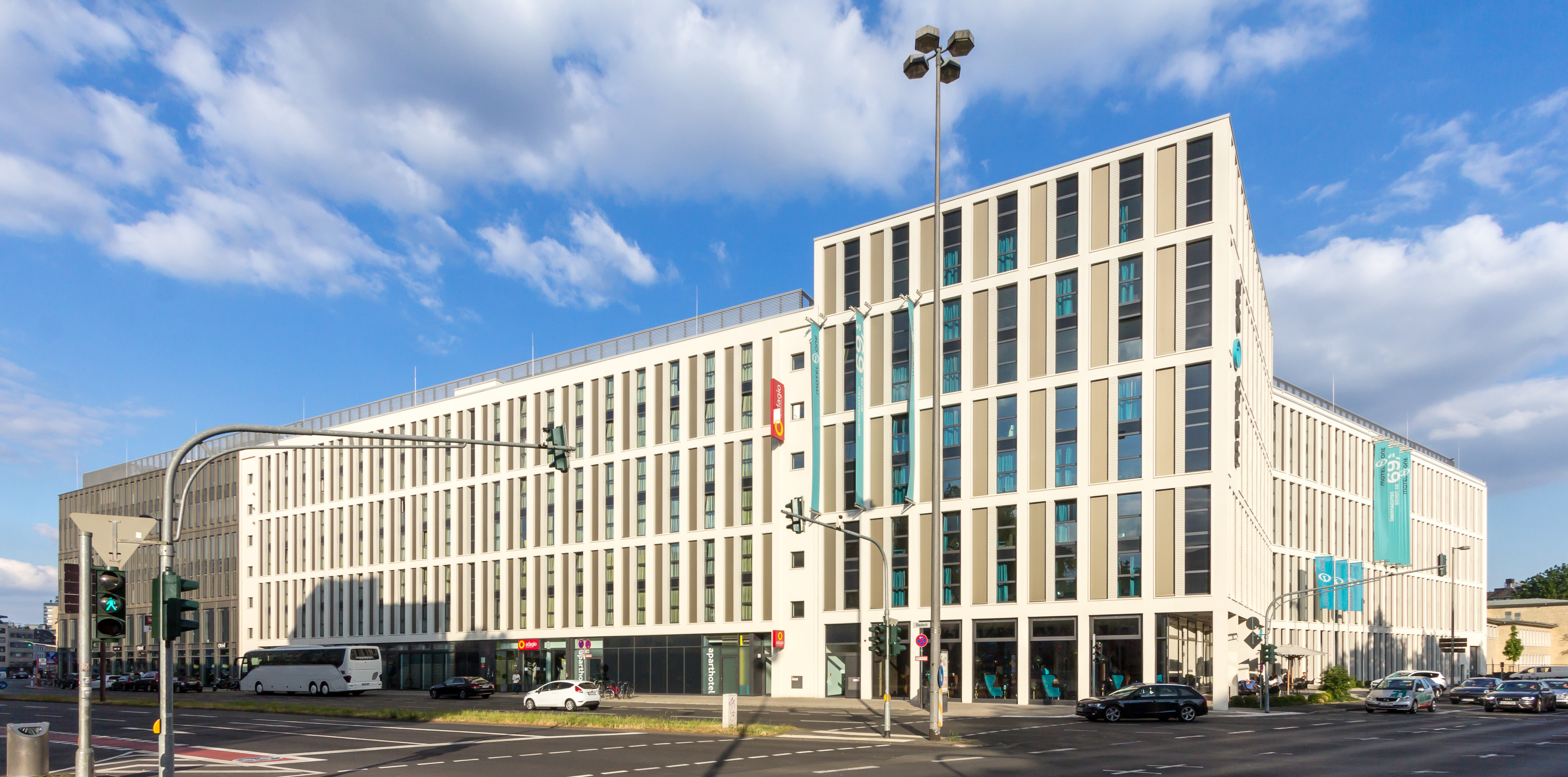
Adagio Aparthotel in Cologne

Adagio City Aparthotel is a joint venture launched by AccorHotels and Pierre & Vacances in October 2007. It manages residences and Hotel to rent in tourist cities. The city residences correspond to business travelers on a long term assignment but also French or foreign families on vacation, who can use their kitchens in these apartments and avoid restaurant expenses. Urban tourism has a much higher growth rate than the overall average growth rate of tourism in France in terms of overnight stays, according to specialists.

In 2011, Adagio complemented its offerings with the acquisition of Citéa becoming Adagio Access. The Adagio network is composed of offers for Adagio (the standard package) and Adagio Access (economy offer).

== Locations ==
In 2025, Adagio is present in 16 countries (Europe and Africa), comprising 130 aparthotels and 14,562 apartments.

The brand since expanded into further countries like Russia, Qatar, and Brazil.

== Brands ==
- Adagio Premium
- Adagio Original
- Adagio Access
