= Gérard Pelisson =

French businessman (1932–2023)

Gérard Pélisson
- Born: 9 February 1932; Lyon, France
- Died: 6 March 2023 (aged 91); Mouans-Sartoux
- Education: École Centrale Paris; Massachusetts Institute of Technology
- Occupations: Founder of Accor, president of the Institute Paul Bocuse
- Relatives: Gilles Pélisson (nephew)

Gérard Pélisson (9 February 1932 – 6 March 2023) was a French hotelier and businessman who was the co-founder of the Accor Group, and president of the Institut Paul Bocuse.

== Early life ==
Pelisson was born in Lyon in 1932 and obtained his engineering diploma from the École Centrale Paris in 1955. He was a graduate of Massachusetts Institute of Technology (MIT) in Boston.

== Career ==
Pelisson co-founded the hospitality company the Accor Group.

In September 2008, he wrote, together with Paul Dubrule, the history of the adventure of Accor Group published in the Harmony of the Accor Group by Transversales Éditions. As one of the supporters of Charles Millon, he was a Patron of the International School of Business and Development 3A in 1993.

Pelisson was president of the Union des Français de l'Étranger from 1997–2023.

On 27 January 2011, he delivered a press conference concerning the reasons the Accor Group left Tunisia 3 years before. In his words, he mentioned "In Tunisia, we were forced, for example, to buy for 7 million euros a run-down hotel that was completely worthless, in order to allow the bank to list that sum as an asset. This is no longer possible".

== Bibliography ==
Le Bonheur d'entreprendre, de Novotel à Accor (Undertaken Happiness): a great human adventure, Jean-Philippe Bozek, 2010 ed. (history of Gérard Pélisson and Accor Group written in the form of a fictionalized biography).

== Death ==
On 6 March 2023, Pelisson died at the age of 91. Business executive and President of TF1 Gilles Pélisson is his nephew.
