= Ibis (hotel) =

French brand of economy hotels

- Type: Subsidiary
- Industry: Hospitality
- Founded: 1974
- Founder: Gérard Pelisson; Paul Dubrule
- Headquarters: Évry, France
- Number of locations: 1,249 (December 2025)
- Area served: Worldwide
- Products: Hotels
- Parent: Accor
- Website: ibis.accor.com

Ibis (stylised as ibis) is a French brand of budget hotels owned by Accor. Created in 1974, Ibis became Accor's "economy megabrand" in 2011 with the rebranding of Ibis Styles and Ibis Budget from All Seasons and Etap Hôtel respectively. As of 31 December 2025, there were 1,242 hotels under the Ibis brand (excluding Styles and Budget hotels), with 154,177 rooms worldwide.

== History ==
=== Foundation and early years ===
The first Ibis hotel opened in Bordeaux in 1974. It was created by the Accor group (then Novotel-SIEH) to engineer more affordable Novotels. By 1988, Ibis operated 182 hotels in France. In the USA, the first Ibis hotel opened in 1983. The chain spread through the states of Texas, Florida and Georgia. However, by the end of the 1980s, Ibis exited the US market. In the UK, by 1995, Ibis operated 8 hotels.

In 1997, Ibis launched its 15-minute guarantee program which consisted in offering the stay if an Ibis hotelier could not fix a customer's issue with a room within 15 minutes.

=== Development since 2000 ===
By 2004, Ibis operated 700 hotels in 36 countries. From 2003 to 2005, Ibis opened in South Korea, China and Thailand. In October 2009, Ibis reached the 100,000 rooms milestone and opened its first hotel in Moscow, followed by a 50th hotel in Brazil and a first hotel in Japan. In 2012, Ibis' largest hotel in the Asia-Pacific region opened in Bandung. In September 2011, Accor rebranded All Seasons into Ibis Styles, and Etap Hôtel into Ibis Budget, turning Ibis into the group's economy megabrand. The mattresses, pillows and digital access were upgraded. Following this restructuring, the Ibis megabrand (including both other chains) became the biggest hotel operator in Europe in 2013, with 1,277 hotels. In January 2014, Ibis itself opened its 1,000th hotel.

In September 2012, Ibis tested Sleep Art, a robot that made a painting based on the movements, sounds, and heat variations of the sleeper. Sleep Art was turned into a mobile app for all Ibis customers 6 months later.

== Development ==
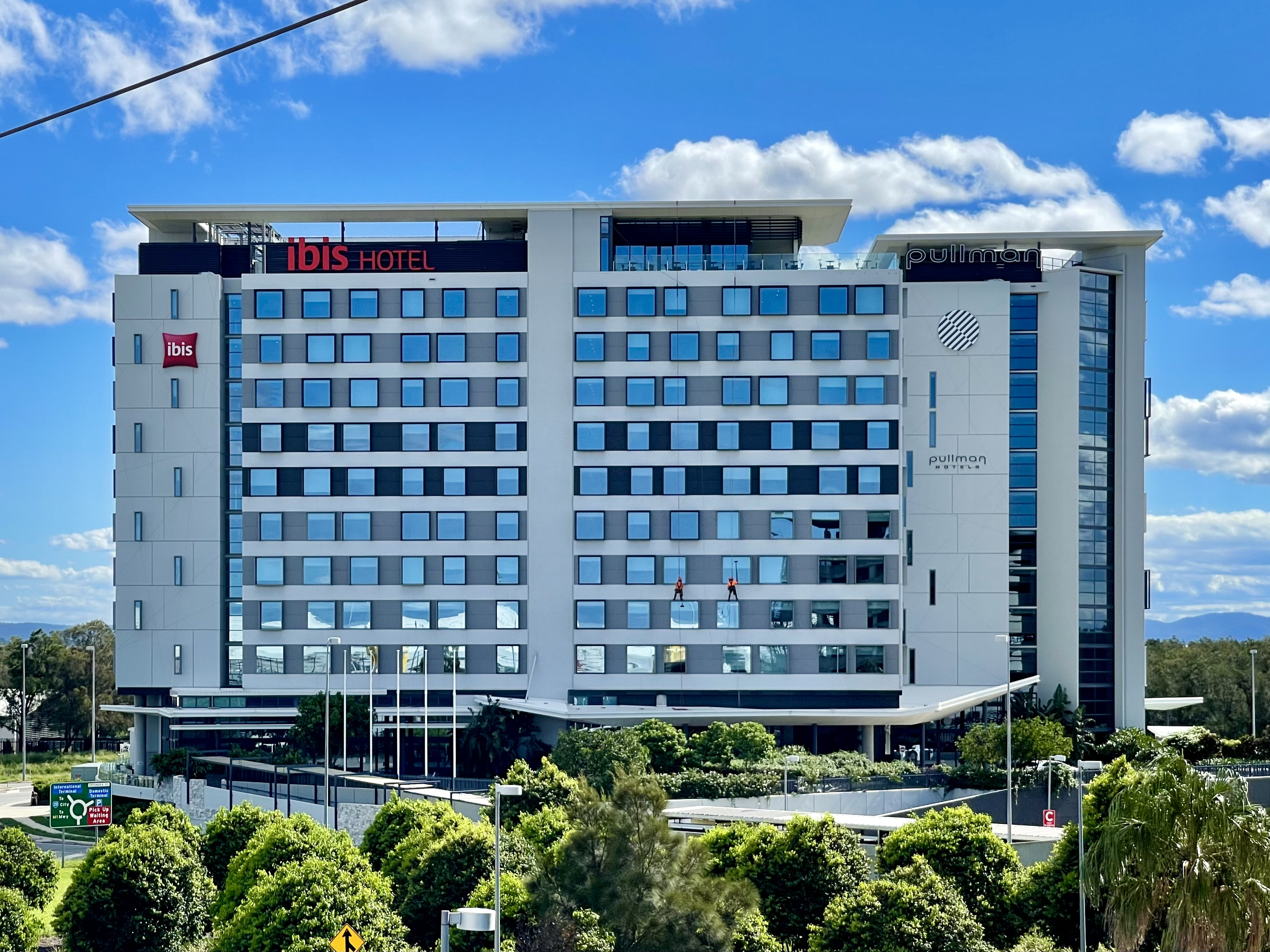
Ibis in Brisbane

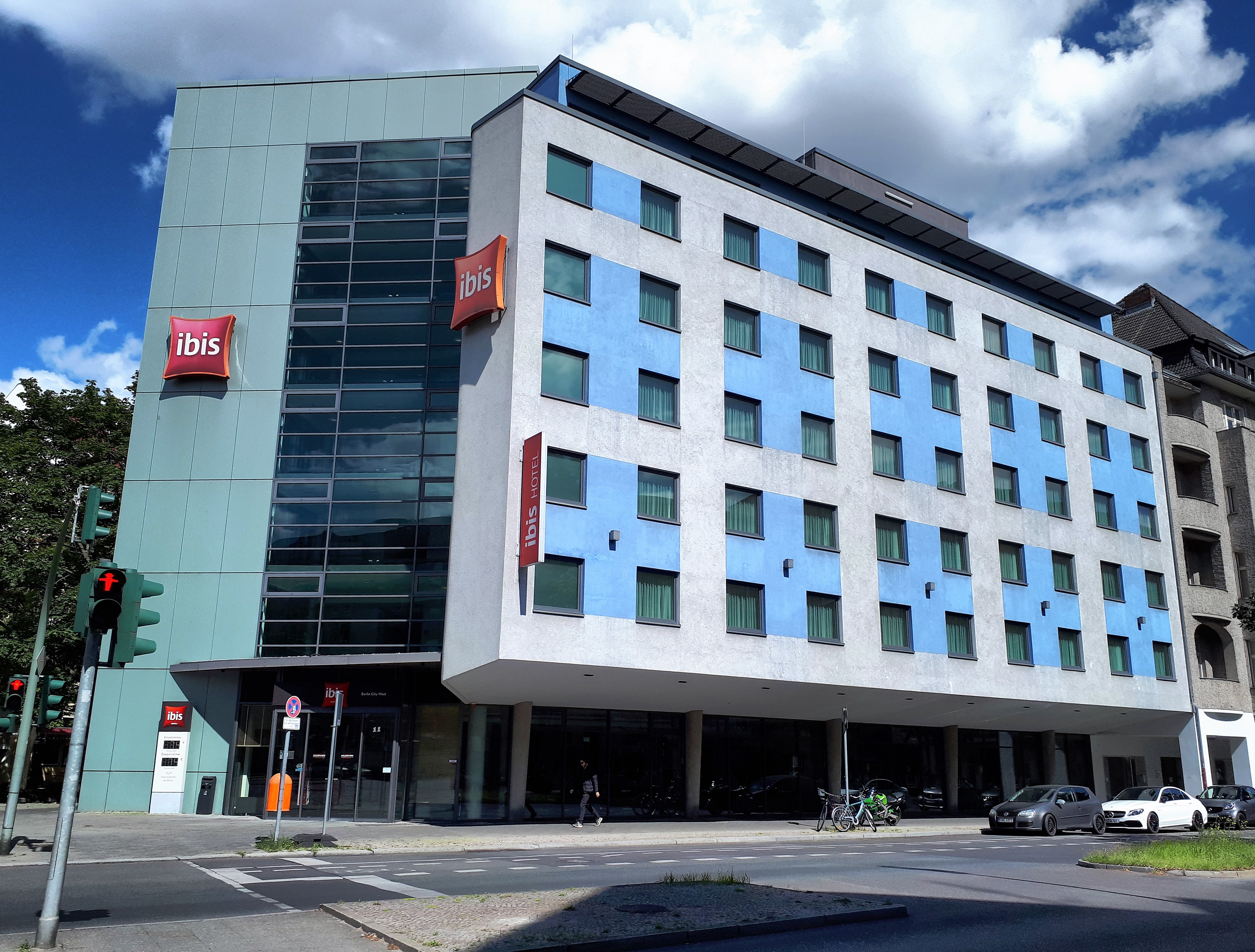
Ibis in Berlin

Year	Hotels	Rooms
2025	1,242	154,177
2020	1,233	156,149
2019	1,218	155,678
2018	1,174	150,748
2017	1,137	145,081
2016	1,088	138,741
2015	1,068	134,786
2014	1,031	129,009
2013	999	124,022
2012	983	121,004
2011	933	113,077

== See also ==
- Accor
- Ibis Styles
- Ibis Budget
