= Novotel =

International hotel chain

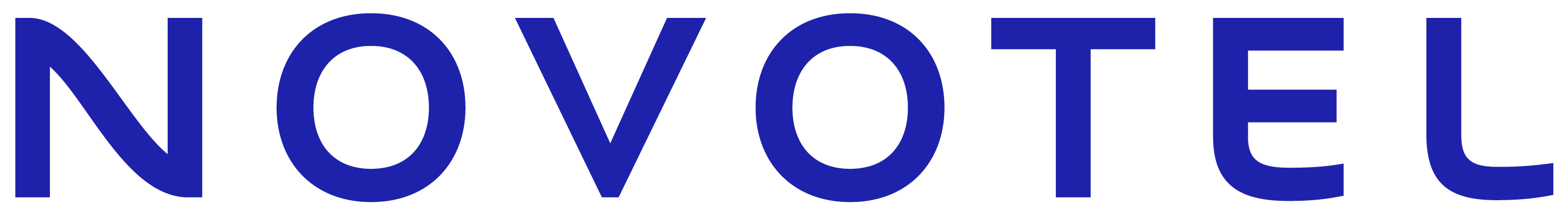
- Type: Subsidiary
- Industry: Hospitality
- Founded: 1967; 59 years ago
- Founder: Paul Dubrule; Gérard Pélisson
- Headquarters: Issy-les-Moulineaux, France
- Number of locations: 620 (2026)
- Area served: Worldwide
- Parent: Accor
- Website: novotel.accor.com

Novotel is a French midscale hotel brand owned by Accor. Created in 1967 in France, the company grew into what became the Accor group in 1983, and Novotel remained a pillar brand of Accor's multi-brand strategy. Novotel manages over 600 hotels in 67 countries (2026). Since 2010, Novotel also includes the apartment hotel brand Novotel Suites.

== History ==
=== From Novotel to Accor ===
The first Novotel was launched in Lille, France, in 1967. It was inspired by American motels with comfortable rooms, a restaurant and parking. By 1970, seven Novotel hotels were in operation, and the group raised the funds to develop internationally.

By 1975, Novotel opened 60 hotels in France and 13 in Europe. Novotel bought Mercure in 1975, and Sofitel in 1980. In 1981, Novotel entered the Asian market with the opening of a hotel in Singapore.

Novotel reached the top 10 of hotel groups worldwide with 319 hotels. It turned into the Accor group in 1983, and was introduced to the Paris stock exchange index the same year. Novotel survived as Accor's strong midscale brand alongside Mercure. In 1984, Novotel bought the New York Times Square building, a city where the company already operated the Roosevelt Hotel on Madison Avenue.

In 1986, Novotel introduced full breakfast buffets. In 1995, Novotel launched an international competition to award the best chefs of its hotels, which became the Victoires internationales de la cuisine in 2001 and stretched its scope to ibis and Mercure chefs.

=== Since 2000s: Modernization ===
By the end of the 1990s, ibis hotels took the leadership on cities' peripheries, leading Novotel to redefine a strategy towards city centers, and to launch a global refurbishment program based on design and modularity, bringing Novotel closer to Accor's upscale brand Sofitel. In 2004, Novotel introduced more ergonomic and elegant rooms (Novation) rooms. In 2008, Novotel introduced new organic bath products branded "N".

In November 2011, Novotel and Microsoft prototyped a futuristic room showcased at the Paris Vaugirard location and dubbed "Room 3120". In 2013, the Xbox became available to customers, and successfully tested a virtual concierge (Monscierge) within its hotels. In 2014, Novotel introduced a multimedia table, PLAY, to provide digital guest services.

In 2012, Novotel sold its New York Times Square location in a €160m sale and management-back deal. In 2013, Novotel opened its 100th hotel in Asia Pacific. In 2016, Novotel opened its largest hotel worldwide, in Madrid, and a new flagship hotel in London's Canary Wharf the following year. In 2017, the "N" rooms were launched, another step towards design customization. In July 2018, Novotel opened in Seoul its 500th hotel worldwide. In May 2019, Accor opened the Novotel Miami Brickell, the brand's second hotel in the USA.

=== Novotel for the People and Planet ===
Alongside hotel design and technology, Novotel introduced a series of ocean conservation and guest-wellbeing initiatives during the 2020s.

In June 2024, Novotel launched a three-year international partnership with WWF France to support ocean conservation across its hotels, including sustainable seafood sourcing and support for WWF marine conservation projects. In its second annual Ocean Impact Report, published in June 2026, Novotel reported that 41% of its hotels had removed more than 350 vulnerable seafood species from menus in line with WWF sustainable seafood principles, and that over 1,600 chefs and kitchen staff had completed WWF sustainable seafood training.

In January 2026, Novotel launched Longevity Everyday, the brand's vision based on four key pillars: Eat, Sleep, Move and Meet. The ambition included a redesigned bed rolling out across hotels, a commitment to at least 25% plant-forward menu options, and a partnership with Paris Saint-Germain, among other initiatives.

A panel of experts known as the Novotel 37 Collective was created to translate wellness advice and science into real, actionable steps. Members of the Collective include Olympic surf champion Kauli Vaast, Australia's leading sleep expert Olivia Arezzolo, leading vegan food creator Alfie Steiner, former Paris Saint-Germain footballer Javier Pastore, and marine biologist and underwater filmmaker Kaushiik Subramaniam.

== Description ==
Novotel caters to business and leisure travelers, with hotels located in the heart of major international cities, business districts and tourist destinations. Novotel manages over 600 hotels in 67 countries (2026).

== Development ==
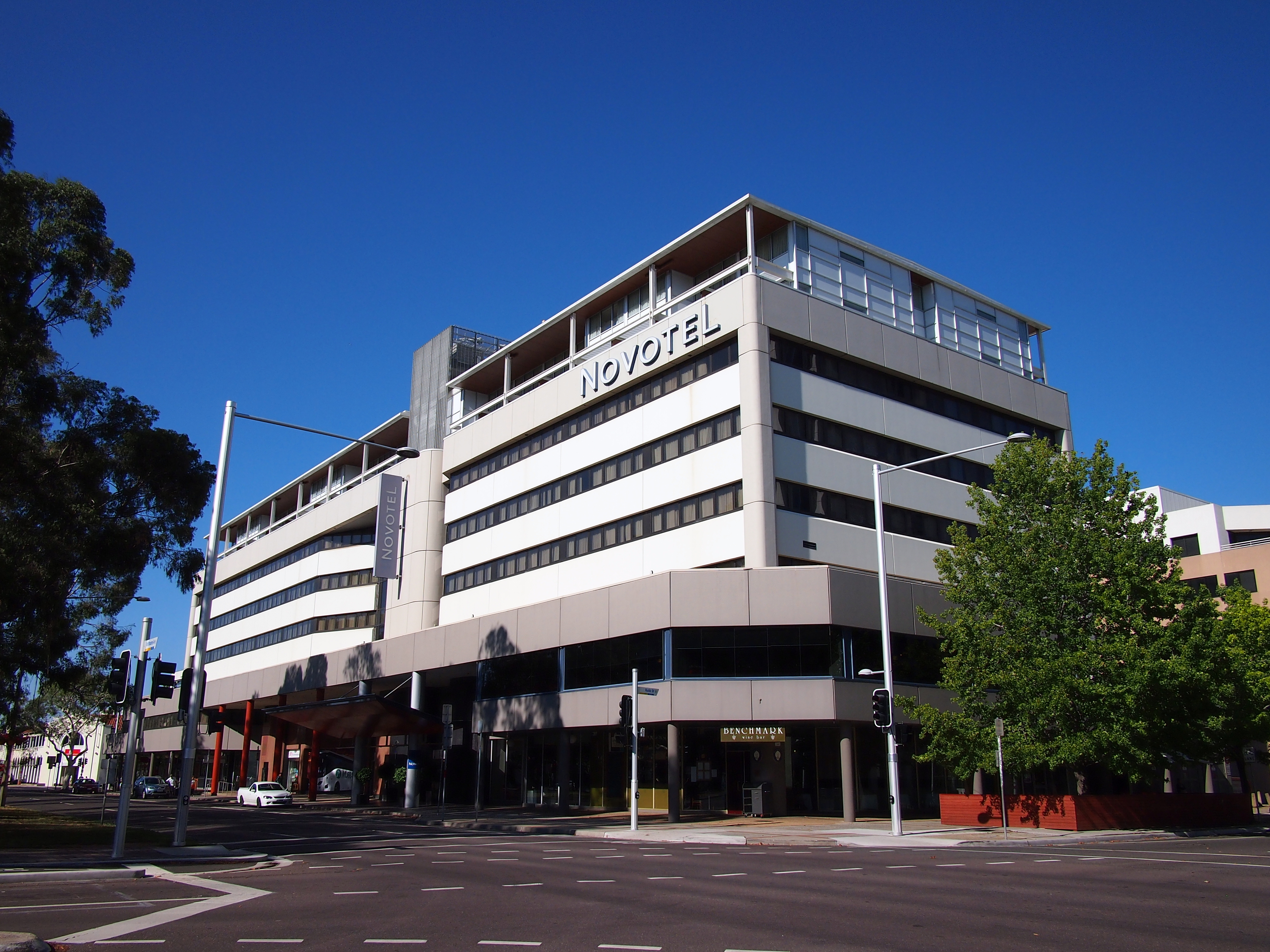
Novotel in Canberra

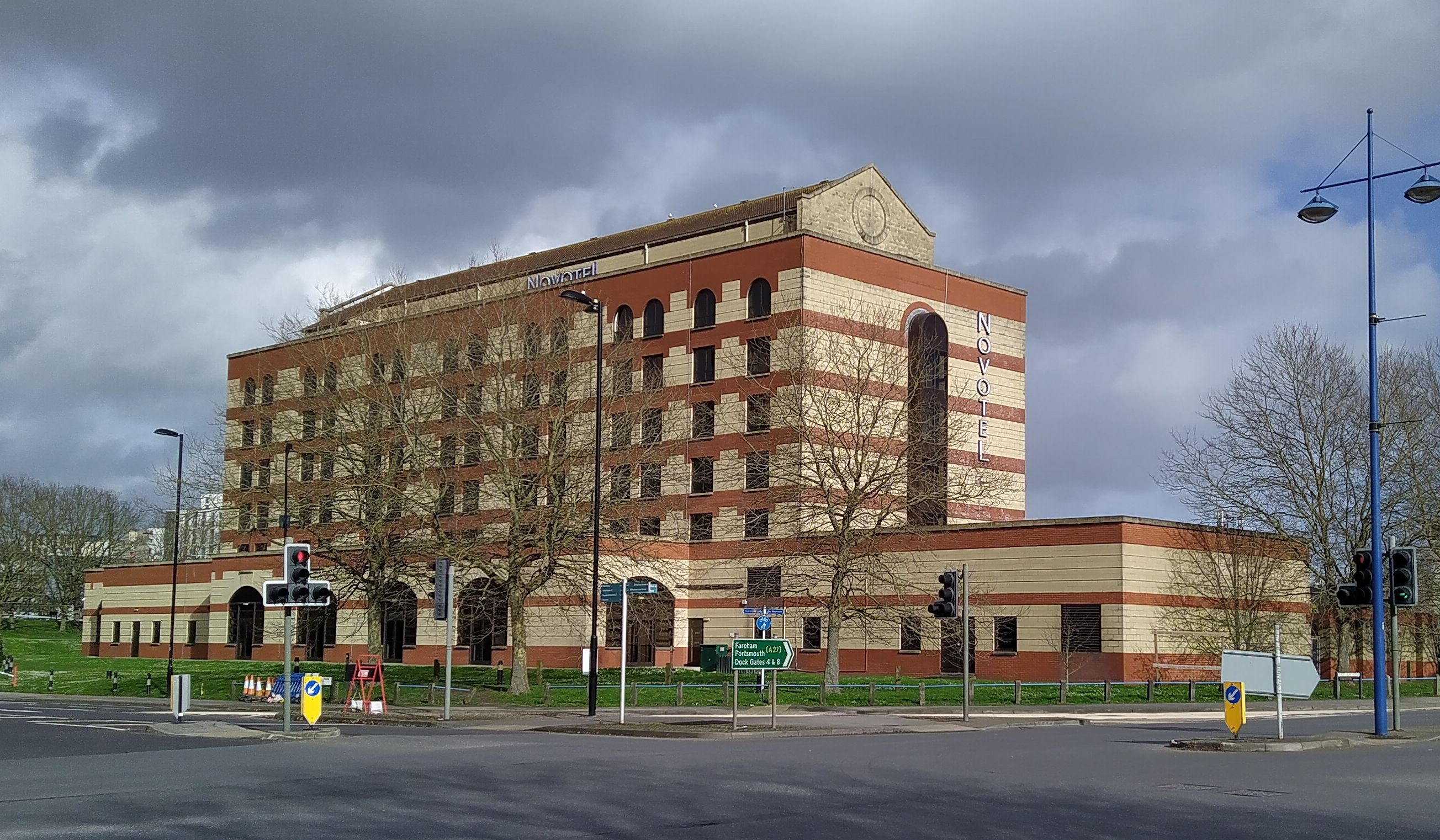
Novotel in Southampton

Development since 2011
Year	Hotels	Rooms
2021	559	108,272
2020	542	105,559
2019	536	104,835
2018	527	102,795
2017	492	98,903
2016	464	92,843
2015	448	89,219
2014	428	83,340
2013	414	79,220
2012	401	76,383
2011	395	74,502

== See also ==
- Accor
- Mercure
