= Ibis Styles =

Economy hotel brand

- Formerly: All Seasons
- Type: Subsidiary
- Industry: Hospitality
- Founded: 2011
- Headquarters: Évry, France
- Number of locations: 701 (December 2025)
- Area served: Worldwide
- Products: Hotels
- Parent: Accor
- Website: ibis.accor.com

Ibis Styles is a French budget hotel brand owned by Accor. Created in 1980 in Australia with the name All Seasons, the brand was acquired by Accor in 1999 and renamed Ibis Styles in 2011. As of 31 December 2025, Ibis Styles manages 701 hotels with 75,577 rooms worldwide.

== History ==
=== 1980: All Seasons ===
The hotel chain All Seasons was created in Australia in 1980. By 1999, it operated 27 hotels when it was acquired by the French hotel group Accor.

In 2007, Accor relaunched All Seasons in France, making it a non-standardized economy brand focused on stylish designs. The pillow logo was introduced. In 2010, the All Seasons network of hotels reached 100 locations.

=== 2011: Ibis Styles ===
In September 2011, Accor rebranded All Seasons into Ibis Styles, and Etap Hôtel into Ibis Budget, turning Ibis into the group's economy megabrand. The "Sweet Bed" was rolled out throughout the Ibis brands, the first bed entirely designed by a hotel group. The mattresses, pillows and digital access were upgraded. The lobby was turned into a living space. Following this restructuring, the Ibis megabrand became the leading hotel operator in Europe in 2013 with 1,277 hotels. The first Ibis Styles signs were installed in December 2012. The last remaining hotel with the old All Seasons name was located in Jakarta as of 2022.

From 2011 to 2014, the number of Ibis Styles hotels increased by 65% reaching 250 locations in 21 countries. In 2016, Accor announced the launch of Ibis Styles in the United States, near the LaGuardia Airport in New York, at the London Heathrow Airport. and in India. In Africa, Ibis Styles became the hotel chain with the most planned openings.

In 2018, Ibis Styles opened the first hotel entirely dedicated to European comics in Geneva. In 2019, Ibis Styles introduced Lit'maginaire (Bed'maginary), an augmented reality application connected to a pillow and simulating a trip into space. In January 2020, Ibis Styles launched in the Philippines. Ibis Styles Manila Araneta City, in Cubao, Quezon City, beside the Araneta Coliseum has 286 rooms.

ibis Styles Kuala Lumpur Bukit Bintang officially opened in the Malaysian capital of Kuala Lumpur in January 2025 and has 168 rooms. ibis Styles Kuala Lumpur Bukit Bintang is located on the bustling Jalan Alor and is surrounded by famous local snacks, including charcoal grilled chicken wings from Wong Ah Wah restaurant.

== Description ==
Ibis Styles is part of the Ibis family, which also includes the brands Ibis and Ibis Budget. It is an economy hotel brand focused on in-style stays and owned by Accor. Each hotel reflects the spirit of its location. Ibis Styles manages 476 hotels in 45 countries (2018).

== Development ==
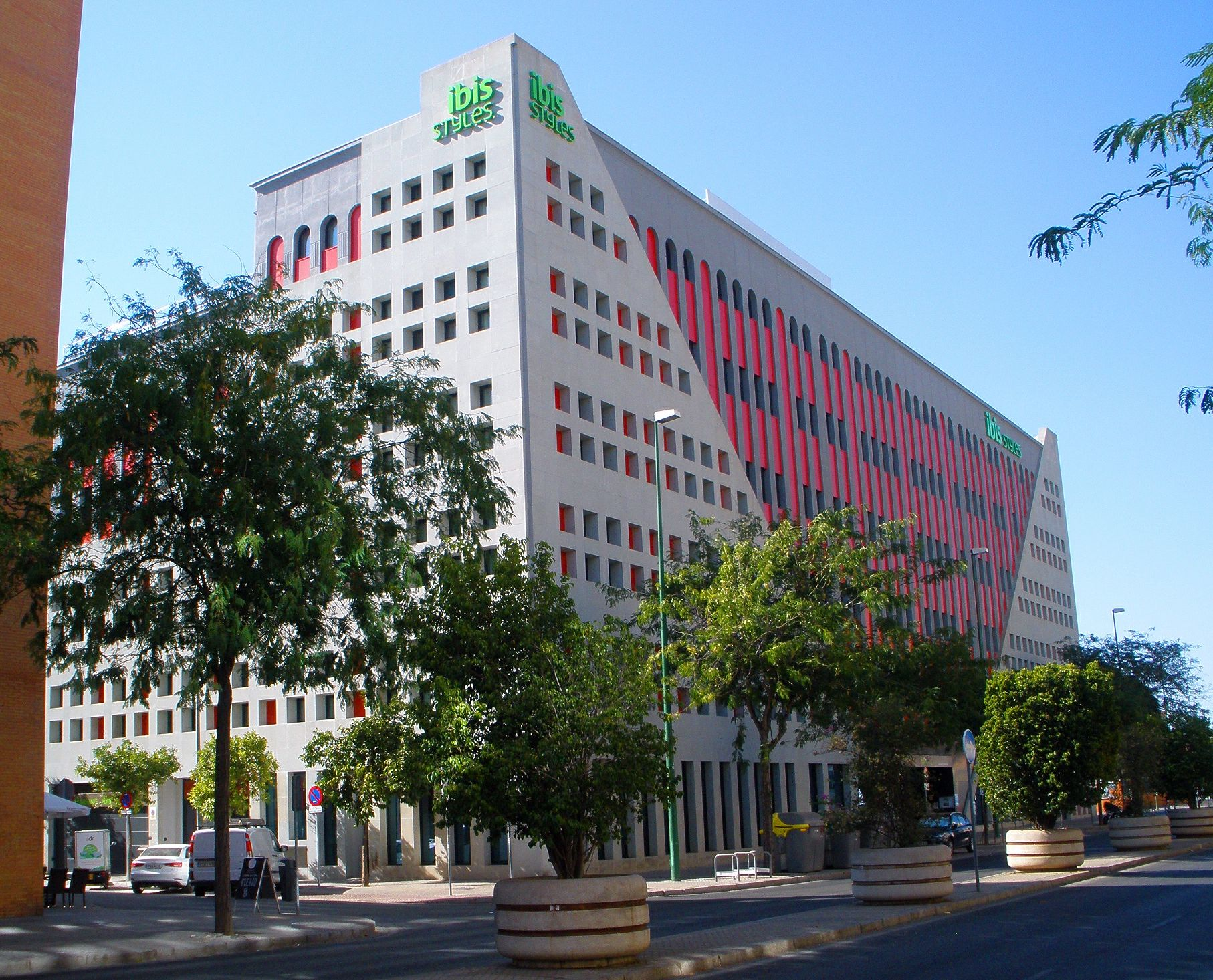
Ibis Styles in Sevilla

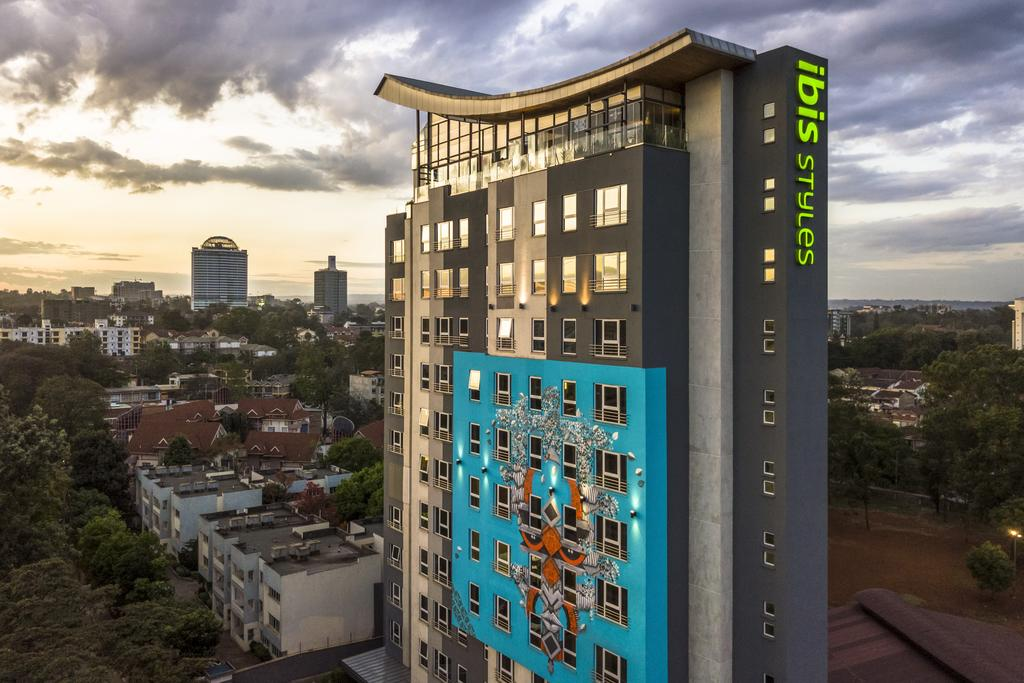
Ibis Styles in Nairobi

Development since 2011
Year	Hotels	Rooms
2025	701	75,577
2020	562	59,481
2019	534	56,227
2018	476	48,842
2017	422	43,213
2016	367	36,144
2015	310	29,274
2014	277	25,100
2013	233	21,156
2012	192	16,538
2011	149	13,110

== See also ==
- Accor
- Ibis (hotel)
- Ibis Budget
