= Treebo Hotels =

Indian Hotel Chain

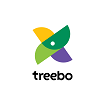
- Founder: Sidharth Gupta; Rahul Chaudhary; Kadam Jeet Jain
- Founded at: India
- Headquarters: Bengaluru
- Services: Hotels
- Staff: 500+ employees
- Website: www.treebo.com

Treebo Hotels is an Indian hotel chain headquartered in Bengaluru, India that operates on a franchising model.

As of October 2023, Treebo Hotel owns over 1000 hotels in 120 cities throughout India.

== History ==
Treebo Hotels was founded in June 2015 as Zipotel by the IIT Roorkee graduates Sidharth Gupta, Rahul Chaudhary and Kadam Jeet Jain. Treebo Hotels won the award for the "Best Budget Hotel" category in the Lonely Planet Travel and Lifestyle Leadership Awards 2017.

In July 2016, Treebo raised a $17 million round of investment. In August 2017, Treebo raised an additional investment round of $34 million. As of now, Treebo has raised $57 million and is backed by SAIF Partners and Matrix India Partners as investors. In May 2018, Treebo made its first acquisition of the online events discovery platform Events High. In November 2018, Treebo launched three sub-brands (Trip, Trend, Tryst) as part of its new branding strategy. Treebo Trip Hotels offer basic comforts, Treebo Trend Hotels are the major chunk of properties, and Treebo Tryst Hotels are the premium Treebo properties.

In 2018, online travel agency MakeMyTrip dropped Treebo from their listings which led to a major hit on their revenues. They had to lay off 70-80 employees. Treebo Hotel's losses jumped to ₹115 Crore (US$13.8 million) in 2018. But from August 2018, the company has managed to slash its cash burn by over 80 per cent and according to its Registrar of Companies (RoC) filings, Treebo aims to double its revenue growth and attain profitability by 2021. For this, Treebo added another source of income, Hotel Management CMS SuperHero, a SaaS platform to cater to hotels that are not Treebo branded, remove minimum guarantee for hotel owners, and as part of minimizing the cash burn. In July 2019, 100-120 employees were laid off following a failed fourth round of investment. The Hotel Superhero model that launched in August 2019 has over 300 properties across the country.

In October 2020, Treebo Hotels raised $6 million in its Series C funding round from its existing investors as bridge financing to continue its survival.
