= 2025 World Monuments Watch =

The World Monuments Watch is a flagship advocacy program of the New York–based private non-profit organization World Monuments Fund (WMF) that calls international attention to cultural heritage around the world that is threatened by neglect, vandalism, conflict, or disaster. After the 2022 World Monuments Watch selection process, the next iteration was delayed to 2025. Continuing on the two year-cycle for the program, the next selection will take place in 2027. The Moon was selected as a site in the 2025 World Monuments Watch List, making it the first time a site outside the Earth has been selected in this program.

== Selection process ==
Every two years, it publishes a select list known as the Watch List of Endangered Sites that are in urgent need of preservation funding and protection. The sites are nominated by governments, conservation professionals, site caretakers, non-government organizations (NGOs), concerned individuals, and others working in the field. An independent panel of international experts then select 100 candidates from these entries to be part of the Watch List, based on the significance of the sites, the urgency of the threat, and the viability of both advocacy and conservation solutions. For the succeeding two-year period until a new Watch List is published, these 100 sites can avail grants and funds from the WMF, as well as from other foundations, private donors, and corporations by capitalizing on the publicity and attention gained from the inclusion on the Watch List.

== 2025 Watch List ==
The 2025 Watch List nominations were due by 5 pm EDT on March 15, 2024. More than 200 nominees were submitted. Twenty five sites were selected to be included in the list, announced on January 15, 2025. These sites were chosen from 29 countries across five continents and the Moon. This is the first time that a WMF Watch site has been selected in the Moon (and outside the Earth).

Site	Image	Location
Barotse Floodplain Cultural Landscape		Western Province, Zambia
Belfast Assembly Rooms		Belfast, Northern Ireland, United Kingdom
Bhuj Historic Water Systems		Bhuj, Gujarat, India
Buddhist Grottoes of Maijishan and Yungang		Gansu and Shanxi Provinces, China
Chapel of the Sorbonne		Paris, Île-de-France, France
Chief Ogiamien’s House		Benin City, Edo, Nigeria
Cinema Studio Namibe		Moçâmedes, Namibe, Angola
Erdene Zuu Buddhist Monastery		Kharkhorin, Övörkhangai, Mongolia
Gaza Historic Urban Fabric		Gaza Strip, Palestine
Historic City of Antakya		Antakya, Hatay, Türkiye
Historic Lighthouses of Maine		Maine, United States
Jewish Heritage of Debdou		Debdou, Taourirt, Morocco
Kyiv Teacher’s House		Kyiv, Ukraine
Monasteries of the Drino Valley		Gjirokastër County, Albania
Musi Heritage Revitalization Project		Hyderabad, Telangana, India
Noto Peninsula Heritage Sites		Ishikawa Prefecture, Japan
Qhapaq Ñan, Andean Road System		Argentina, Bolivia, Chile, Colombia, Ecuador, Peru
Ruins of Old Belchite		Belchite, Aragon, Spain
Serifos Historic Mining Landscape		Serifos, South Aegean, Greece
Swahili Coast Heritage Sites		Comoros, Kenya, Mozambique, Tanzania
Terracotta Sculptures of Alcobaça Monastery		Alcobaça, Portugal
The Great Trading Path		North Carolina, United States
The Moon		The Moon
Waru Waru Agricultural Fields		Acora District, Puno, Peru
Water Reservoirs of Tunis Medina		Tunis, Tunisia
