= Pullman Hotels and Resorts =

Premium hotel chain

- Company type: Subsidiary
- Industry: Luxury hotels
- Founded: 2007
- Headquarters: Paris, France
- Number of locations: 146
- Area served: Worldwide
- Parent: Accor
- Website: pullman.accor.com

Pullman Hotels and Resorts is a French multinational upscale hotel brand owned by Accor. Pullman has 146 hotels and resorts in 42 countries spread across Africa, the Americas, Asia, Europe, the Middle-East and Oceania.

== History ==
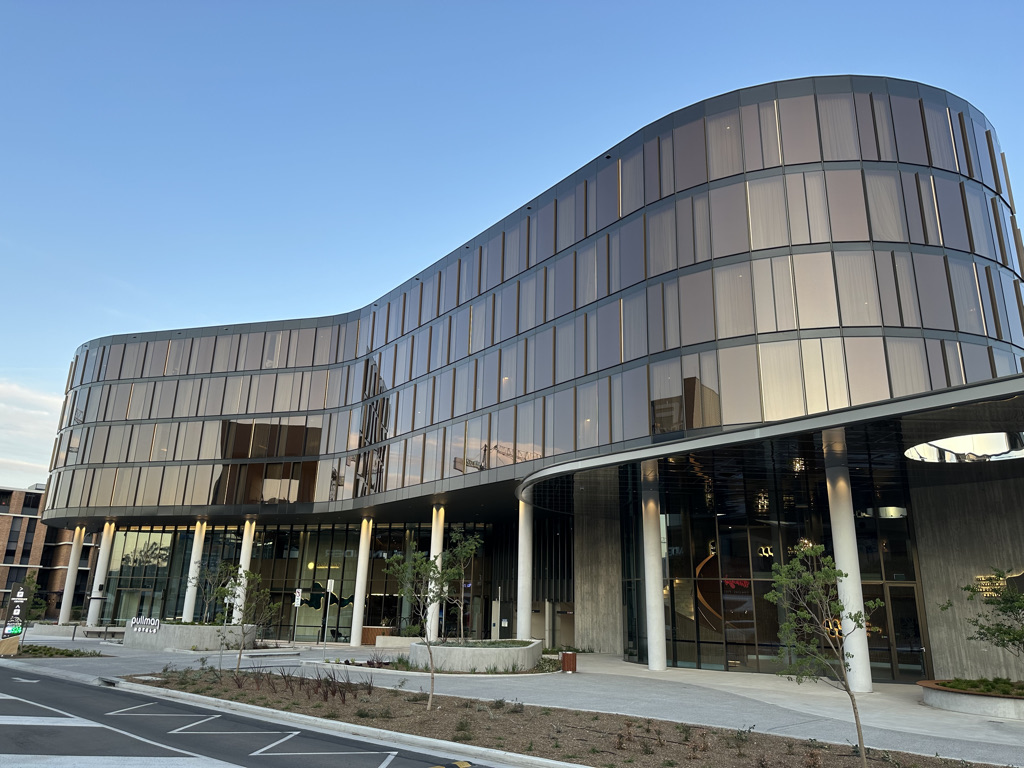
Pullman in Sydney

=== Railroad origins ===
The name Pullman was indirectly inspired by George Pullman (1831–1897), founder of the Pullman Company, a prosperous 19th-century, Chicago-based railroad manufacturer. The Pullman Company was famous for launching the first sleeping trains in the United States and developing upscale services for railroad travelers. Belgian Georges Nagelmackers (1845–1905) traveled to the United States in 1867-1868 and came back with the plan to build the equivalent of the Pullman Company in Europe, the Compagnie Internationale des Wagons-Lits (CIWL).

The fast-growing railroad networks led the rail industry to invest in the construction and management of hotels alongside railroad tracks. In 1894, the CIWL created the Compagnie Internationale des Grands Hotels to manage its growing collection of hotels worldwide, which included the Hôtel Terminus in Bordeaux and Marseille, the Pera Palace Hotel in Istanbul, the Hôtel de la Plage in Ostend, and the Grand Hôtel des Wagons-Lits in Beijing. 30 years later, the CIWL introduced the Pullman wagons in Europe, which were designed for upscale leisure traveling. The Pullman brand became so popular that CIWL's top hotels were turned into Pullman Hotels.

=== 15-year hiatus, 2007 revival ===
In June 1990, the AccorHotels group bought a minority stake in CIWL. After fully acquiring CIWL in 1991, AccorHotels turned all Pullman Hotels into Sofitel Hotels in 1993, thus taking the Pullman brand off the market.

In 2007, AccorHotels revived the Pullman name as an upscale hotel brand to cater to business travelers; this was both a reorganizing of some existing hotels as building new ones.

The 24-storey Pullman Dubai Mall of the Emirates (MoE) Hotel, the first of Pullman's properties in the Middle East, opened in 2010. Its fourth property in the region, the Pullman Dubai Jumeirah Lakes Towers, opened in 2015. In 2012, Pullman Hotels announced 12 openings in Indonesia within 5 years, opened its first property in the UK (the Pullman London St Pancras) and in Vietnam, and China became its biggest market. By 2013, Pullman had opened 79 properties, half of those located in the Asia-Pacific region.

=== Development since 2013 ===
In 2013, Pullman Hotels adopted a new visual identity. Pullman hotels adopted new staff uniforms, a new kitchen concept, newly designed interiors, and up-to-date technology upgrades. Accor also announced the plan to reach 150 Pullman Hotels and Resorts by 2020.

In 2014, the AccorHotels group announced its intent to double its Asia-Pacific portfolio with the opening of 47 new Pullman hotels in the region, 38 of those in China. That same year, the 338-room Pullman Shanghai South opened, making it the 15th Pullman property in China, and the 45th in Asia-Pacific. In 2015, the Sofitel Miami Airport was turned into a Pullman hotel, the first Pullman property in North America. By the end of 2015, 95 Pullman locations were opened. The first property of Pullman in Japan, the Pullman Tokyo Tamachi, opened in 2018.

In 2017, Pullman launched the Artist Playground program in Brussels, where every Pullman hotel independently looks for local talents to exhibit their art. The hotel managers and the art magazine Wallpaper took part in the curation process.

== See also ==
- Hôtel Terminus
