= Denis Hennequin =

French businessman

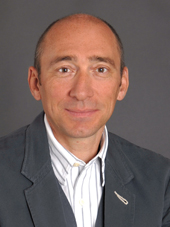
- Denis Hennequin, September 2011
- Born: June 8, 1958 (age 67); Paris, France
- Education: Panthéon-Assas University
- Occupation: Businessman

Denis Hennequin (born June 8, 1958) is a French businessman, entrepreneur and administrator, including past and current non executive director roles for John Lewis, Eurostar, SSP Group PLC, 1001fontaines (NGO), KellyDeli LTD, Picard (Chairman), Pret A Manger (NED) and Bakkavör Group Ltd.

== Education ==
In 1984, Hennequin graduated from law school. He earned a bachelor's degree in economics and a master's degree in Private International and Social Law from Panthéon-Assas University.

== Professional corporate career ==
=== McDonald's ===
In 1984, Hennequin began his career at McDonald's as Assistant Director of a Paris-based restaurant. After becoming Restaurant Manager, he moved on to numerous positions within the organization including Training & Recruitment Consultant, Field Service Consultant, Director of Franchising, Director of Operations and Regional Manager for Paris and surrounding suburbs.

In 1996, he became President and Managing Director of McDonald's France at a time when McDonald's in France was perceived as a symbol of globalization's negative effects. To counter this sentiment, Hennequin launched a successful "Born in the USA, made in France" public relations campaign, proclaiming that the franchises are French-owned, employ French people and use 80% French-produced products. He also dedicated resources into re-imaging 70% of the branches in France to better integrate the fast-food chain into the European context, incorporating hardwood floors, upholstery seating, attractive facades and even gas fireplaces. From July 2005 to November 30, 2010, he served as President of McDonald's Europe Limited and was responsible for 6,600 restaurants in 40 countries. He is the first non-American to hold the job of president of McDonald's Europe since the company's European implantation in 1971. By 2007, France became the highest grossing market for McDonald's after the USA.

=== Accor ===
He joined the Accor Board as its Independent Director in May 2009 and became Executive Director of Accor SA in December 2010 before assuming the role of CEO in January 2011. In September 2011, Hennequin unveiled plans to dynamize Accor's economy brands and introduced the Group's new signature "Open New Frontiers in Hospitality". He stepped down as CEO on April 23, 2013.

== Entrepreneurial career ==
=== The Green Jersey ===
In February 2014, he founded a consulting company, The Green Jersey, that he still leads today.

=== Cojean ===
From 2014 to 2016, he became a partner for Cojean International.

=== Board directorships ===
- Eurostar: non-executive director (NED) since 2012.
- John Lewis Partnership (John Lewis & Waitrose): NED from 2014 to 2017 and chair of the remuneration committee.
- SSP Group PLC: NED since 2014 - until April 2019.
- 1001fontaines (NGO): NED since 2014.
- Bakkavör Group Ltd: Senior Independent Director since 2017.
- KellyDeli: NED since 2019 and chairman since october 2020.
- Picard: chairman since November 2019.
- JDEP (Jacob's Coffe): NED since 2020.

=== French Food Capital ===
In 2017, he became founding partner of French Food Capital.

== Private life ==
Hennequin is considered by the media as an atypical businessman. He's fond of cycling and music. In 1978, he created Asbury Sound, the first Bruce Springsteen fan club in France.
