= Union des Français de l'Étranger =

French organisation

Logo of the Union des Français de l'Étranger

The Union des Français de l'Étranger (French Foreign Union), or UFE, is a French organisation. It was founded in 1927. It operates in over 80 countries. The purpose of the Union des Français de l'Etranger is to defend the rights of French people outside of France. It was the only organisation for foreign French people until 1980.
