= Paul Dubrule =

French businessman and politician

Member of the French Senate for Seine-et-Marne
- In office 28 November 1999 – 30 September 2004
- Preceded by: Alain Peyrefitte

Mayor of Fontainebleau
- In office 1992–2000

Personal details
- Born: 6 July 1934 (age 92) Tourcoing, France
- Party: RPR
- Education: University of Geneva
- Profession: Entrepreneur

Paul Dubrule (born 1934) is a French businessman and politician. He co-founded AccorHotels in 1967. He served as a member of the French Senate from 1999 to 2004, representing Seine-et-Marne.

In 2002, he established the École d'Hôtellerie et de Tourisme Paul Dubrule in Siem Reap, Cambodia. In 2012, he co-founded two new hotel chains with Olivier Devys, a former executive at Accor, called respectively Okko and Eklo.

The Rue Paul Dubrule in Lesquin was named in his honor in 2016. He was cited in the 2016 Panama Papers.
