= Sunparks =

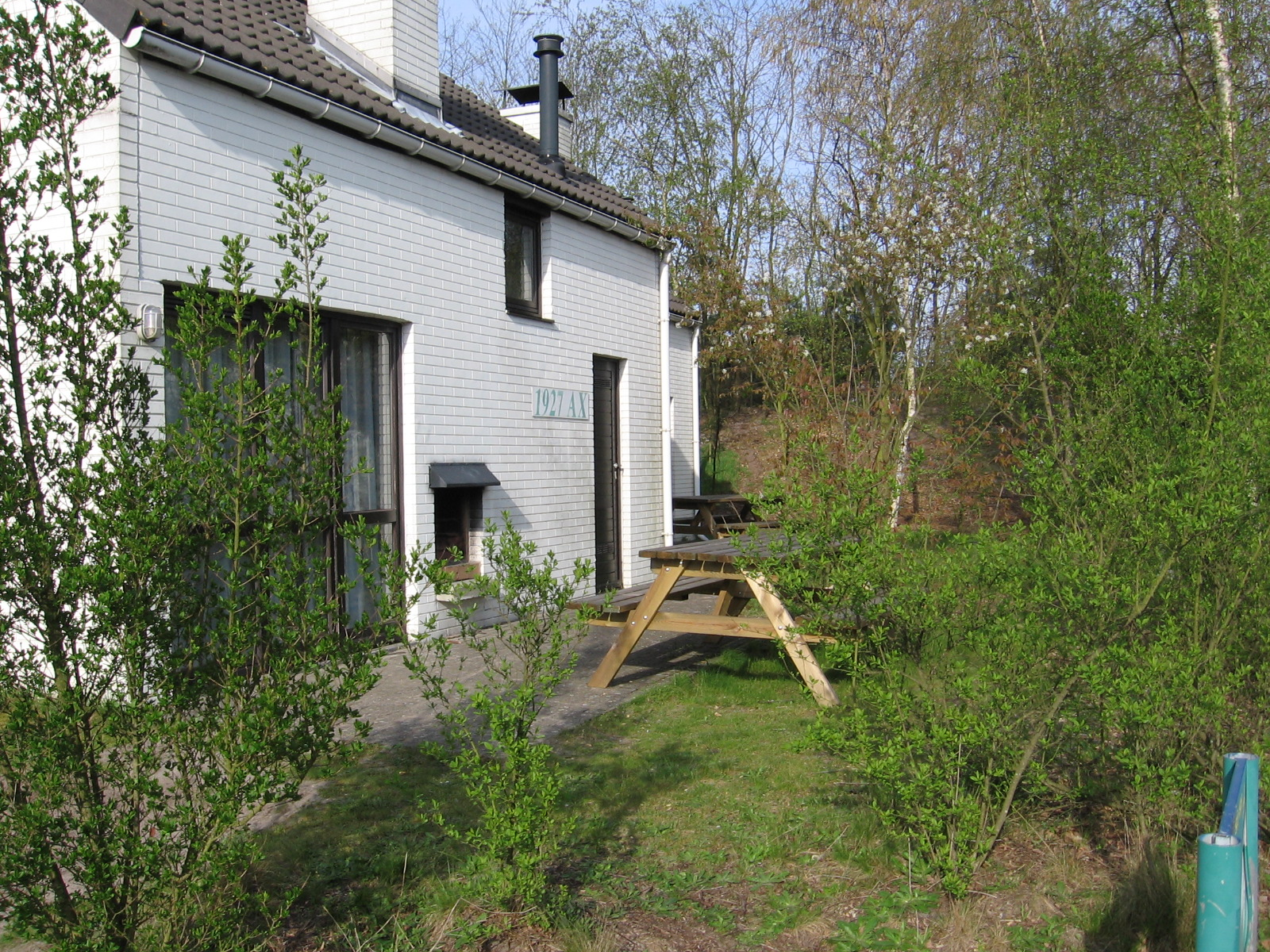
Connected villas at Sunparks Kempense Meren, the usual appearance of the villas at a Sunparks park.

Sunparks is a European Brand of Holiday Villages from Center Parcs Europe. Sunparks runs eight parks: four Belgian Parks, two Dutch Parks and two German Parks. In 2011 Sunparks will take over a third Dutch park from Landal Greenparks.

== History ==
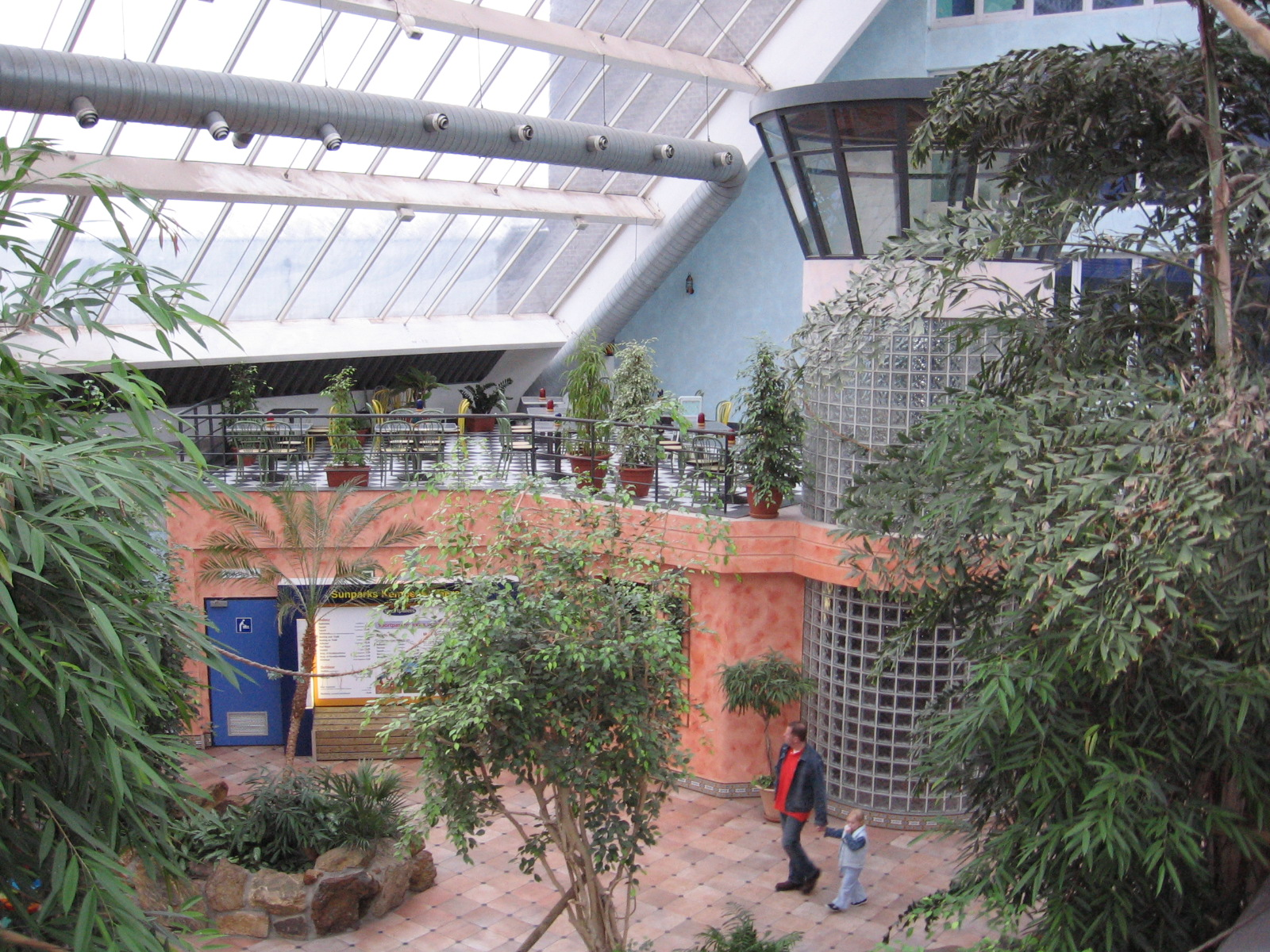
The parkcenter of Sunparks Kempense Meren.

In 1981 Sun International opened the first Park in Oostduinkerke, called Sunclub Groendijk. In 1987 they built a second park in De Haan which would get a covered park centre (based on the idea of Center Parks), so it was suitable for all climatic conditions. From this moment they decided to exploit the parks under the name Sunparks. Sunparks Groendijk was from now on called Sunparks Oostduinkerke and the new park got the name Sunparks De Haan. In 1992 a third park followed in the Ardennes, Sunparks Vielsalm, and because of its success followed a fourth park in 1994, Sunparks Rauwse Meren. The director of Sunparks first wanted to let Sunparks grow to 10 parks, but he did not succeed because of financial difficulties. In 1997 Sun International was sold, and the Sunparks brand was taken over by Mark Vanmoerkerke. In 2006 Roompot Holidays went into negotiations with Sunparks, to buy the brand, but they did not succeed and after all Pierre et Vacances (the owner of Center Parcs Europe) bought the Sunparks brand in 2007. On 13 November 2008 Center Parks Europe announced that they would continue with a two-brand-strategy: Center Parcs and Sunparks. This was an easy decision because Sunparks was inspired on Center Parcs. Center Parcs would contain the 5 star parks, and Sunparks would contain the 3 and 4 star parks. This meant that since 29 January 2009 the parks Loohorst, Zandvoort, Heilbachsee and Butjardinger Küste would be rebranded as Sunparks parks. At the beginning of 2011 the company decided to rename most of the Sunparks back into Center Parcs with only three Parks in Belgium remaining under the brand Sunparks. On 4 January 2013 Center Parcs changed De Haan again to 'Sunparks De Haan aan zee'. According to the press release the brand name 'Center Parcs' created wrong expectations and the guests named the park 'Sunparks' anyway. Since then Sunparks again consists of the original 4 parks bought by Pierre & Vacances in 2007.

== All Resorts ==
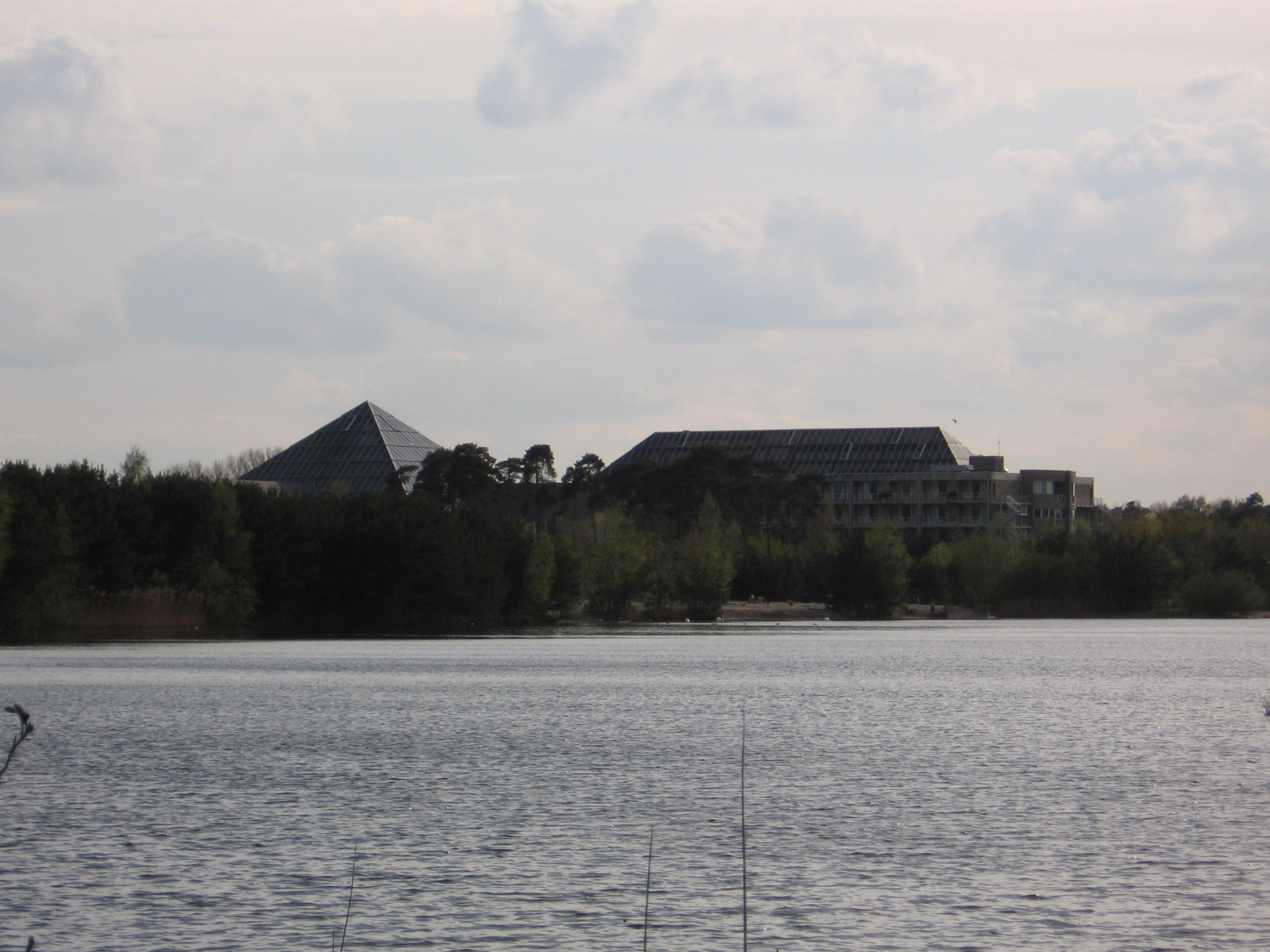
Sight on the parkcenter from the other side of the Rauwse lake at Sunparks Kempense Meren.

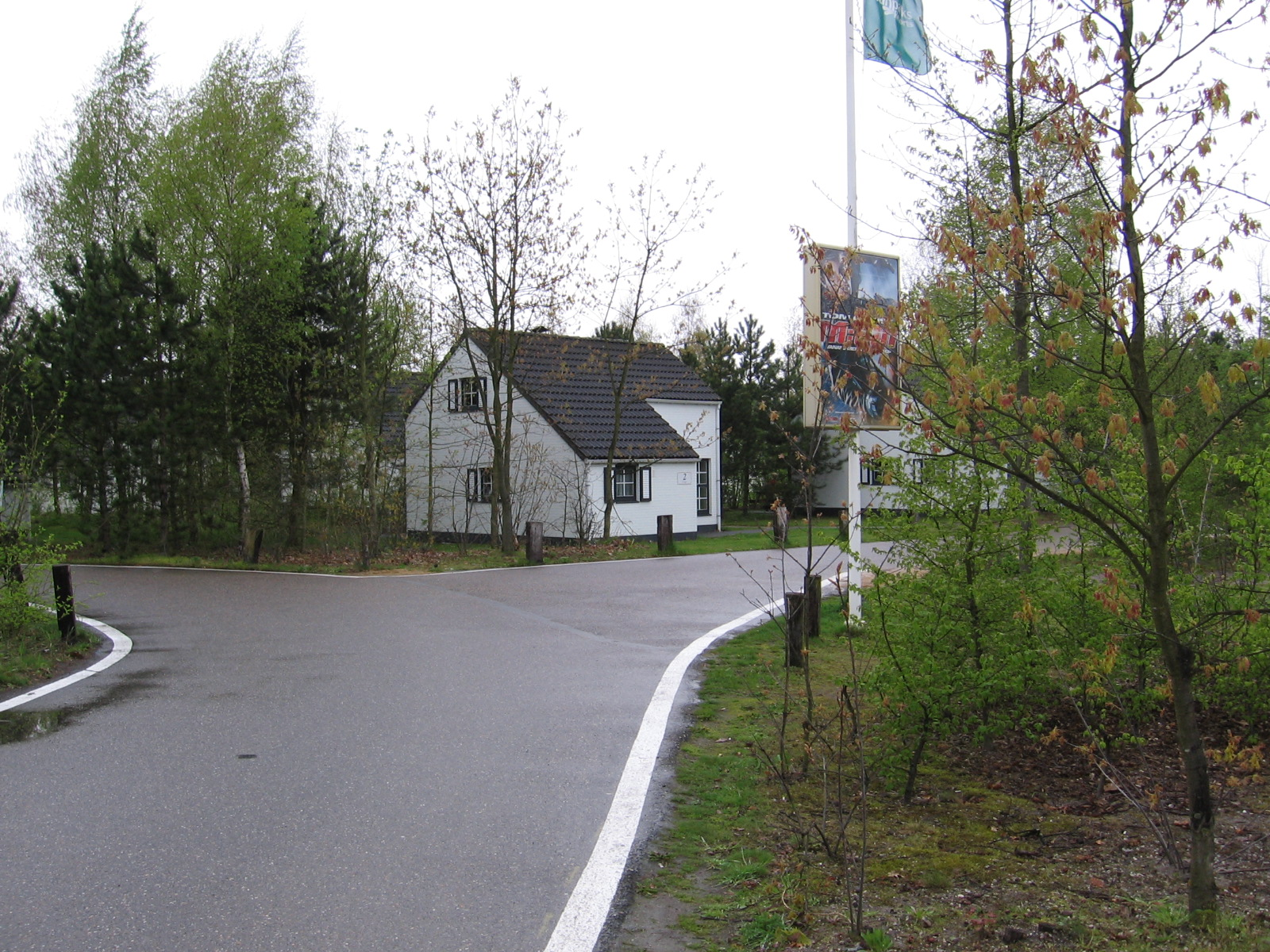
Cottage at a roundabout, near the reception of Sunparks Kempense Meren.

Country	Resort	City / Village	Region/County	Year opened	Added to portfolio	Removed from portfolio	Old name
Belgium	Sunparks Oostduinkerke aan zee	Oostduinkerke	West Flanders	1981	-		Sunparks Oostduinkerke
Belgium	Sunparks De Haan aan zee	De Haan	West Flanders	1989	-	2011-2013	De Haan
Belgium	Sunparks Ardennen	Vielsalm	Ardennes	1992	-		Sunparks Vielsalm
Belgium	Sunparks Kempense Meren	Mol	Antwerp	1994	-		Sunparks Mol
No longer in portfolio
Netherlands	Sunparks Limburgse Peel	America	Limburg	1980	2009	2011	Center Parcs Park Loohorst
Netherlands	Sunparks Zandvoort aan zee	Zandvoort	North Holland	1989	2009	2011	Center Parcs Park Zandvoort
Netherlands	Sunparks Sandur Drenthe	Emmen	Drenthe	1999	2011	2011	Landal parc Sandur
Germany	Sunparks Eifel	Gunderath	Rhineland-Palatinate	1979	2009	2011	Center Parcs Park Heilbachsee
Germany	Sunparks Nordsee Küste	Tossens	Lower Saxony	1992	2009	2011	Center Parcs Butjadinger Küste
Germany	Sunparks Bostalsee	Bostalsee	Saarland	2013	-	-	

== Expansion ==
In 2011 Sunparks was developing a German park in Bostalsee which would be called Sunparks Bostalsee, this park opened July 2014 under the Center Parcs brand.
