= Center Parcs =

Center Parcs may refer to:

- Center Parcs UK and Ireland, a short-break holiday company based in the United Kingdom and Ireland
- Center Parcs Europe, a short-break holiday company based in continental Europe
