= Center Parcs UK and Ireland =

Holiday village company

Center Parcs Limited
- Formerly: Center Parcs UK
- Type: Private
- Industry: Hospitality and Leisure
- Founded: 1987 (first UK village); 2001 (separation from Center Parcs Europe)
- Headquarters: New Ollerton, England, UK
- Number of locations: 6 villages UK 5 +1 Planned, Ireland 1
- Area served: United Kingdom and Ireland
- Key people: Colin McKinlay (CEO); Martin Dalby (chairman)
- Brands: Center Parcs; Aqua Sana
- Services: Short breaks; Family holidays; Leisure activities
- Revenue: £500.0m (2024)
- Operating income: £123.1m (2024)
- Net income: £67.1m (2024 pretax)
- Number of employees: 9,256 (2024)
- Parent: BGRE
- Center Parcs UK and Ireland locations (*In Development)
- Website: Center Parcs UK and Ireland

Center Parcs UK and Ireland (formerly Center Parcs UK) is a short-break holiday company that operates six holiday villages in the United Kingdom and Ireland, with each covering about 400 acres (1.6 km^{2}) of woodland. The company's first village opened near to Sherwood Forest, Nottinghamshire, in 1987 and its sixth, at Longford Forest, Ireland, opened in 2019.

A similar enterprise, Center Parcs Europe, operates in continental Europe; the two companies have been separately owned since 2001.

== History ==
=== Beginnings ===
In 1968, Dutch entrepreneur Piet Derksen purchased woodland near Reuver so that staff and customers of his 17 store sporting goods chain could relax in small tents. The park, De Lommerbergen was successful and tents were quickly replaced by bungalows or chalets.

In July 1987, Center Parcs opened its first UK resort named Center Parcs Sherwood Forest, in North Nottinghamshire. At that time, "Center Parcs" (under that name, with no regional qualifier) was a single global company owning both British and continental European resorts. In 1989 it opened its second village in the UK at Elveden Forest. Center Parcs (including the Sherwood Forest and Elveden Forest villages) was bought in 1989 by (the now defunct) Scottish & Newcastle. In 1994 it opened its third village in the UK, Longleat Forest, located west and southwest from the first two and near Longleat Adventure & Safari Park.

=== Independence ===
After acquiring the Whinfell Forest village, formerly Oasis Lakeland Holiday Village, and during a move in 2001 to concentrate on their core brewing business, Scottish and Newcastle sold the UK side of Center Parcs to venture capitalists Deutsche Bank Capital Partners, and it became a separate company known then as Center Parcs UK. The remainder of Center Parcs continued to operate, becoming known as Center Parcs Europe. The two companies have since operated under very similar branding, but are now owned and operated by two distinct companies. (In 2003 S&N sold Center Parcs Europe to a joint venture of France-based Pierre & Vacances (P&V), who already owned the competing Gran Dorado Resorts, and German investment group DBCP, hence completing the divesting of Center Parcs from the restructured S&N.)

In December 2003, Mid Ocean agreed to sell the UK resorts to Arbor Ltd for £285 million, a special vehicle set up to float Center Parcs UK on London Stock Exchange's Alternative Investment Market, and in 2005 it moved to the main stock market listing.

In May 2006 Center Parcs UK Group PLC was sold to The Blackstone Group for a reported £1.1 billion. In June 2015, it was announced that Blackstone had agreed to sell the company to Canadian-based Brookfield Properties for £2.4bn. At the time Center Parcs UK employed around 7,500 people and received around 2 million guests in 2015.

== Locations ==
Center Parcs has short-break holiday villages in five locations in the UK, with a sixth in Ireland which opened in 2019. Each village covers around 400 acres (1.6 km^{2}) of woodland, with a standard set of facilities, and have around 97% occupancy annually.

| Country | Resort | Nearest city or town | Nearest motorway/highway junctions at nearby areas | County | Year opened | Notes |
|---|---|---|---|---|---|---|
| United Kingdom | Sherwood Forest | Mansfield, Newark-on-Trent and Worksop | M1; J27, 28 & 29 Nottinghamshire, Derbyshire & South Yorkshire | Nottinghamshire | 1987 | First site opened outside continental Europe and first site off the M1 motorway. |
| United Kingdom | Elveden Forest | Brandon, Elveden and Thetford | M11; J8, 9, 9A & 10 Essex & Cambridgeshire | Suffolk | 1989 | Closed between 2002 and 2003 following a major fire. |
| United Kingdom | Longleat Forest | Warminster and Frome | M4; J17 & 18 Wiltshire, North East Somerset & South Gloucestershire | Wiltshire | 1994 | The only site to have a land train service, originally using Land Rovers. |
| United Kingdom | Whinfell Forest | Carlisle and Penrith | M6; J39, 40 & 41 Lancashire & Cumbria | Cumbria | 2001 | Opened in 1997 but operated by The Rank Group as Oasis Forest Holiday Villages. |
| United Kingdom | Woburn Forest | Ampthill, Flitwick and Woburn Sands | M1; J12 & 13 Bedfordshire | Bedfordshire | 2014 | The most recent village to open in the UK and second site off the M1 motorway. |
| Ireland | Longford Forest | Ballymahon | N55; Goldsmith Way Turnoff | County Longford | 2019 | First site opened outside the UK. |

=== Sherwood Forest ===
The first Center Parcs holiday village in the United Kingdom was opened in July 1987. It is located in 400 acres (1.6 km^{2}) of woodland near Sherwood Forest, Nottinghamshire. The site was formerly owned by the Forestry Commission, and was chosen as it was "pretty central [in the UK], it had the right maturity of trees and was in an area affected by the demise of the coal industry".

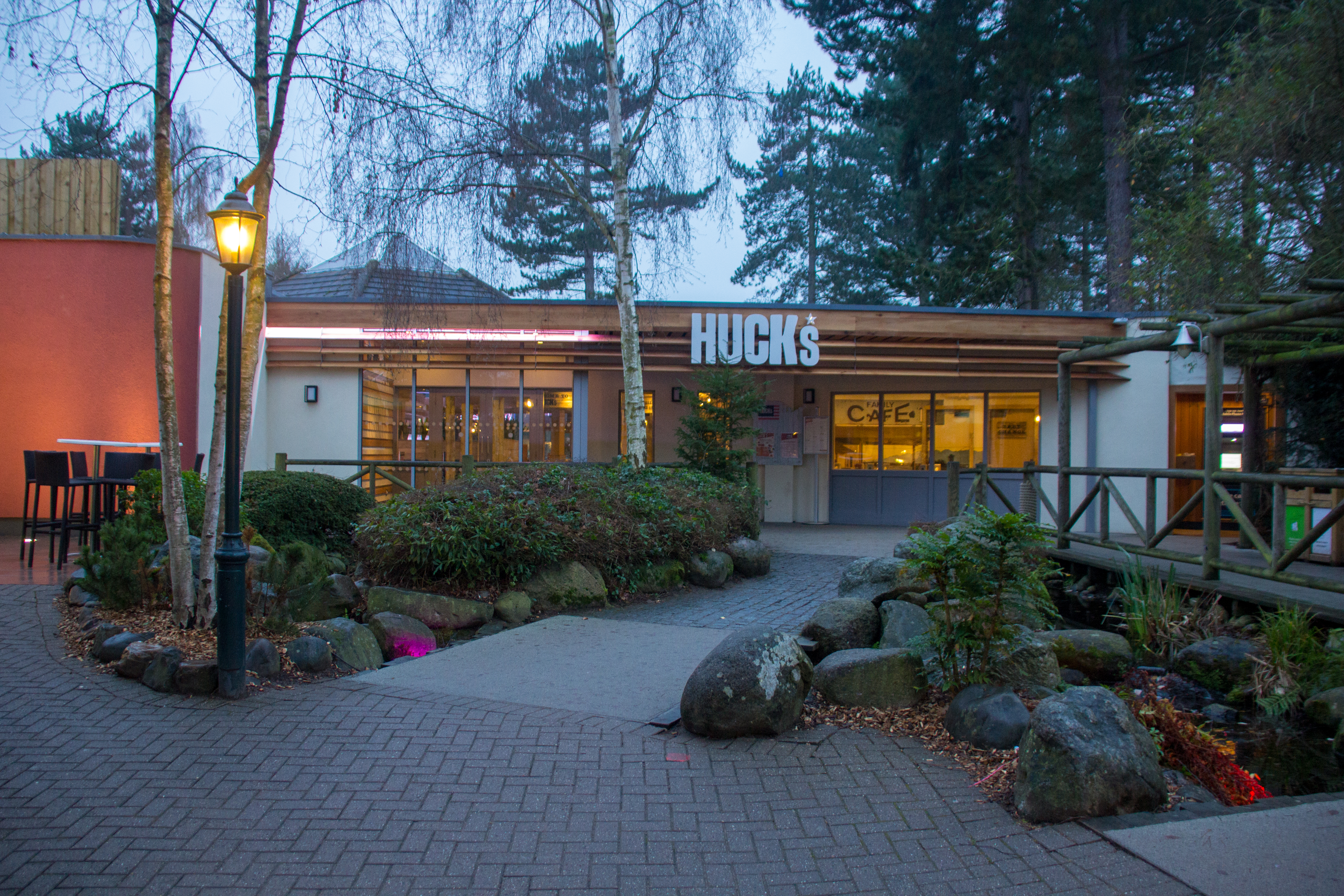
Hucks Café at Sherwood Forest

By 2012 it was receiving around 400,000 visitors annually, mostly from outside of Nottinghamshire. It can have around 4,000 visitors at any one time. The occupancy rate was over 90% in the first 30 years of operation.

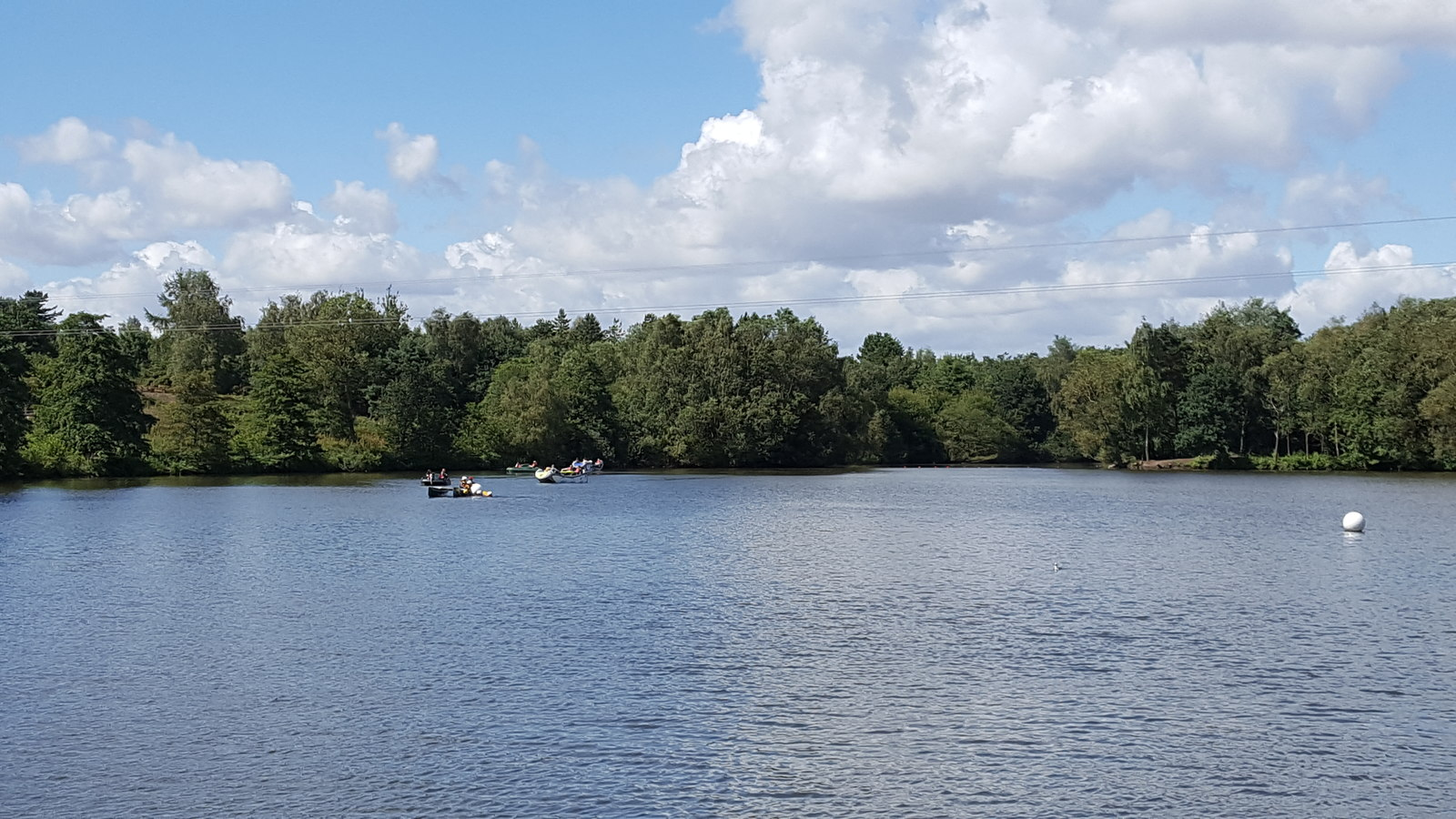
The boating lake at Sherwood Forest

A £3 million refurbishment of the Aqua Sana spa finished in April 2017, and a £15 million refurbishment of the Subtropical Swimming Paradise swimming facilities at the village started in September 2017. The village employs 1,500 people, of which around 700 are housekeepers.

The site originally had 609 lodges, which increased to 900 by the end of 2017. It has a mixture of Woodland Lodges, New Woodland Lodges, Executive Duplex Lodges, Penthouse Duplex Lodge, Executive Apartment, Executive Lodge, New Executive Lodge, and Treehouses, with between one and four bedrooms in each. Three luxury Treehouses were opened in 2010, each with four bedrooms. A six-bedroom Woodland Lodge was opened in 2017, along with 27 other woodland lodges.

There is a watersports lake near the Village Square, where craft hired from the Boathouse may be used.

=== Elveden Forest ===
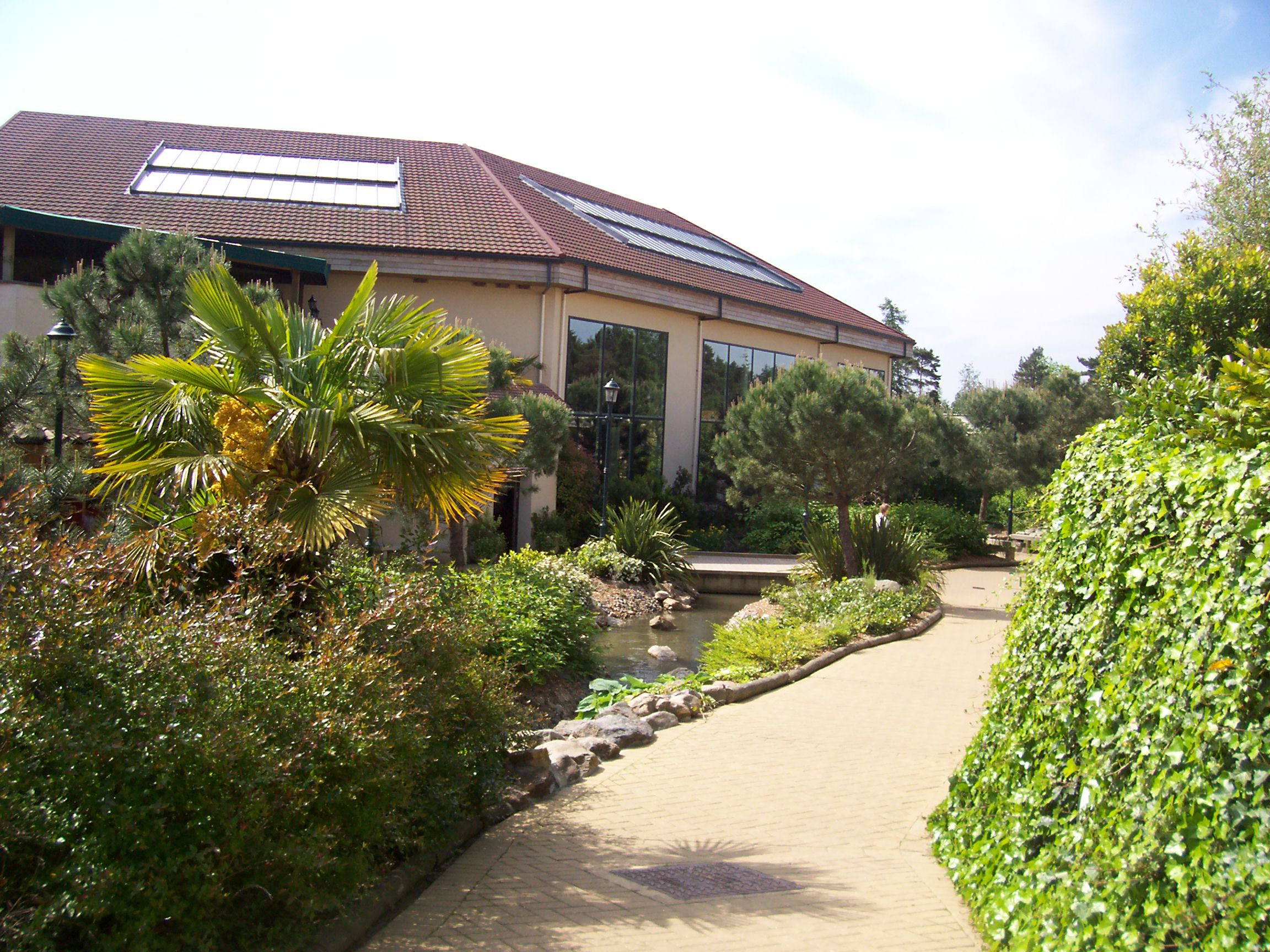
Elveden Forest Village Square South

Two years later, in 1989, a second village was added, at Elveden Forest. It makes up a small area of Thetford Forest west of the B1106 road and near the town of Brandon in Suffolk, England. It is named after the nearby village of Elveden.

Just before 10am on 4 April 2002 a major fire destroyed the central Plaza and sports centre of Elveden Forest. One member of staff was treated for smoke inhalation, but there were no serious injuries. The fire also destroyed seven bars and restaurants, a disco, some gift shops, a sports centre and a bowling alley. The damage to the forest was minimal. A subsequent inquiry found that the blaze was caused by contractors carrying out repair work on the roof of a catering block adjacent to the Plaza.

Elveden Forest re-opened in July 2003 after a major re-design, less susceptible to the potential spread of fire. The most dramatic difference was to the village square which was rebuilt with an open-air Mediterranean theme. The sub-tropical swimming paradise re-opened having survived the blaze; the sauna complex was changed to a Balinese theme, and a new Sports Plaza was opened. Whilst it was closed, the rest of the village was also improved including the refurbishment of the country club and the addition of a spa and new three- and four-bedroom lodges.

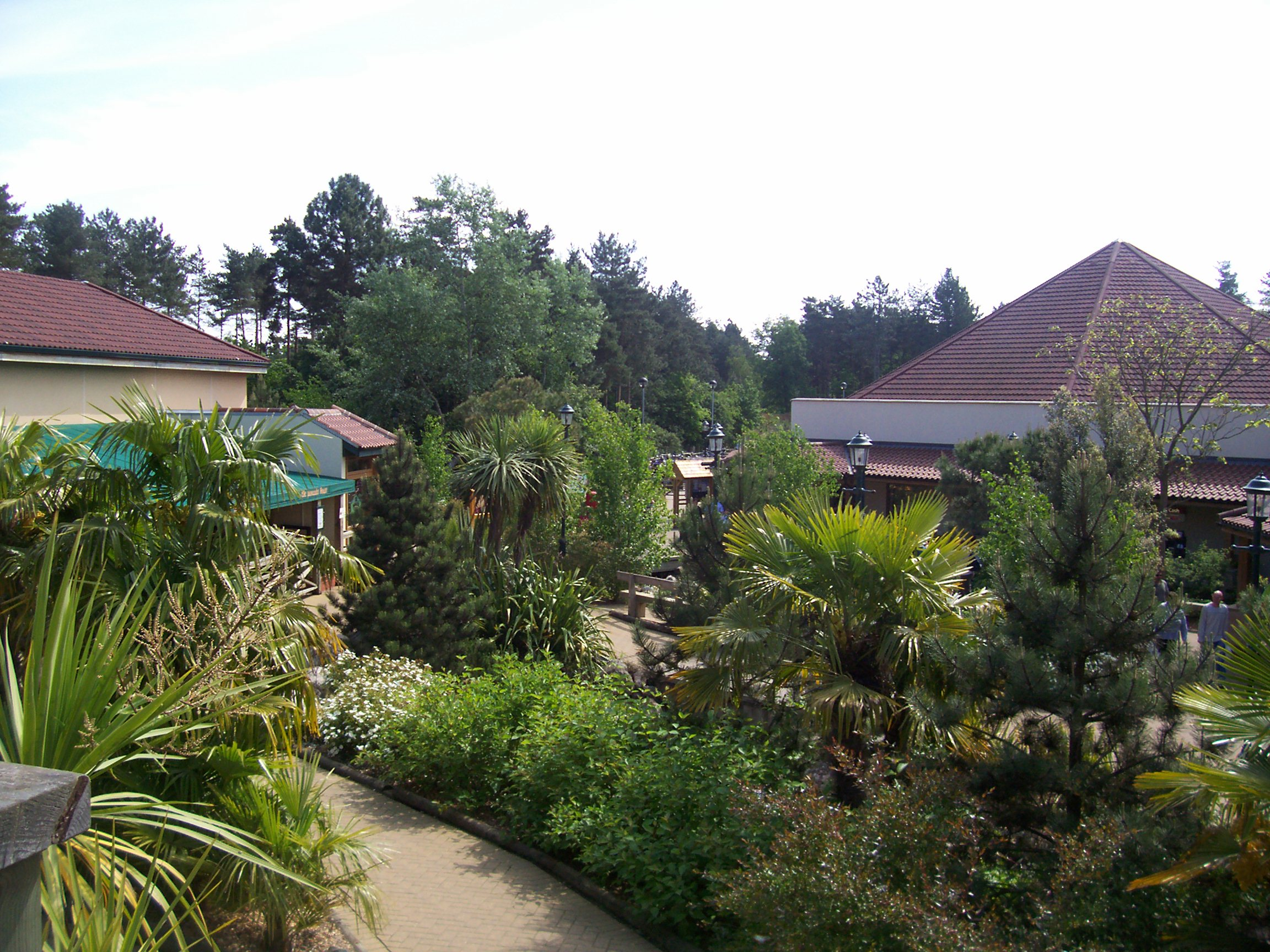
Elveden Forest Village Square North

Elveden Forest has a total of 866 units of accommodation which range from 'Woodland' grade to exclusive villas and include rooms at the Lakeview Hotel. These villas and rooms can accommodate up to 4,216 guests. Villas are located in six different areas with each area mostly including every type of accommodation, but the Ash and Oak areas are predominantly made up of executive and exclusive villas. Ash was extended in 2007 to include new four-bedroom two-storey villas.

=== Longleat Forest ===
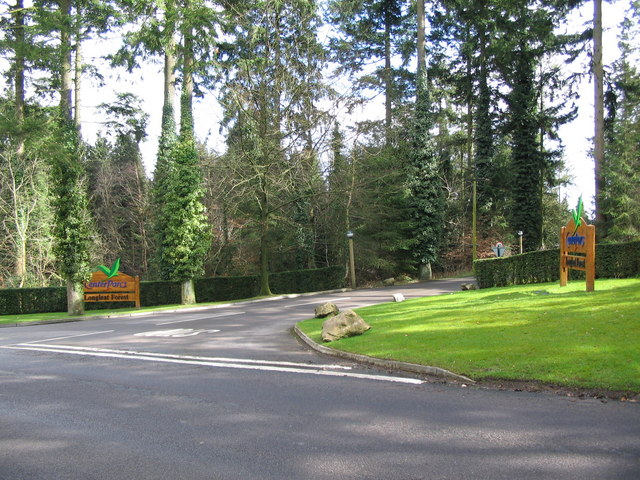
Main entrance to the Center Parcs resort in Longleat Forest

The third village opened in 1994. It makes up a large area of Longleat Forest in the county of Wiltshire, England, and is co-located on the site of Longleat Safari Park nearby, approximately five miles (8 km) east of Frome, Somerset, under 20 miles northwest of Shaftesbury, Dorset and a few miles west of Warminster. This village has fewer lodges than Elveden Forest and Sherwood Forest due to the steep topography of the site.

=== Whinfell Forest ===
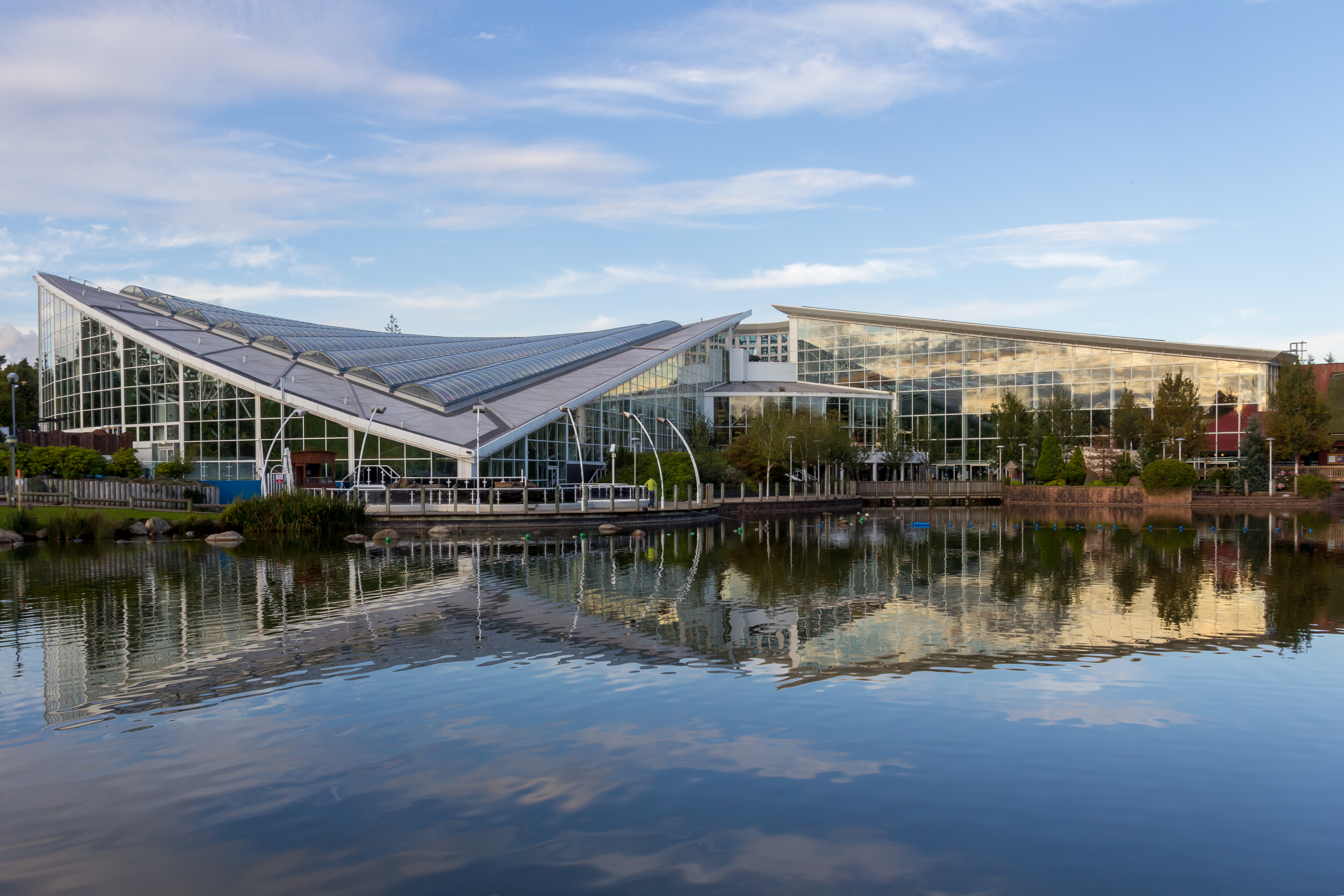
Main Plaza Dome building at Whinfell Forest

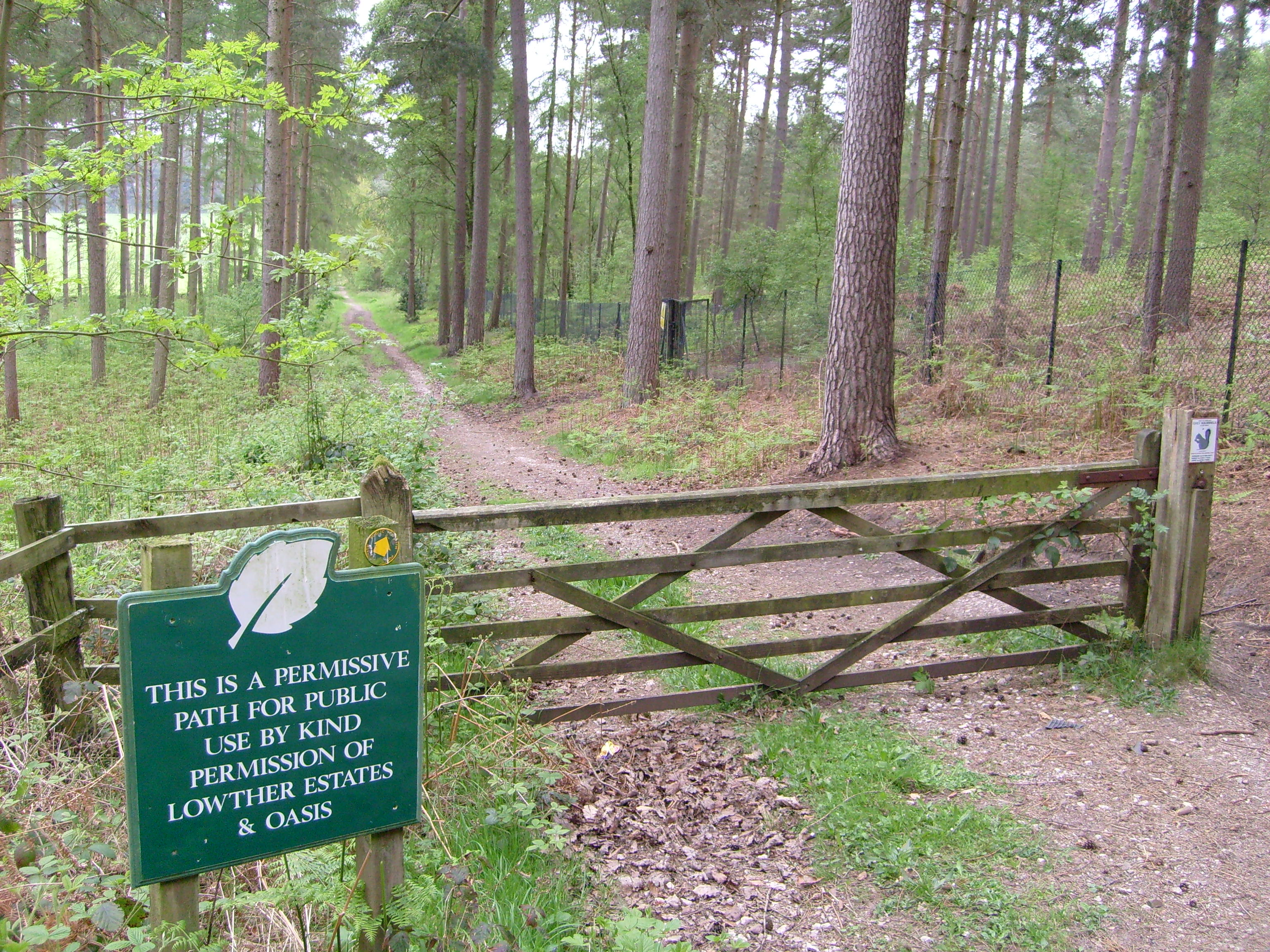
Footpath along outer edge of Whinfell Forest boundary fence

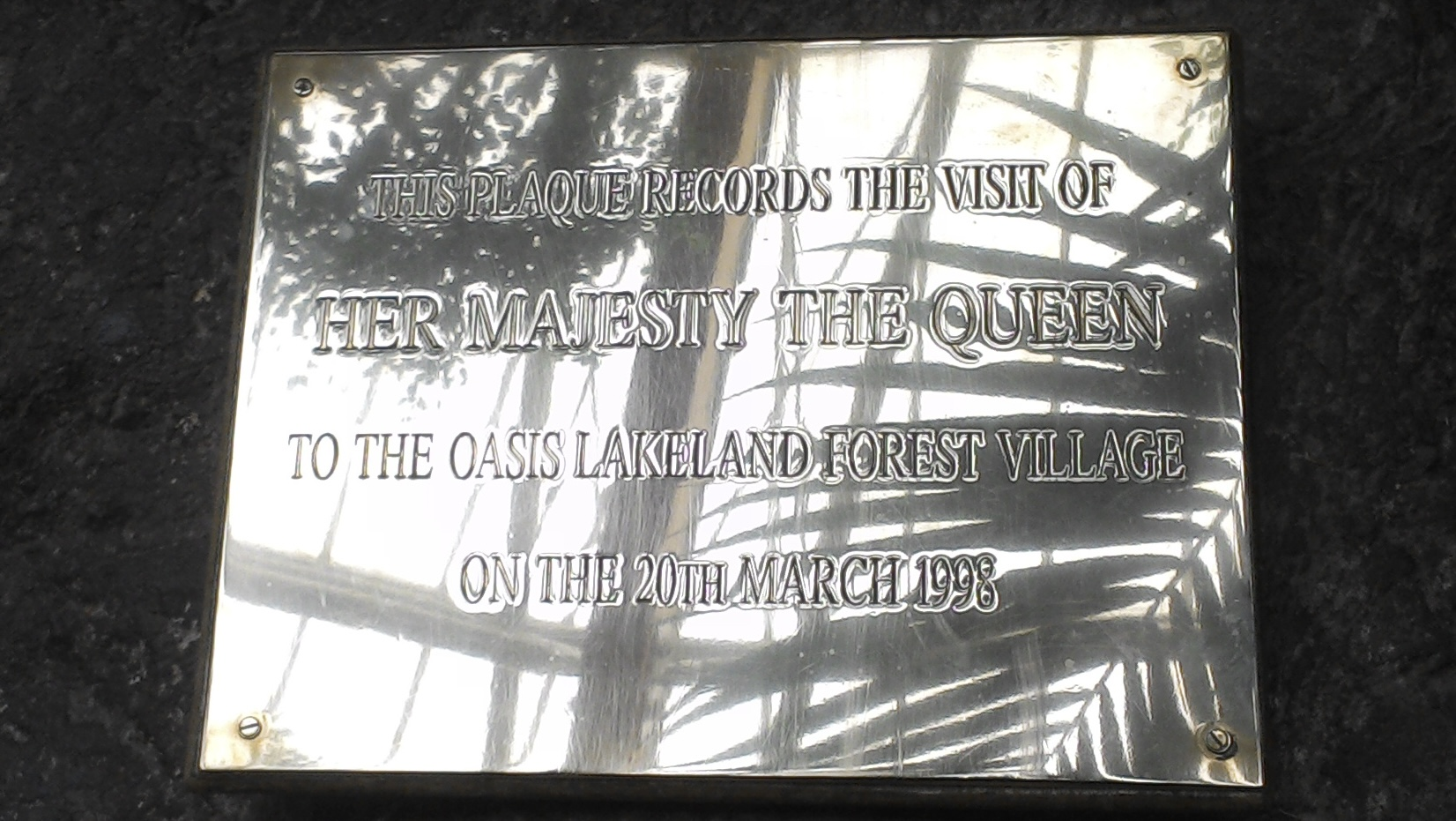
Recording the 1998 visit of Elizabeth II to the Oasis Lakeland Forest Village

In 1997, The Rank Organisation started a new company under the name of Oasis Forest Holidays Villages and opened a 'Centre Parcs' style holiday village in Whinfell Forest near Penrith, Cumbria, under the name Oasis Lakeland Holiday Village, which featured commercial restaurants and businesses such as Burger King and a Hard Rock Cafe. Bought by Center Parcs UK in 2001, who removed the commercial ventures, the site was rebranded as Center Parcs Oasis Whinfell Forest, before 'Oasis' was dropped from the name in 2006. The set up at Whinfell is slightly different in that the style of accommodation is more akin to two-storey Scandinavian-style lodges, the main centre of the village is under cover, and there is no country club like at Longleat Forest, Elveden Forest and Sherwood Forest. Center Parcs have updated many Whinfell Forest lodges, and added new lodges of an identical style at their other UK villages.

Whinfell Forest is the largest of Center Parcs' five UK holiday villages, with accommodation for 4,668 people in 861 units.

=== Woburn Forest ===
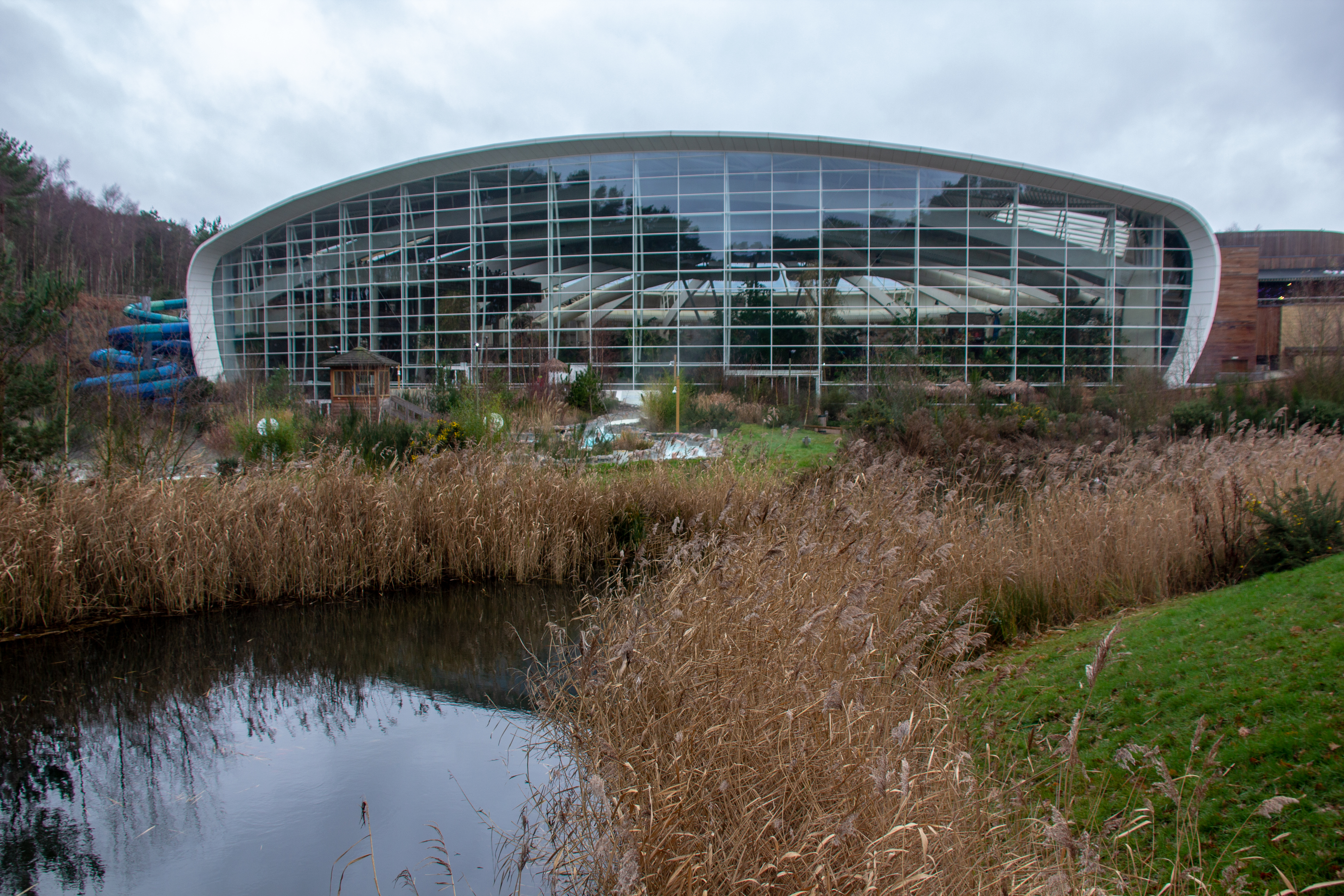
Plaza Dome building at Woburn Forest

Center Parcs Woburn Forest is located on the outskirts of Flitwick and Ampthill, 7–8 miles (11–13 km) from the village of Woburn in Bedfordshire in the UK. It commenced operation in July 2014 and hence it became the second Center Parcs resort off of the M1 motorway (the first being Center Parcs Sherwood Forest).

The chief executive, Martin Dalby, said that the company might add a fifth village. In December 2004, Center Parcs UK announced that it had identified a location named Warren Wood near Flitwick at Woburn, Bedfordshire. Despite the land being designated as greenbelt, the company sought planning permission and had already completed the signing of a lease on the land from its owner, the Duke of Bedford. The project was expected to cost approximately £160 million, including the construction of accommodation, indoor and outdoor facilities, the sub-tropical swimming complex, restaurants and a spa, but this has since risen to £230m. It was anticipated that, given planning permission, the project would take between three and four years to complete.

In July 2006, Bedfordshire District Council turned down Center Parcs' application for planning approval on the grounds that the project breached policy safeguarding Metropolitan Green Belt land, leading the company to lodge an appeal against the decision later that year. The inspector hearing the appeal recommended that the Council's decision be upheld. In September 2007 the council's decision was overturned by the government as Secretary of State Hazel Blears overruled the inspector's advice. She acknowledged that the scheme breached both local and national policies on safeguarding Green Belt, but argued that "in this particular case, the economic and employment benefits of the proposal, when taken together with the ecological and biodiversity benefits... constitute very special circumstances and are sufficient to clearly outweigh the harm to Green Belt", and granted outline planning permission. In November 2010 Center Parcs gained full approval for the plans of the village including designs of facilities, restaurants, shops and accommodation and in 2012 secured £250 million of investment to build the new resort, to be known as Woburn Forest.

Before Center Parcs could start construction, there were a number of planning conditions that had to be satisfied, most notably the improvement of local road junctions to allow smooth access to the Village. They also had to submit a local employment strategy, local purchasing policy and a forest and ecology management plan. This represents final approval of the detailed designs of buildings and landscape as well as local sourcing, employment strategies and green travel plan. The next stage of the project was the construction of a new roundabout, as well as the diversion of the public rights of way that cross the site.

It was built by Bowmer + Kirkland and was completed in spring 2014.

=== Longford Forest ===
In a 2008 interview, Martin Dalby, the chief executive of Center Parcs UK, stated that Woburn would be the last village the company constructed in the UK until Sussex and that if a sixth village was considered it would probably be located in Ireland. In September 2015, Center Parcs UK announced its intention to build a new site in County Longford, Ireland. Named Longford Forest, it opened in July 2019.

=== Future resort locations ===
==== Center Parcs Scottish Borders ====
In November 2024, the company announced plans for its first location in Scotland, near Hawick in the Scottish Borders and to be placed Northeast or North from Whinfell and South from the east end of the M8 Motorway. According to the company, the development would represent a £350m investment and could create up to 1,200 jobs. It plans to submit a planning application for around 700 lodges in 2025. The planning application was submitted to the Scottish Borders Council on 4 July 2025 and was approved in December 2025.

The plans were welcomed by the leader of the Scottish Borders Council, the chair of South of Scotland Enterprise and representatives of the Borders' tourism industry, respectively.

=== Cancelled resort locations ===
==== Sussex Forest Resort ====
In July 2021, the company announced its intention to construct a seventh resort located near Crawley and in the vicinity of Gatwick Airport near the M23 Motorway. These plans were scrapped in February 2023 following local environmental impact reviews but the company intended to find a suitable alternate site to build their seventh village which would still be placed East from Longleat and South from Woburn.

== Facilities ==
=== Accommodation ===
Each village has a number of different lodge types that range from one- to four-bedroom accommodation for up to 8 people, with Sherwood Forest recently opening 6-bedroom lodges for 12 people. Some larger lodges include their own games room and hot tub. Lodges are usually in small clusters and give a good degree of privacy, whilst allowing for self-catering and communal BBQs. Elveden Forest has no one-bed lodges, but instead includes the Lakeside View Hotel.

=== Amenities ===
Guests are able to book and participate in a wide range of activities at the various villages.

- Arrivals lodge – Guests are directed here for check-in from 10 am on their arrival day.
- Security lodge – Each village has a security lodge staffed 24 hours a day. Security staff help with directing traffic to the arrivals lodge, identifying all visitors to the village, staffing barriers, and assisting arrivals lodge staff on changeover days. They also staff the emergency phone number given to guests to call in the event of an emergency.
- Subtropical Swimming Paradise – The village swimming complex is known as the Subtropical Swimming Paradise and contains a wave pool, slides and chutes, an outdoor slide referred to as the Wild Water Rapids, outdoor pools, a 'lazy river', flumes, a children's pool and food outlets. Rides vary between villages. Since 2012, all locations have expanded their Subtropical Swimming Paradise complexes, involving a funnel slide called Tropical Cyclone, and two children’s splash parks called Venture Harbour and Venture Bay, with Venture Harbour aimed at older children, and Venture Bay directed to younger ones. Longleat, Longford and Woburn also have a slide called Typhoon, however Woburn's is different, as Longleat and Longford's Typhoon is a funnel slide, each containing two small funnels.
  - The first two expansions had slides manufactured by Proslide, with the remaining four have Van Egdom build the slides. Elveden and Woburn's Tropical Cyclones were Tornado 45s, and Woburn's Typhoon being a Pipeline. Sherwood, Elveden, Longleat and Longford's Tropical Cyclones were Cyclone 50s, and Longleat & Longford’s Typhoons were Crazy Cones.

| Resort | Location opened | Tropical Cyclone implemented |
|---|---|---|
| Sherwood Forest | 1987 | 2019 |
| Elveden Forest | 1989 | 2012 |
| Longleat Forest | 1994 | 2017 |
| Whinfell Forest | 2001 | 2023 |
| Woburn Forest | 2014 | |
| Longford Forest | 2019 | |

- Village Square/Plaza – The main hub of restaurants and shops as well as other facilities such as Guest Services and the medical centre.
- Sports Plaza/Jardin Des Sports – Contains most of the indoor sports facilities such as squash courts, badminton courts, pool and snooker tables, gymnasium, table tennis tables, golf simulators, indoor wall-climbing and an aerobics studio. There is also a themed restaurant, a sportswear shop and a newsagent.
- Boathouse – For all water-based activities on the lake including canoeing, fishing, pedalos, windsurfing, mini captains and raft building.
- Aqua Sana – The village spa includes various themed rooms as well as a central pool with hot tubs.
- Activity Den – The village crèche.
- Leisure Bowl and House of Games – A ten-pin bowling alley and coin-operated arcade games.
- Country Club – Contains additional restaurant and leisure facilities at some villages.
- Shops/Retail – Includes supermarket "ParcMarket", toy shop "JustKids", gift shop "The Store Room", sweet shop "Treats", swimwear equipment shop "Aquatique", the "Aqua Sana Spa Boutique", and clothing retailer Joules. Some shops are owned by Center Parcs, whilst the rest are operated by the Nuance Group. JustKids and The Store Room replaced "Funtastic" and "Natural Elements" respectively in 2012. Starbucks cafés were introduced to all UK villages in 2008. Center Parcs Longford Forest doesn’t have a Starbucks Café respectively. Longford Forest has its own café named the Coffee House.

=== Food and drink ===
More than twenty food and drink options are provided by external chains operated under concession and by internal brands.

=== Transport ===
Nearly all walk or cycle from place to place, with bikes available for hire at all parks. Longleat has a land train as well as everything else.

== Controversies ==
In September 2022, Center Parcs made the decision to close all of its UK locations for the funeral of Elizabeth II. This included moving all check-ins scheduled for Monday 19 September to the following day, and asking that all guests already present vacate the site by 10 am and not return until 10 am on Tuesday. The company later partially reversed this decision after widespread ridicule and derision by the UK media and customer complaints. It later clarified that guests may remain on site, but that they would be prevented from leaving their accommodation on the day of the funeral. This statement was later amended, with guests told they'd be able to walk around the sites on that date if they wished. However, guests due to arrive on the Monday were still to be denied access to the site, causing disruption to travel plans for many.
