= Gran Dorado =

Holiday villages company in the Netherlands

Gran Dorado Resorts
- Industry: Tourism
- Predecessor: Vendorado
- Founded: 1980: Vendorado; 1989: Gran Dorado
- Defunct: 2002
- Successor: Center Parcs
- Headquarters: Netherlands
- Number of locations: 40
- Area served: Belgium, Germany, Netherlands

Gran Dorado was a holiday villages company based in the Netherlands. Until the merger in 2002, it was the biggest holiday villages company of Europe. Today's owner is the French company Pierre et Vacances, and is merged with the Center Parcs company.

== History ==
Gran Dorado Resorts was originally found by the owner of the Dutch chain store company Vendex, known for the Vroom & Dreesmann company. Therefore, the first name of the company was Vendorado. Vendorado Leisure N.V. was founded in 1980, in 1989, the name was changed to Gran Dorado Lesure N.V.

At the beginning of 1996, the company had 6 big holiday villages. In the same year, Gran Dorado took over another Dutch holiday villages company, called Creatief Vakantieparken. The company immediately grew to a company with 40 holiday villages and around 7500 bungalows, and was by then the biggest holiday villages company of Europe. The two companies were operating 2 years under the name Gran Dorado/Creatief, in 1998 the company acquired the new name Gran Dorado N.V.

=== Merger with Center Parcs ===
At the beginning of 2002, Pierre & Vacances became the overall owner of the Gran Dorado company. Shortly after, P&V took over the Center Parcs-chain from Scottisch & Newcastle. By that time, the two largest holiday villages companies were in the same hands. Halfway through the year, Center Parcs and Gran Dorado merged. The Netherlands Competition Authority did not allow a merger with all 40 holiday villages, so the following was decided:

- 5 of the original Gran Dorado-villages will transfer to Center Parcs
- 1 original Gran Dorado-village will transfer to RP Holidays
- the remaining 34 villages, of which a large part belonged to Creatief Vakantieparken, will transfer to Landal Greenparks.

Note: when nothing is written in either the column "Today's owner" or "Today's name", then the name of owner and park is still the same as in the columns "Name after merger" and "Owner after merger". A * indicates that the holiday village was first owned by Creatief Vakantieparken.

Overview of all holiday villages of Gran Dorado
Country	Name	City	Region	Opening	Added to portfolio	Owner after merger	Name after merger	Present owner	Present name
Belgium	Gran Dorado Domaine de Chodes*	Malmedy	Luik	?	1996	Landal Greenparks	Landal Domaine de Chodes	Novasol Vakantieparken	Domaine de Chodes
Belgium	Gran Dorado Domaine Long Pré*	Stavelot	Ardennes	?	1996	Landal Greenparks	Landal Domaine Long Pré		
Belgium	Gran Dorado Village les Gottales*	Trois-Ponts	Ardennes	?	1996	Landal Greenparks	Landal Village les Gottales		
Germany	Gran Dorado Heilbachsee	Gunderath	Rhineland-Palatinate	1982	1984	Center Parcs	Center Parcs Park Heilbachsee	Sunparks	Sunparks Eifel
Germany	Gran Dorado Hochsauerland	Medebach	North Rhine-Westphalia	1994	1994	Center Parcs	Center Parcs Park Hochsauerland		
Netherlands	Gran Dorado Parc Sandur	Emmen	Drenthe	1999	1999	Landal	Landal park Sandur	Center parcs	Center parc Sandur
Netherlands	Gran Dorado Het Hart van Drenthe*	Zwiggelte	Drenthe	?	1996	Landal Greenparks	Landal Het Hart van Drenthe	Hogenboom Vakantieparken	Hogenboom Het Hart van Drenthe
Netherlands	Gran Dorado Het Land van Bartje*	Ees	Drenthe	?	1996	Landal Greenparks	Landal Het Land van Bartje		
Netherlands	Gran Dorado Hunerwold State	Wateren	Drenthe	?	1997	Landal Greenparks	Landal Hunerwold State		
Netherlands	Gran Dorado Ameland State*	Nes	Friesland	?	1996	Landal Greenparks	Landal Ameland State		
Netherlands	Gran Dorado Vitamaris*	Schiermonnikoog	Friesland	?	1996	Landal Greenparks	Landal Vitamaris		
Netherlands	Gran Dorado De Berkenhorst*	Kootwijk	Gelderland	1975	1996	Landal Greenparks	Landal De Berkenhorst		
Netherlands	Gran Dorado De Groene Heuvels*	Ewijk	Gelderland	?	1996	Landal Greenparks	Landal De Groene Heuvels	Hogenboom Vakantieparken	Hogenboom De Groene Heuvels
Netherlands	Gran Dorado De Veluwse Hoevegaerde	Putten	Gelderland	?	1997	Landal Greenparks	Landal De Veluwse Hoevegaerde		
Netherlands	Gran Dorado Klein Ruwinkel*	Scherpenzeel	Gelderland	?	1996	Landal Greenparks	Landal Klein Ruwinkel		
Netherlands	Gran Dorado Landgoed ’t Loo	Oldebroek	Gelderland	1997	1997	Landal Greenparks	Landal Landgoed ‘t Loo		
Netherlands	Gran Dorado Natuurdorp Suyderoogh*	Lauwersoog	Groningen	?	1996	Landal Greenparks	Landal Natuurdorp Suyderoogh		
Netherlands	Gran Dorado Aerwinkel*	Posterholt	Limburg	?	1996	Landal Greenparks	Landal Landgoed Aerwinkel		
Netherlands	Gran Dorado De Lommerbergen	Reuver	Limburg	1968	1997	Landal Greenparks	Landal De Lommerbergen		
Netherlands	Gran Dorado De Schatberg	Sevenum	Limburg	?	1997	Landal Greenparks	Landal Domein de Schatberg		
Netherlands	Gran Dorado Het Roekenbosch*	Blitterswijck	Limburg	?	1996	Landal Greenparks	Landal Het Roekenbosch		
Netherlands	Gran Dorado Loohorst	America	Limburg	1981	1981	CenterParcs	Center Parcs Park Loohorst	Sunparks	Sunparks Limburgse Peel
Netherlands	Gran Dorado Reevallis*	Vijlen	Limburg	?	1996	Landal Greenparks	Landal Reevallis		
Netherlands	Gran Dorado ‘t Vosseven*	Stramproy	Limburg	?	1996	Landal Greenparks	Landal ‘t Vosseven	eigen beheer	Bospark ‘t Vosseven
Netherlands	Gran Dorado Weeterbergen	Weert	Limburg	1985	1985	RP Holidays	Roompot Weeterbergen		
Netherlands	Gran Dorado De Vers*	Overloon	North Brabant	?	1996	Landal Greenparks	Landal De Vers		
Netherlands	Gran Dorado Duc de Brabant*	Diessen	North Brabant	?	1996	Landal Greenparks	Landal Duc de Brabant		
Netherlands	Gran Dorado Het Vennenbos*	Hapert	North Brabant	1970	1996	Landal Greenparks	Landal Het Vennenbos		
Netherlands	Gran Dorado Beach Park Texel*	De Koog	North Holland	?	1996	Landal Greenparks	Landal Beach Park Texel		
Netherlands	Gran Dorado Golf & Beach Resort Ooghduyne	Den Helder	North Holland	?	1999	Landal Greenparks	Landal Ooghduyne		
Netherlands	Gran Dorado Bosch en Zee*	De Koog	North Holland	?	1996	Landal Greenparks	Landal Bosch en Zee	Hogenboom Vakantieparken	Hogenboom Bosch & Zee
Netherlands	Gran Dorado Zandvoort	Zandvoort	North Holland	1989	1989	Center Parcs	Center Parcs Park Zandvoort	Sunparks	Sunparks Zandvoort aan Zee
Netherlands	Gran Dorado Beulaeke Haven*	Wanneperveen	Overijssel	?	1996	Landal Greenparks	Landal Beulaeke Haven	/	Waterpark Beulaeke Haven
Netherlands	Gran Dorado De Elsgraven*	Enter	Overijssel	?	1996	Landal Greenparks	Landal Landgoed de Elsgraven		
Netherlands	Gran Dorado De Vlegge*	Sibculo	Overijssel	?	1996	Landal Greenparks	Landal De Vlegge		
Netherlands	Gran Dorado De Witte Bergen	IJhorst	Overijssel	?	1997	Landal Greenparks	Landal De Witte Bergen		
Netherlands	Gran Dorado Resort Haamstede*	Burgh-Haamstede	Zeeland	? \	1996	Landal Greenparks	Landal Resort Haamstede		
Netherlands	Gran Dorado Villapark Livingstone*	Burgh-Haamstede	Zeeland	?	1996	Landal Greenparks	Landal Villapark Livingstone		
Netherlands	Gran Dorado De Koornmolen*	Zevenhuizen	South Holland	?	1996	Landal Greenparks	Landal de Koornmolen		
Netherlands	Gran Dorado Port Zélande	Ouddorp	South Holland	1990	1990	Center Parcs	Center Parcs Port Zélande		

== See also ==
- Center Parcs
- Landal Greenparks
