= Agnes (Russian sailing ship) =

1849 Russian sailing ship accident

History

Russian
- Name: Agnes
- Out of service: 19 December 1849
- Fate: wrecked north of De Koog, Texel, the Netherlands on 16 November 1849

General characteristics
- Draft: 17 ft (5.2 m)
- Crew: 21

Agnes was a Russian three-masted sailing ship, in Dutch sources stated as a full-rigged ship, during the first half of the 19th century. The vessel foundered on the shore of Texel, the Netherlands, in 1849 towards the end of a passage from New York City, United States, to Bremen, Germany.

== Fate ==
In late 1849 the ship with a draft of 17 feet (5.2 m) was on a voyage from New York City, United States to Bremen. There were officially 63 people onboard of which 41 passengers, but it is likely there were more people on board, up to 71, because women were not counted. The passengers on board were wealthy people who made a fortune in the United States and went back to Germany to visit family during Christmas time. The cargo of the ship contained wood and 400 barrels and baskets of tobacco. The captain of the ship was August Henrich Arensfeld.

On 19 December 1849, the ship ended up in a northwesterly storm. The crew adjusted the sails, however between 4am and 5am the ship became unmanageable and wrecked north of De Koog, Texel, at the level of pole (kilometre-interval beach mark) 22. The launch of their own lifeboat failed due to the heavy storm, the lifeboat broke and some crew members fell overboard. Due to the swirling water, crew had to climb the mast to stay out of the water.

== Rescue operation ==
People from De Koog went to Den Hoorn (1.5 hour) and to De Cocksdorp (2.5 hour) to call for lifeboats. The rowing boat from Decocksdorp arrived at 12:00 and the boat from Den Hoorn at 13:30. The first attempt of the boat from De Cocksdorp to board failed; and due to the storm the boat drifted away from the Agnes. The boat from Den Hoorn also failed to safe people. Eventually, the boat from De Cocksdorp managed to reach the boat successfully. It was described that were risking their own lives due to the bad weather to save the survivors. During the rescue attempt, the exhausted captain August Henrich Arensfeld fell into the water, but was still rescued. The captain together with some crew members were saved and brought ashore. After a three more trips a total of 19 people were saved including 7 passengers.

13 of the 22 crew members (including the captain), and 7 of the 41 passengers were rescued by the lifeboat from Cocksdorp. The rescue workers were named heroes and were all named in the newspaper being Jacob Buijs senior (1803–1864), Jacob Buijs junior (1832–1912), Cornelis Dalmeijer, Klaas Vlaming, Willem Stark, Gerrit Stark, Cornelis List, C. van Bommel and M. Bakker. Also the director of the lifeboat from Decocksdorp mr. de Konnigh was thanked.

Once ashore, the captain was offered help by two men of “Zunderdorp en compagnies” named as commissioners in maritime affairs for possible salvage of the ship and its cargo. One of them was a Russian Consular Agent living in Oudeschild.

In the days following, 60 barrels tobacco, 80 baskets tobacco and some parts of the ship were salvaged after washing ashore. Also bodies were washing ashore.

On 27 December 1849 the people who survived, except the captain, went with a boat via Grijpskerk, Oldenburg to Bremen.

== Beach robbery and persecution ==
Willem Bok was made responsible for collecting the ship and the goods that would wash ashore. Willem Bok was notary, subdistrict judge, beach finder, municipal secretary, and chief of police on Texel. Bok was of the fourth generation and an important person within the Dutch patrician Bok family.

On 20 December 1849 Bok wrote that the ship was completely gone and it was still uncertain how much of the cargo could be saved. The next month on 12 January 1850, captain Arensfeld, who still stayed in hotel “De Lindeboom”, wrote a letter to the state council governor. He asked him for clarification because in his view there was a failing policy of Bok and Bok was accused of theft of barrels of tobacco and passengers' property.

On fourteen handwritten sheets Bok described in detail how everything had gone in his view. In short wrote that on 19 December 1849, he sent 33 men with 13 flat carts up to a “2-hour walk” to either side of pole 22. Pickup up the goods continued in the following day, and the return was always done in consultation with the captain. The suitcases and boxes were examined by government officials before being returned to the captain on 21 December 1849. After 21 December 1849, cargo washed up along the entire coast, mainly tobacco. On these days there were as many as 200 people out day and night, hidden between the dunes, to pick up the loose tobacco leaves and personal items of the passengers. Bok indicated that he did not have enough people to counter this predation. In his sheets, Bok did not blame the captain's accusations. Bok believed that the letter was not written by the captain himself, but by someone who wanted to smear him; just like it would have been done a previous time. This person he does not mention by name, also lived in the same hotel as were the captain stayed (“De Lindeboom”).

On 24 December mayor Pieter Sijbrandsz Keijser had notes printed letting people know, not to go to the beach and that tough action would be taken against theft of items from the beach. The salvage work continued until the second week in January. On January 21, the goods were auctioned, and yielded a total of 10000 Guilders. Most was paid for the ship's carcass: 2525 Guilder.

A judicial investigation was launched in February 1849 to people who had robbed on the beach. The investigators wanted to search the houses of the suspects, but that was canceled due to the auction. The public prosecutor wrote that in the end there was little he could do, and asked the local authorities to continue the investigation. Three people who were caught during transport or resale of tobacco were fined. In the final report of 3 June 1950 it was stated that a total of twelve people were prosecuted. Eight were fined and four were acquitted due to lack of evidence. According to the officer the number was very low and said that this was partly because people did not want to betray each other.

== Number of people on board ==
The exact number of people on board is unknown. An official shipping statement from notary Ludivicus Kikkert, which was also signed by ten survivors, states 63 people: 42 passengers and 21 crew members. According to Kikkert 19 people were rescued: 12 crew members and 7 passengers, and so 44 would have died. A later interview of rescue worker Jacob Buys states the same numbers. However, according to the skipper there were 71 people on board. Also, a total of 49 death certificates have been found in the national register. These certificates states who found the body, who recovered it and sometimes by which family member the body was identified. It is therefore likely that there were more than 63 people on board. One explanation is that female partners were not included.
