= Gérard Brémond =

French businessman (1937–2026)

- Brémond in 2014
- Born: 22 September 1937; Boulogne-Billancourt, France
- Died: June 2026 (aged 88)
- Education: Institut d'Administration des Entreprises (Lic.)
- Occupation: Resort developer

Gérard Brémond (French: [ʒeʁaʁ bʁemɔ̃]; 22 September 1937 – June 2026) was a French resort developer.

== Life and career ==
Born in Boulogne-Billancourt on 22 September 1937, Brémond was the son of Jean-Robert Brémond and Gilberte Hetty de Castro. He attended secondary school at the Lycée Janson-de-Sailly before earning a licentiate in economics from the Institut d'Administration des Entreprises. In 1966, he met Jean Vuarnet, with whom he co-developed the ski resort Avoriaz. He designed the resort alongside architects Jacques Labro, Jean-Jacques Orzoni, and Jean-Marc Roques to create a unique building. In 1967, he founded Pierre & Vacances, which combined activities of tourism real estate and rentals. On 10 October 2017, he inaugurated Villages Nature Paris, an ecotourism complex which he had originally unveiled alongside Euro Disney S.A.S. in 2004. Also in 2004, he founded the Fondation Ensemble with his wife, Jacqueline Délia Brémond. In 2012, he purchased the jazz club Le Duc des Lombards, to remain close to his passion for jazz. In April 2010, he joined the supervisory board of Maroc Telecom.

Brémond died in June 2026, at the age of 88.
