= Landal Greenparks =

European network of holiday villages

Landal
- Industry: Tourism
- Founder: Nillmij en Arnhem
- Headquarters: Amsterdam, Netherlands
- Number of locations: 300
- Key people: Martin Jermiin (CEO), Boukje Taphoorn (CMPO), Carla Milovanov (CIO), Bastiaan Haks (CFO)
- Brands: Landal, Roompot
- Owner: Kohlberg Kravis Roberts & Co (KKR)
- Number of employees: 3,000
- Website: www.landal.com

Landal is a company established in the Netherlands that operates holiday parks across Europe. Until 2024 it operated under two names: Landal GreenParks and Roompot. The company manages and rents out more than 250 parks in the Netherlands, Belgium, Germany, Denmark, the United Kingdom, Austria, Switzerland and the Czech Republic, with around 23,000 holiday accommodations. Each year, 6 million guests book more than 27 million overnight stays.

Landal employs around 5,200 people across its parks and office locations. Offices are located in Amsterdam (headquarters), Goes, Zwolle, Trier and Varde.

Shares of the private limited company have been held by international investors since 1996; since the merger with Roompot in 2023, this has been American investment fund KKR & Co.

== History ==
=== Landal GreenParks ===
The company was founded in 1954, when Dutch insurance company "Nillmij en Arnhem" bought the Dutch holiday village "Rabbit Hill". Initially, it was meant to provide the houses to staff of the company, but because there was only a small number of these, people from outside the company were permitted to rent a bungalow, where they could celebrate their holiday. This business model became attractive, and more villages were built. The first village abroad appeared in 1965 in Germany.

The Nillmij company was rebranded, after several mergers since 1969, to "ENNIA". All holiday villages changed their name to ENNIA as well. In 1983, ENNIA merged with "AGO", and together, they formed the new company Aegon N.V. Every holiday village had to be renamed because of this merging. After several more companies merged, it was decided that the branch "Aegon Recreatie Holding B.V." had to be sold. On 18 July 1996, all holiday villages were sold at a loss to the Indofin group, a Rotterdam-based holding company. A partnership was formed with London-based Charterhouse Development Capital Ltd. and the operation was continued under the name "Landal GreenParks".

In 2002, Landal GreenParks acquired Beheer & Projecten B.V. (literally: Management & Projects) from Groningen, including the management contracts of 34 holiday villages of Gran Dorado, from French Groupe Pierre & Vacances, the parent company of Center Parcs. Originally Pierre & Vacances wanted to exploit the villages by themselves, but this was not approved by the Dutch Competition Authority. When the small villages from Creative Holiday Parks (acquired from Gran Dorado resorts in 1997) were taken over by Landal GreenParks, this company became the largest of holiday villages, while Gran Dorado and Center Parcs held this title first.

The company was part of Wyndham Destination Network, which is a business unit of Wyndham Worldwide. In 2018, Wyndham sold the company to Platinum Equity.

In July 2021, it was announced that Roompot, owned by KKR, would buy Landal GreenParks, subject to regulatory approval which was still pending in November 2021. Green light came in 2023, after 30 parks had been sold to Dormio Group, a solution designed by Landal.

In November 2021, following a strong summer of staycations, Landal announced that they would be adding nine more parks in the United Kingdom.

=== Roompot ===
Roompot was founded in 1965 in Kamperland. It grew from a family campsite into one of the largest providers of holiday accommodation in the Netherlands, Belgium and Germany. Roompot expanded by developing its own parks, especially along the coast, and by acquiring other operators such as Hogenboom and Qurios Holiday Retreats. The name Roompot refers to De Roompot, a shipping channel in the Oosterschelde, where the campsite and today’s Beach Resort Kamperland are located.

=== Merger with Roompot ===
In 2023 Landal GreenParks and Roompot merged and now operate under the name 'Landal'. The merger was announced in 2021. The Dutch Authority for Consumers and Markets (ACM) approved it in 2023. The parks are gradually adopting a new appearance and brand identity.

== Awards ==
Landal Darwin Forest won gold in VisitEngland's Awards for Excellence 2020 in the holiday park category. Landal Sandybrook is a finalist in VisitEngland's Awards for Excellence 2022.
