= Tossens =

- Ortsteil of Butjadingen
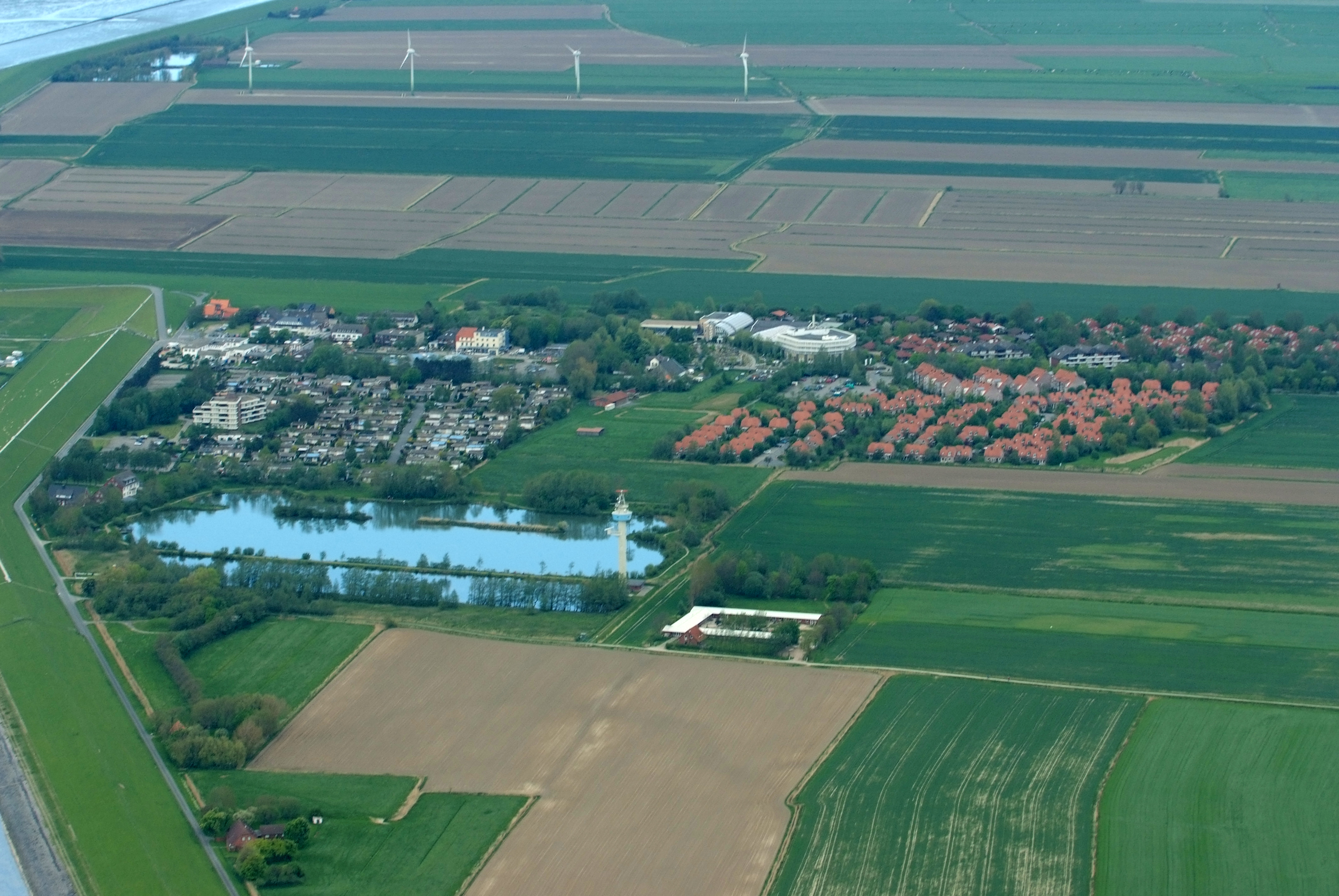
- Interactive map of Tossens
- Location within Germany Location within Lower Saxony
- Coordinates: 53°34′11″N 08°15′59″E
- Country: Germany
- State: Lower Saxony
- District: Wesermarsch
- Municipality: Butjadingen
- Time zone: UTC+01:00 (CET)
  - Summer (DST): UTC+02:00 (CEST)
- Postal codes: 26969
- Website: www.gemeinde-butjadingen.de

Tossens is a village on the Butjadingen peninsula in Germany, in the Bundesland of Niedersachsen.

It effectively consists of two areas: the tourist section on the coastline of Jadebusen bay; and the original village which is further inshore.

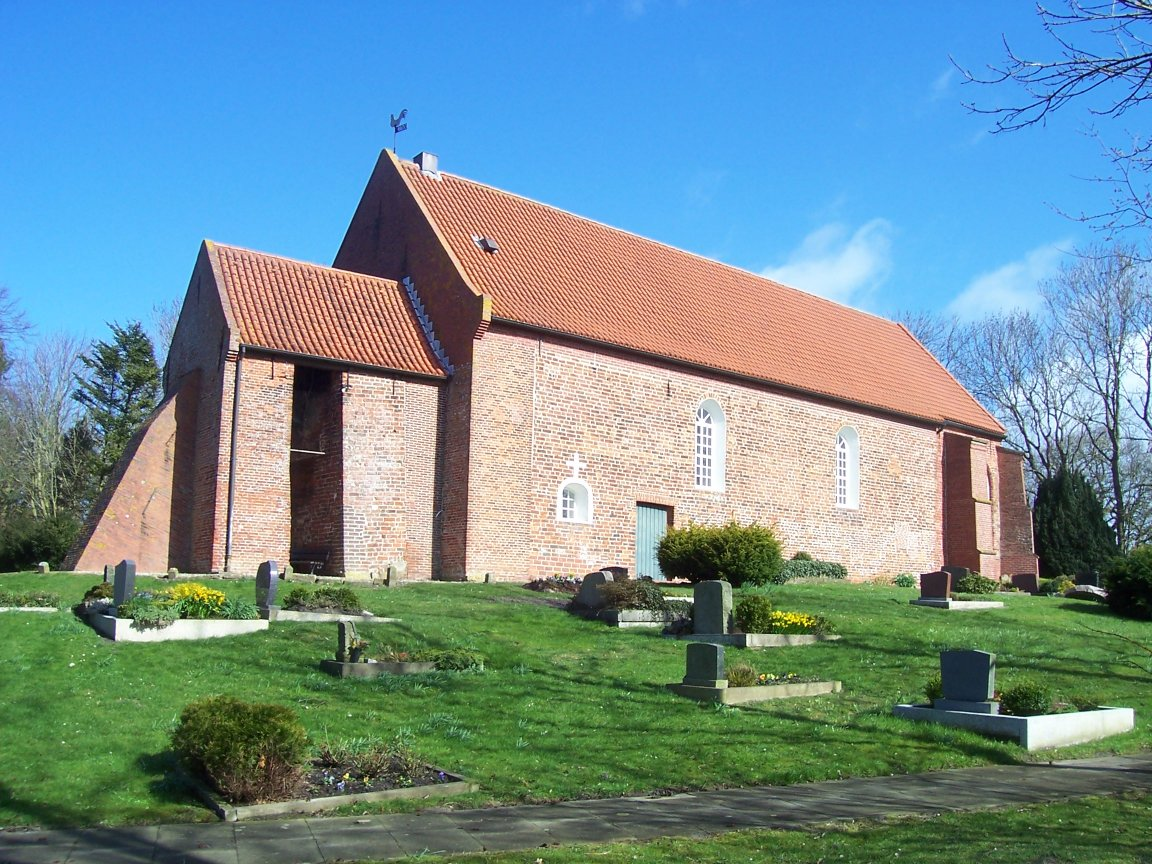
St. Bartholomäus Church

In the village is the Warft church of St. Bartholomäus.

Tossens is also the location of Center Parcs Butjadinger Küste resort.
