= Pierre & Vacances =

Company specializing in tourism services

Pierre & Vacances SA
- Type: Public
- Traded as: Euronext: VAC; CAC Small
- Industry: Tourism; Hospitality; Real estate development
- Founded: 1967; 59 years ago
- Founder: Gérard Brémond
- Headquarters: Paris, France
- Area served: Europe, Mauritius and France's overseas territories and islands
- Key people: Sven Boinet (Chairman and CEO)
- Revenue: €1.47 billion (2011) (Note: Between 31 March 2011 and 31 March 2012.)
- Operating income: €19.80 million (2011) (Note: Between 31 March 2011 and 31 March 2012.)
- Net income: €10.50 million (2011) (Note: Between 31 March 2011 and 31 March 2012.)
- Total assets: €1.67 billion (2011) (Note: As of 31 March 2012.)
- Total equity: €493.74 million (2011) (Note: As of 31 March 2012.)
- Number of employees: 7,455 (2011)
- Website: www.pierreetvacances.co.uk

Groupe Pierre & Vacances Center Parcs (French pronunciation: [ɡʁup pjɛʁ e vakɑ̃s sɑ̃tœʁ paʁk]) specializes in tourism services, providing holiday and entertainment villages, leisure activity residences and hotels under the brands Pierre & Vacances, Maeva, Center Parcs, Sunparks, and Adagio (the last in partnership with Accor). The headquarters of the company is in France and the core area of the company's activities is France, but it also has facilities in Belgium, Mauritius, the Netherlands, Switzerland, Austria, Germany, Italy, and Spain.

== History ==
=== First years ===
In 1967, Gérard Brémond (the future developer and main owner of Pierre et Vacances) and Jean Vuarnet (a French Olympic ski champion) entered partnership to open a skiing "village" and resort, called Avoriaz, which adopted innovative concepts. Vehicles were forbidden inside the village and children had their own sectors. The style of the buildings was designed to harmonize with the surrounding landscape.

Interest in the resort increased in 1973, when Brémond (a film buff) inaugurated a science fiction festival. The company adopted the name Pierre & Vacances in 1975, developing more resorts in the mountains and then on the coast. This new development area brought it accusations of being a company that "filled up the French coast with cement."

By the end of the 70s, the company started to leave the real estate development and refocused itself on tourist services. It introduced a concept called "Nouvelle Propriété" (New Property), which let the tourists actually own properties inside the Pierre & Vacances' vacation villages at a relatively low cost. The new owners also received a small, but guaranteed, percentage from rental fees and could exchange their properties with anyone within the Pierre & Vacances network. The new concept enabled the company to grow without taking on debt.

=== Acquisitions ===
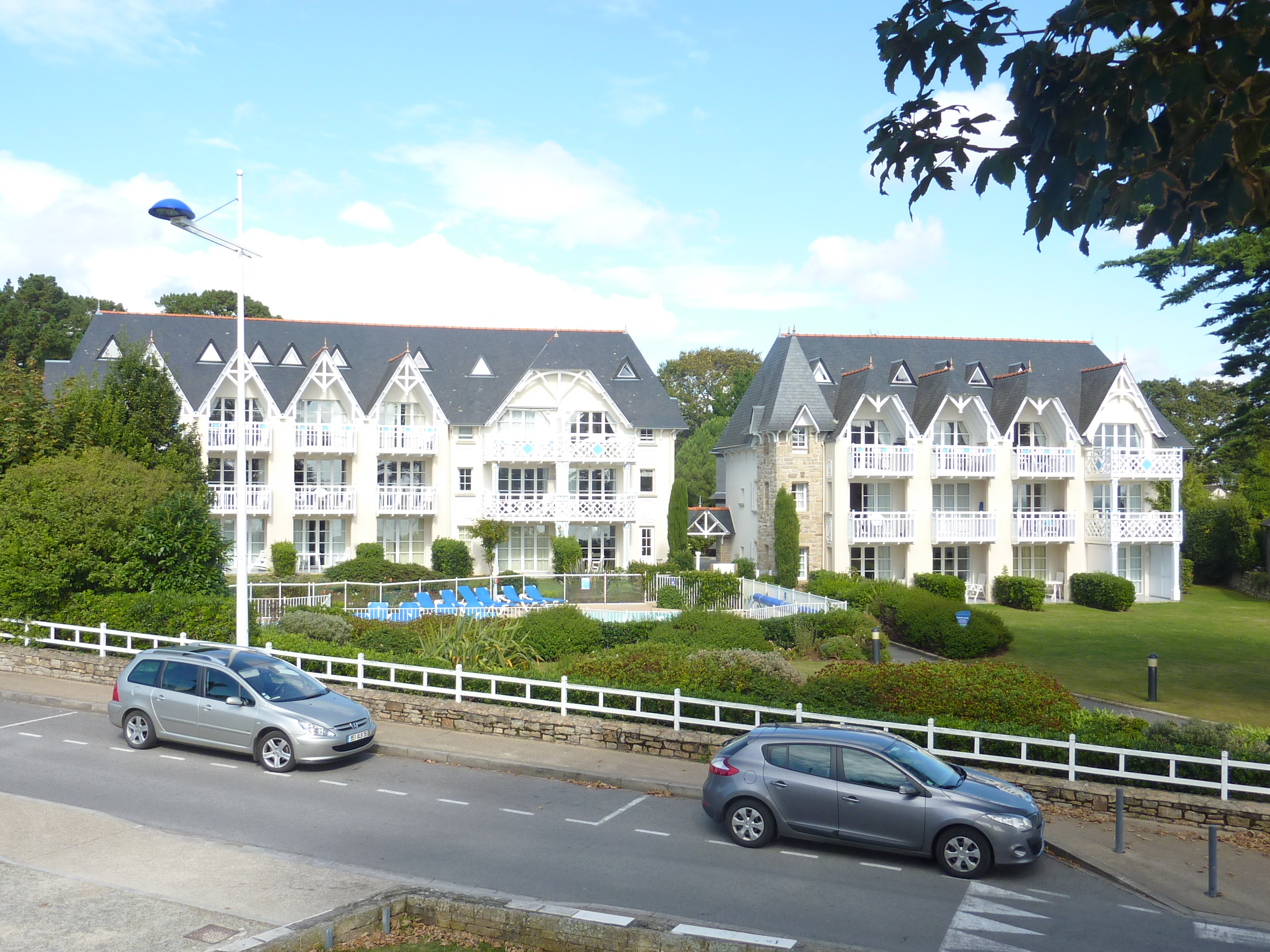
Pierre & Vacances residences in Bénodet.

In 1988, Pierre & Vacances started to acquire rival companies. The first purchases included Geer (developments Cap Esterel, Les Coches and Port-Bourgenay on the Mediterranean Sea) and Sogerva and Port du Crouesty (facilities on the Atlantic coast).

Pierre & Vacances emerged relatively unscathed from economic crisis in the 1990s, and accelerated its expansion by purchasing struggling rivals such as Société des Montagnes de l'Arc (1993), Rocher Soleil (1996) Sofap Loisirs and Pont-Royal (1997). Pont-Royal was a key piece in the company's growth, because the French State had granted it permission to construct over 20,000 square metres in the Provence region.

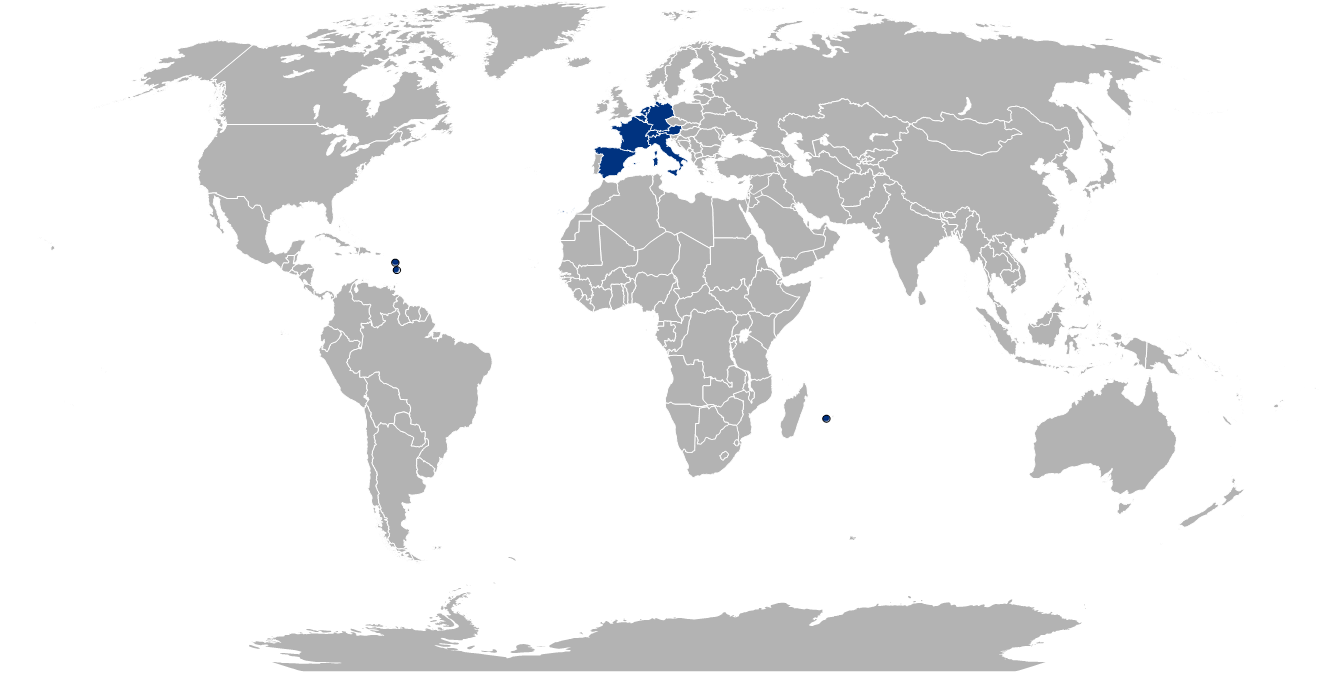
Location of the Groupe Pierre & Vacances Center Parcs' facilities in 2012.

The company quickly adapted to the new market demands. In 1998, it launched the "eco-village" in the Picardy region and opened its first facilities outside France, in Martinique and Guadeloupe. Pierre & Vacances became a holding company, gathering all its subsidiaries under its name.

In 1999, Pierre & Vacances was listed on the Paris stock exchange. In March of that year, it purchased the resort chain Orion from Whitehall et Westmont Hospitality. Then, it entered into a joint venture with Beni Stabili with the aim of purchasing properties in Italy. In April 2000, Pierre & Vacances acquired Grand Dorado (later renamed Center Parcs), one of the leading companies in the Benelux's tourism accommodation market. In March 2001, in a joint venture with Deutsche Bank, it acquired Center Parcs Europe, a large resort parks company. In July 2001, it acquired the ski resort operations of Groupe Washington at the Valmoral resort and, in September of that year, Club Méditerranée's Maeva SA. This operation made Pierre & Vacances the leader in the French market. In 2002, the Italian company Valtur was added to Pierre & Vacances' portfolio. In 2003, the Pierre & Vacances' holding became the sole owner of Central Parcs.

In 2007, Pierre & Vacances and Accor formed a joint venture to create a new company, called Adagio, with the aim of developing city residences in Europe. That year it also acquired a real estate development company focused on Mediterranean style villages for elderly people (Les Senioriales SA) and the Sunparks Group.

In 2009, the name was changed from "Groupe Pierre & Vacances" to "Groupe Pierre & Vacances Center Parcs".

In October 2023, the group, through its brand Maeva, acquired Vacansoleil.

== Current operations ==
The company operates approximately 51,000 hotels, apartments, houses and similar accommodation (236,000 beds). It is still present in the property development sector through the subsidiaries PV-CP Support Services BV, Pierre & Vacances Investissement XXXXVIII, Pierre & Vacances Investissement XXXXIX and Les Senioriales SA.

=== Major chains ===

| Brand | Type | Market | Number of locations |
|---|---|---|---|
| Pierre & Vacances | Residences | Upscale | 86 |
| Pierre & Vacances Premium | Residences | Premium | 20 |
| Maeva | Residences | Midscale | 81 |
| Center Parcs | Domains | Upscale | 28 |
| Sunparks | Domains | Midscale | 2 |
| Pierre & Vacances Villages clubs | Village clubs | Upscale | 15 |
| Adagio | City apartments | Upscale | 34 |
| Adagio Access | City apartments | Midscale | 50 |

== Ownership ==
Groupe Pierre & Vacances Central Parcs is mainly controlled by Gerard Brémond using a complex system of holding companies as shareholders.

== See also ==
- Adagio City Apartment Hotels
