= Holiday village =

Settlement mostly consisting of holiday homes

A holiday village (abbreviated HV) is a holiday resort where the visitors stay in villas. There is a central area with shops, entertainment, and other amenities. One example is Center Parcs.

== See also ==
- Cottage country
- Resort town
