= Center Parcs Europe =

European network of holiday villages that was founded in the Netherlands in 1968

Center Parcs Europe N.V.
- Type: Public limited company (Naamloze vennootschap)
- Industry: Leisure
- Founded: 1968
- Founder: Piet Derksen
- Headquarters: Rivium Boulevard 213, Capelle aan den IJssel, Netherlands
- Number of locations: Center Parcs - 28; Sunparks - 2
- Brands: Center Parcs, Sunparks
- Parent: Pierre & Vacances
- Website: centerparcs.eu

Center Parcs Europe N.V. (formerly Center Parcs) is a European network of holiday villages that was founded in the Netherlands in 1968, and is currently operated by Pierre & Vacances.

== History ==
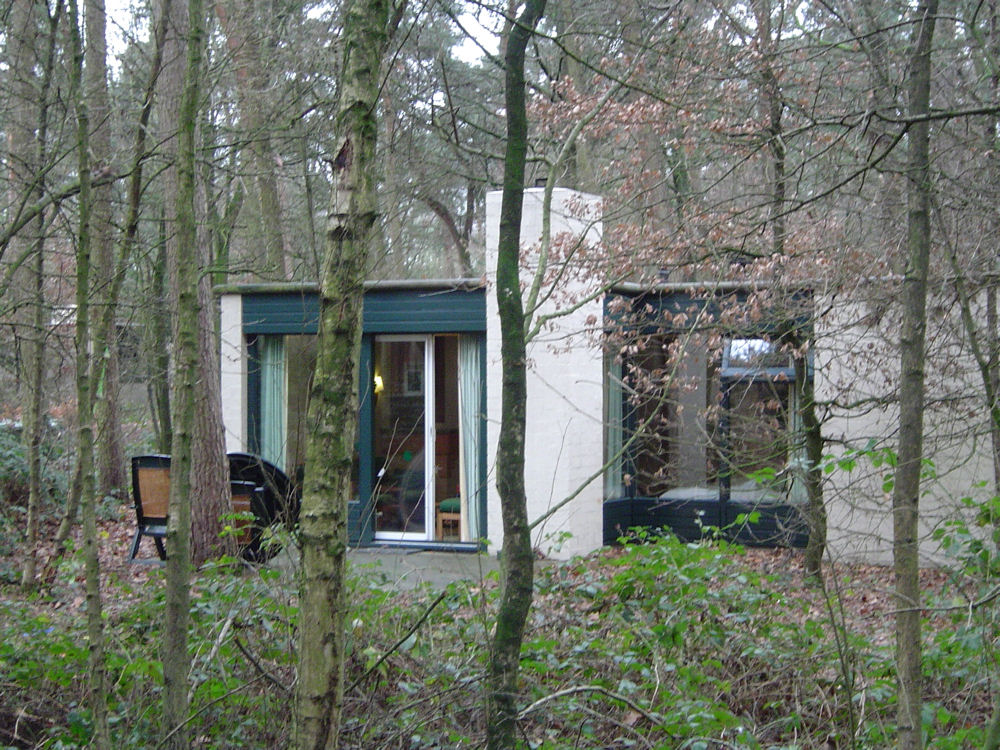
An original Center Parcs Cottage (named 'Villas' in UK resorts), designed by the Dutch architect Jaap Bakema.

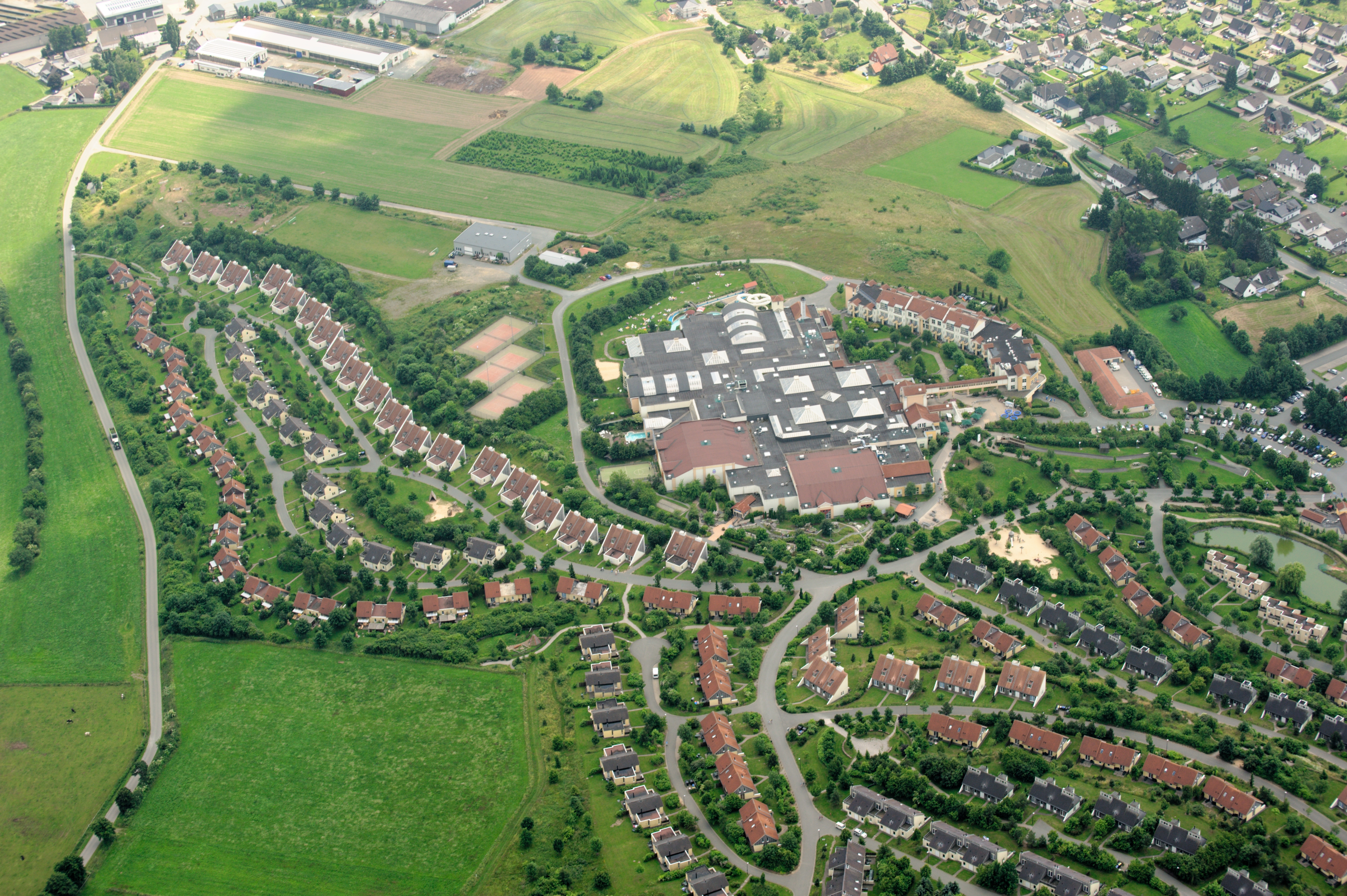
Center Parcs Hochsauerland in Germany

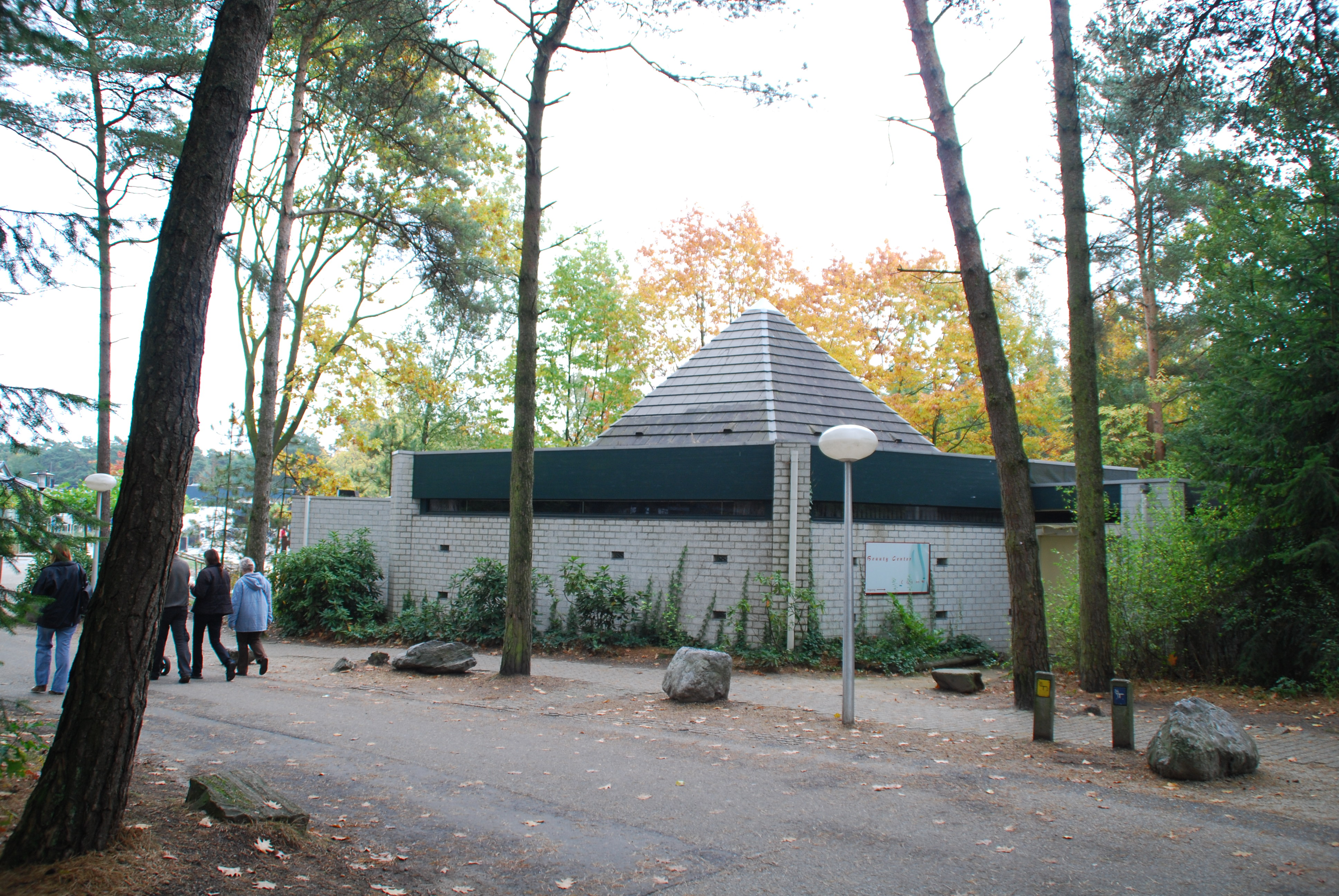
The former church at CP Het Vennenbos. Because Derksen was a Catholic, he decided to build small churches at his parks. There was a similar church at Sherwood Forest which has since been converted into a Starbucks.

Dutch entrepreneur Piet Derksen started a sporting goods shop in 1953 at Lijnbaan, Rotterdam. Its name was 'Sporthuis Centrum', 'Sport House Centre'. It succeeded and Derksen expanded into 17 outlets across the Netherlands, and then added camping articles to the range.

In 1968, Derksen purchased woodland near Reuver so staff and customers could relax in small tents. The park, De Lommerbergen, was successful, and the tents were soon replaced with bungalows. In 1987, Center Parcs opened its first UK resort at Sherwood Forest in Nottinghamshire. This brought the company into the sights of expanding brewer Scottish and Newcastle, which later bought the group.

In 2001, the UK locations separated from the continental Europe locations and formed a separate company, Center Parcs UK.

In 2003, Scottish & Newcastle sold the continental European sites to a joint venture of Pierre & Vacances (P&V) and Deutsche Bank Capital Partners (DBCP), a German investment group. This was given the name Center Parcs Europe (CPE). P&V owned Europe's largest (in terms of bed-count) bungalow-vacation-supplier, Gran Dorado Resorts, a Dutch former joint venture of Vendex, Algemeen Burgerlijk Pensioenfonds, GAK and Philips Rentefonds. P&V brought Gran Dorado in the joint venture.

As CPE was based in Rotterdam, Netherlands, the Dutch and European Commercial Competition Authority did not approve of combining Gran Dorado and Center Parcs, as it would effectively control the European market. After agreeing to a reduction in beds owned, CPE sold all but six Gran Dorado Resorts to Dutch Landal GreenParks. The remaining six parks were added to CenterParcs: Loohorst (NL), Port Zelande (NL), Zandvoort (NL), Weerterbergen (NL), Hochsauerland (D) and Heilbachsee (D).

After the sale, five of the six remaining Gran Dorado Resorts parks were rebranded Sea Spirit from Center Parcs or Free Life from Center Parcs. The Weerterbergen-Resort was sold to Roompot because of the cost of bringing it to standard. All original Center Parcs resorts in the Netherlands, France, Belgium and Germany were sub-branded CP Original. Having completed the integration and rebranding exercise, Pierre & Vacances bought DBCP out of the partnership.

In January 2009, Sunparks launched alongside Center Parcs in Europe, as a low-cost brand. Many of the former Gran Dorado resorts were rebranded in this exercise, but the sub brand was dropped in 2011 and the parks were rebranded to Center Parcs. In 2025, Center Parcs opened their first resort in Denmark.

== Operations and facilities ==
There are now 28 resorts in the Netherlands, France, Belgium, Germany and Denmark. Most villages are different, but some villages such as Bispinger Heide in Germany and Domaine Les Bois Francs in France (and many more) share the same Village Plaza design. They have the same styled Aqua Mundo and Sports Plaza. Accommodation is in villas or bungalows, clustered in a park and surrounded by trees and bushes. An exception is Park Zandvoort, set among sand dunes. Certain resorts also provide hotel rooms. The first village had features that have stayed popular like the swimming pool, shops and restaurants. The first dome arrived in 1980, named Subtropical Swimming Paradise in UK resorts and Aqua Mundo in European resorts. A range of sporting activities is available, with restaurants, spas, saunas, and massage.

In 2009, Center Parcs Europe divided its parks into two brands: "Center Parcs", which includes the 5-star parks, and "Sunparks", which includes the 3- or 4-star parks. At the beginning of 2011 the company decided to rename most Sunparks as Center Parcs.

== All resorts ==
Center Parcs Europe owns and/or operates 28 Center Parcs resorts and 2 Sunparks resorts. Aroundtown owns the freehold of seven of these resorts.

Overview of all Center Parcs resorts
Country	Resort	City	Region	First Opened	Became Center Parcs	Notes
Netherlands	De Huttenheugte	Dalen	Drenthe	1972		
Netherlands	Parc Sandur*	Emmen	Drenthe	1999	2011	
Netherlands	De Eemhof	Zeewolde	Flevoland	1980		
Netherlands	De Kempervennen	Westerhoven	North Brabant	1983		
Netherlands	Het Meerdal	America	Limburg	1971		
Netherlands	Het Heijderbos	Heijen	Limburg	1986		
Netherlands	Limburgse Peel*	America	Limburg	1980	2002	
Netherlands	Port Zélande	Ouddorp	South Holland	1990	2002	
Netherlands	Park Zandvoort*	Zandvoort	North Holland	1989	2002	
Germany	Park Eifel*	Gunderath	Rhineland-Palatinate	1979	2002	
Germany	Park Nordseeküste*	Tossens	Lower Saxony	1992	2002	
Germany	Park Hochsauerland	Medebach	North Rhine-Westphalia	1994	2002	
Germany	Bispinger Heide	Bispingen	Lower Saxony	1995		
Germany	Park Bostalsee	Nohfelden	Saarland	2013		
Germany	Park Allgäu	Leutkirch	Baden Württemberg	2018		
Denmark	Nordborg Resort	Nordborg	Southern Denmark	2025		
France	Les Bois-Francs	Verneuil-sur-Avre	Upper Normandy	1988		
France	Les Hauts de Bruyères	Chaumont-sur-Tharonne	Centre-Val de Loire	1993		
France	Le Lac d'Ailette	Chamouille	Picardy	2007		
France	Les Trois Forêts	Hattigny	Lorraine	2010		
France	Le Bois aux daims	Les Trois-Moutiers, Morton	Nouvelle-Aquitaine	2015		
France	Villages Nature Paris (Disneyland Paris)	Marne-La-Vallée	Île-De-France	2017		Originally a joint-venture with Euro Disney S.C.A.
France	Les Landes de Gascogne	Beauziac		2022		
Belgium	Erperheide	Peer	Limburg	1981		
Belgium	De Vossemeren	Lommel	Limburg	1987		
Belgium	Terhills Resort	Dilsen-Stokkem	Limburg	2021		
Belgium	Park De Haan*	De Haan	West Flanders	1989	2007	
Belgium	Les Ardennes*	Vielsalm	Luxembourg	1992	2007	
Belgium	Sunparks					
Belgium	Kempense Meren	Mol	Antwerp	1994	2007	
Belgium	Oostduinkerke	Oostduinkerke	West Flanders	1981	2007	
Resorts in development
Germany	Pütnitz	Ribnitz-Damgarten	Mecklenburg-Vorpommern	T.B.D.		
Former resorts
Netherlands	De Lommerbergen	Reuver	Limburg	1968 - 1996		Sold to Creatief Vakantieparken
Netherlands	Het Vennenbos	Hapert	Noord-Brabant	1970 - 1994		Sold to Creatief Vakantieparken
Netherlands	De Berkenhorst	Kootwijk	Gelderland	1975 - 1990		Sold to Creatief Vakantieparken
United Kingdom	Sherwood Forest	Rufford	Nottinghamshire	1987 - 2001		Spun off into Center Parcs UK and Ireland
United Kingdom	Elveden Forest	Brandon	Suffolk	1989 - 2001		Spun off into Center Parcs UK and Ireland
United Kingdom	Longleat Forest	Warminster	Wiltshire	1994 - 2001		Spun off into Center Parcs UK and Ireland
*Former Sunparks

== See also ==
- Tropical Islands Resort - another large European indoor sub-tropical leisure village
