= De Koog =

- Village
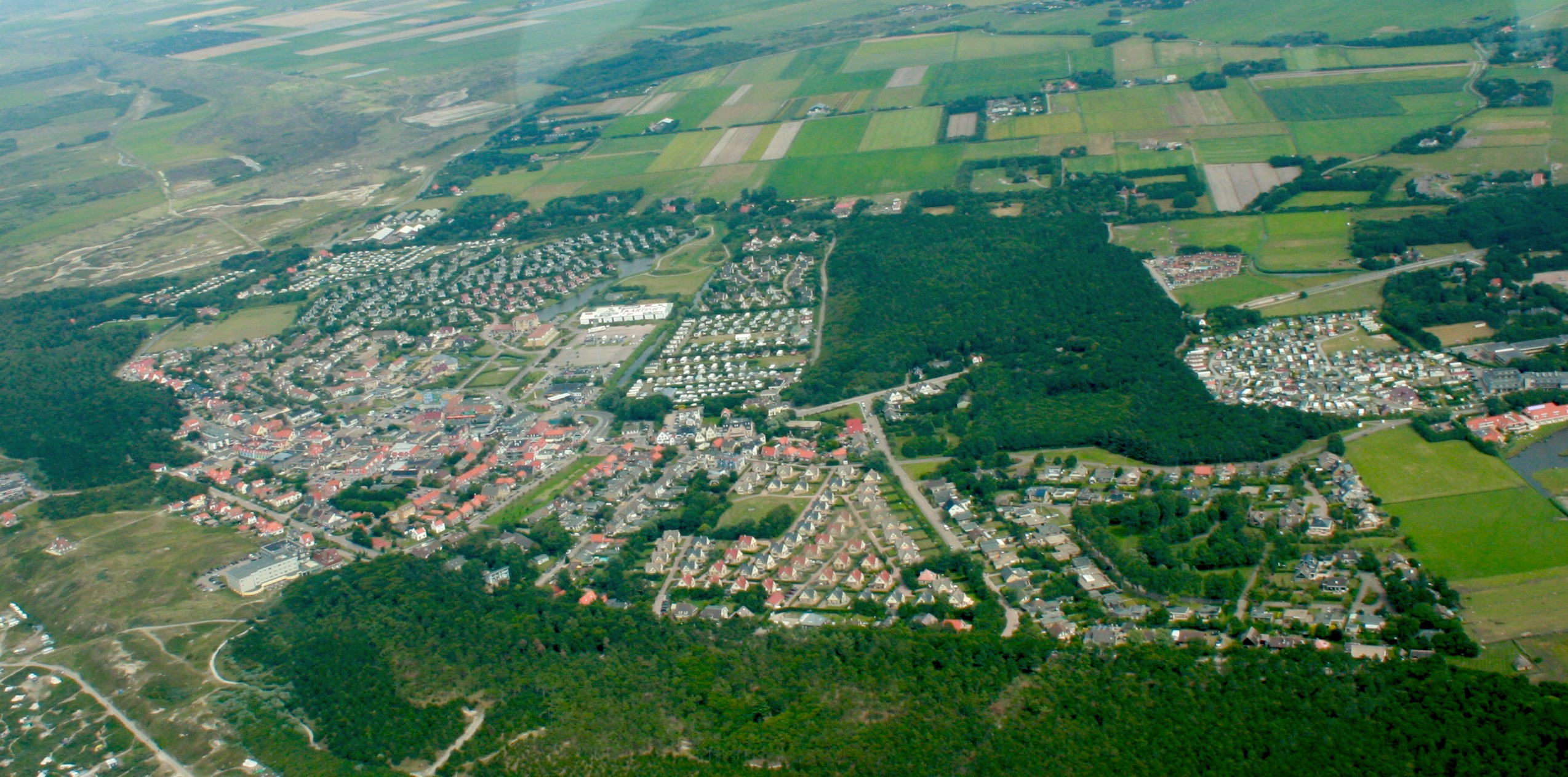
- Aerial view of De Koog, in north-east direction

- Location in the Netherlands Location in the province of North Holland in the Netherlands
- Coordinates: 53°5′52″N 4°45′46″E
- Country: Netherlands
- Province: North Holland
- Municipality: Texel

Area
  - Total: 2.83 km^{2} (1.09 sq mi)
- Elevation: 10 m (33 ft)

Population (2025)
  - Total: 1,030
  - Density: 364/km^{2} (943/sq mi)
- Time zone: UTC+1 (CET)
  - Summer (DST): UTC+2 (CEST)
- Postal code: 1796
- Dialing code: 0222

De Koog is a village in the Dutch province of North Holland. It is a part of the municipality of Texel, and lies about 17 km north of Den Helder. It is the chief centre of tourism on the island, surrounded with many hotels and campgrounds. The village is located on the North Sea coast of the island. Only two narrow lines of dunes separate the village from the beach.

South of the village is a wooded area which is also popular with tourists. The information centre and museum about the Wadden Sea, Ecomare, are located here.

== History ==
The village was first mentioned in 1436 as Cogersdyck, and means "land on water". De Koog is a road village which developed in the dunes during the 14th century. It used to be a fishing village up to the middle of the 16th century until the Anegat silted. In 1570, the village was flooded, and in 1840 was home to 81 people.

In 1896, a pavilion was established. A hotel followed in 1908, and De Koog developed into a tourist resort. After World War II, it developed into the main beach village due to its proximity to the sea.

== Gallery ==
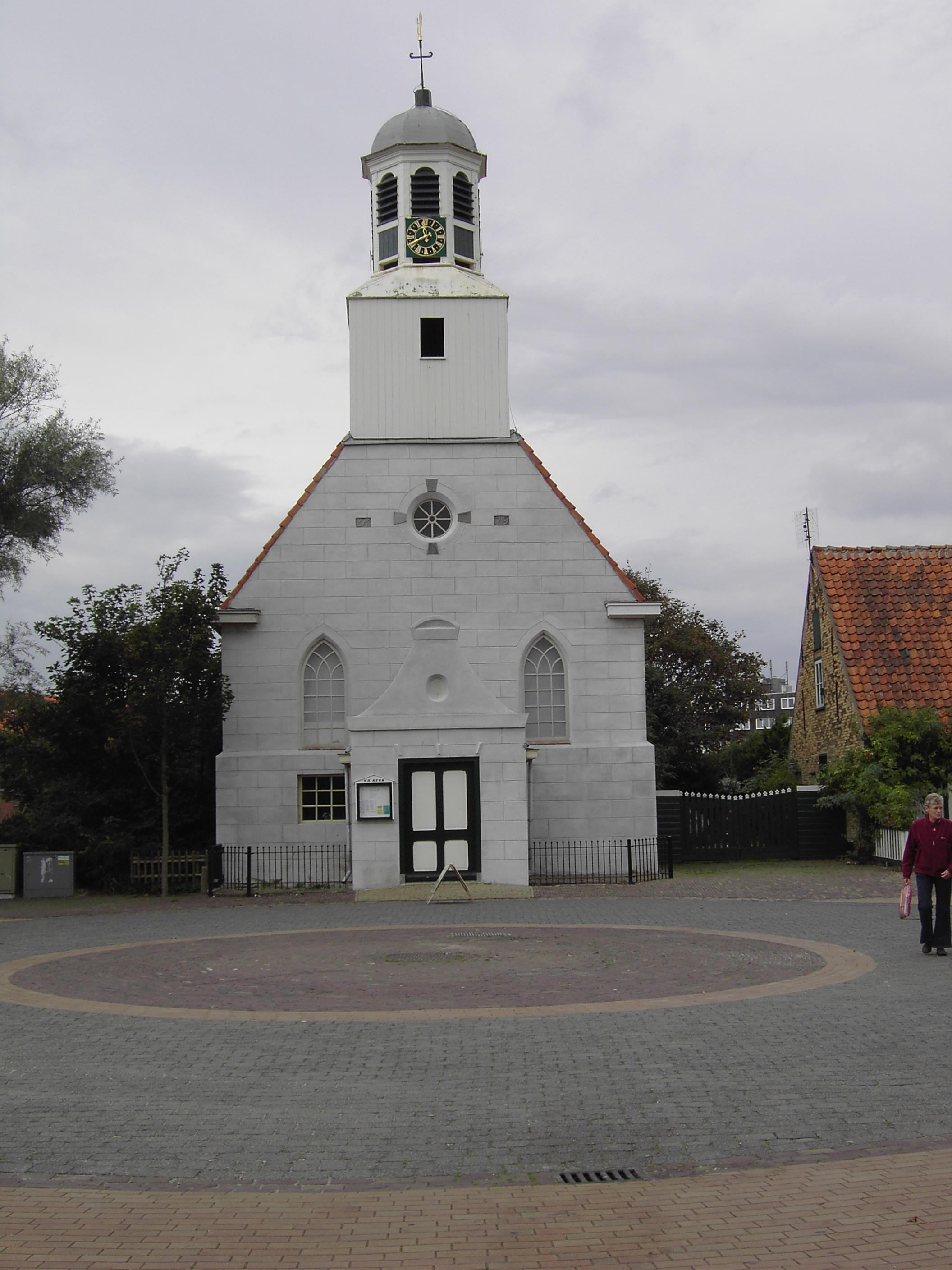
Church in De Koog

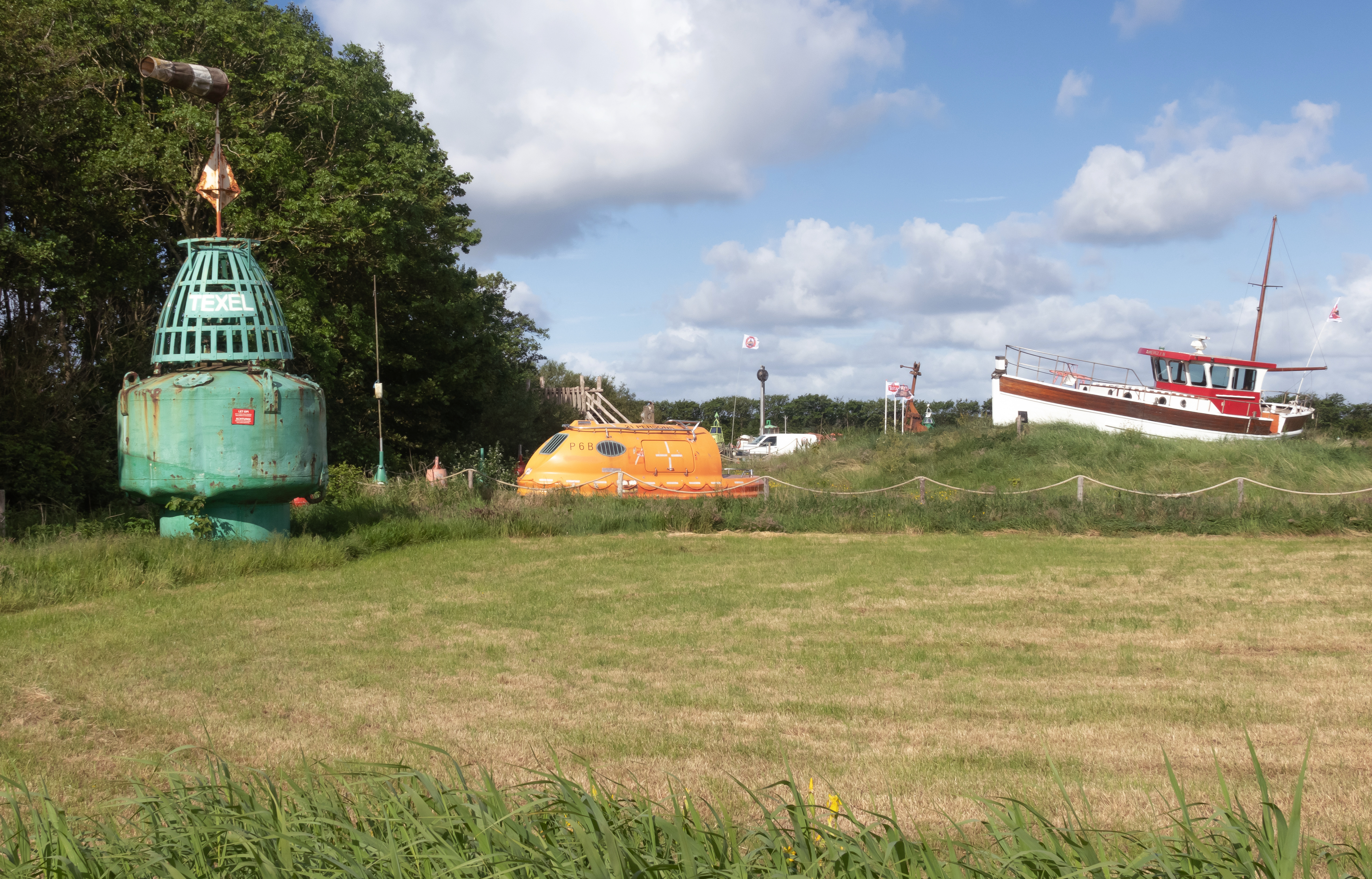
Museum in De Koog

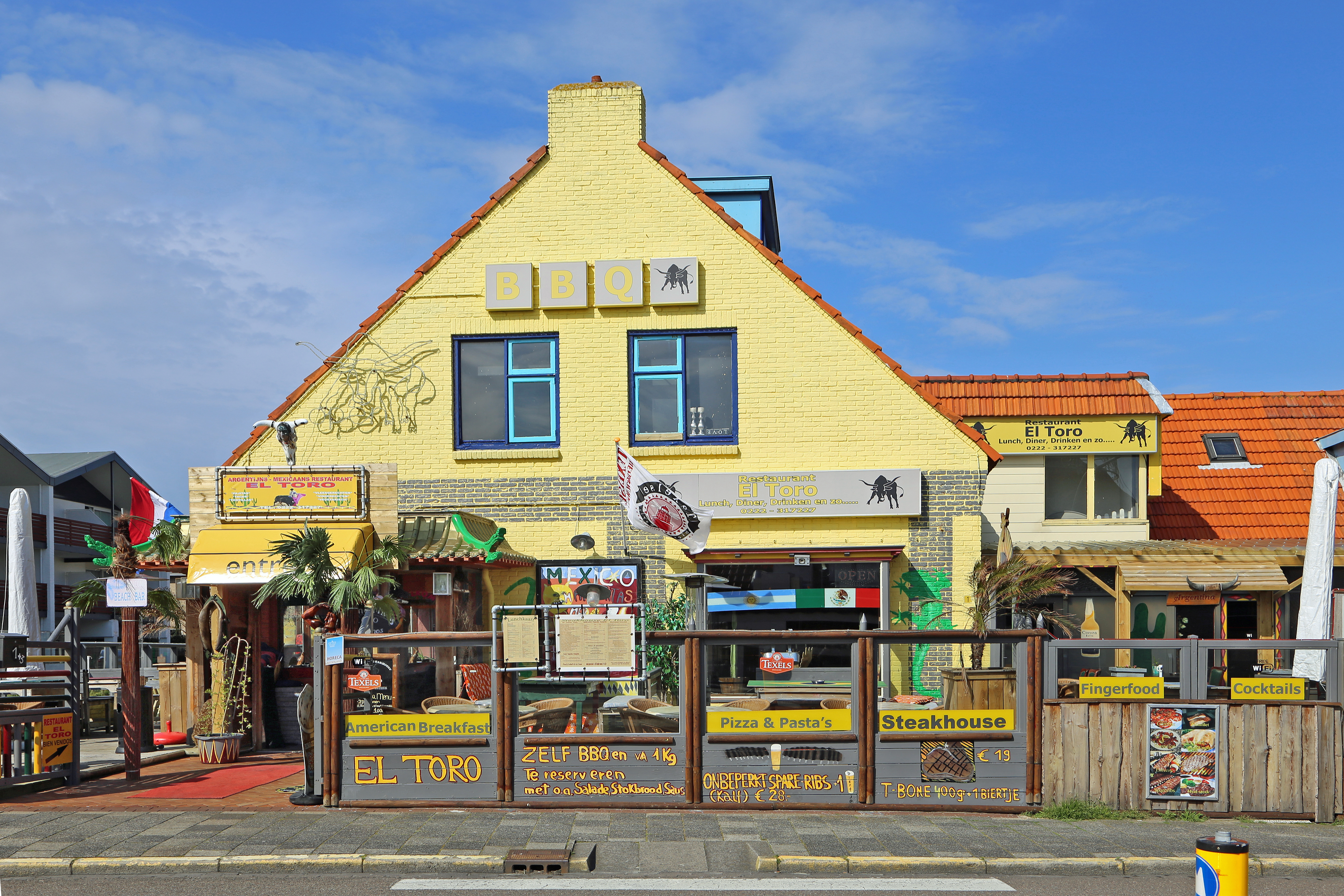
Restaurant

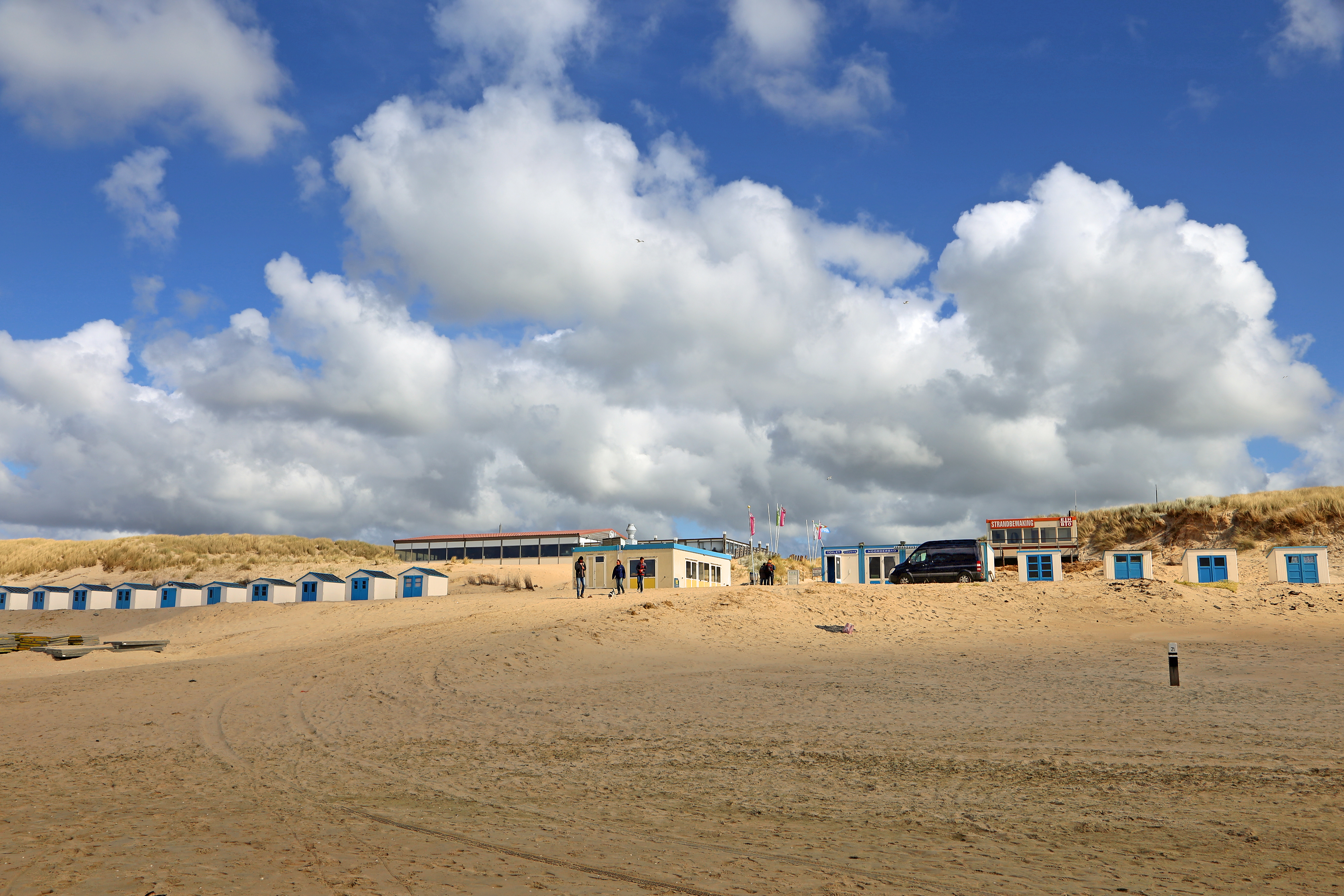
The beach
