= Christophoros Nungovitch =

Personal information
- Full name: Christophoros Nungovitch
- Born: December 14, 1989 (age 36) Kinshasa, DR Congo
- Height: 1.86 m (6 ft 1 in)

Sport
- Sport: Handball
- Position: Goalkeeper
- Current club: (Cyprus) Omonoia 29M
- Number: 89

Youth career
- Years: Team
- 1999–2007: (Cyprus) SPE Strovolou Nicosia

Senior clubs
- Years: Team
- 2007–2011: (Cyprus) SPE Strovolou Nicosia
- 2011–2015: (Greece) A.O. Diomidis Argous
- 2015–2017: (France) Montélimar Cruas
- 2017–2018: (Slovakia) HKM Šaľa
- 2018–2019: (Switzerland) TV Endingen
- 2019–2020: (Russia) Spartak Moscow
- 2020–2021: (Germany) Falken HSG Groß-Bieberau/Modau
- 2021–2023: (Cyprus) Anorthosis Famagusta HB
- 2023–2024: (Italy) SSV Bozen Loacker
- 2024–2025: (Cyprus) Anorthosis Famagusta HB
- 2025–: (Cyprus) Omonoia 29M
National team
Years	Team	Apps
2008–2021	Cyprus	40
2023–	DR Congo	
Medal record
Men's Handball
EHF Challenge Cup
Gold medal – first place	EHF Challenge 2012	A.O. Diomidis Argous
- Updated on June 2021 (UTC)

Christophoros Nungovitch (born 14 December 1989 in Kinshasa, DR Congo) is a Cypriot professional handball player who plays as a goalkeeper for Cypriot A1 Andrón side Omonoia 29M and for the DR Congo men's national handball team. He formerly captained the Cyprus men's national handball team. Nungovitch played for professional teams in Cyprus, Greece, France, Slovakia, Switzerland, Russia, Germany and Italy.

== Honours ==
=== Club ===
==== EHF Challenge Cup ====
- Winner: 2011–2012

==== Swiss NLB ====
- Champion: 2018–2019

==== Greek 1st League ====
- Champion: 2011–2012, 2013–2014
- Runner-up: 2012–13, 2014–2015

==== Greek Cup ====
- Runner-up: 2013–14

==== Cypriot 1st League ====
- Champion: 2008–2009, 2009–2010, 2010–2011

==== Cypriot Cup ====
- Winner: 2008–2009, 2010–2011

=== National team ===
Weihai International Beach Handball Tournament, China

- (gold) Champion 2017

=== Individual ===
- (Russia) Russian Super Cup Final (against Chekhovskiye Medvedi) MVP: 2019
- (Switzerland) International Tournament GoEasy-Cup Best Goalkeeper award: 2018
- (Cyprus) EBT Petrolina Beach Handball Tournament Best Goalkeeper award: 2017
- (Slovakia) 4° International Handball Tournament Arminius Cup Best Goalkeeper award: 2017
- (Europe) 2° IHF Men's Emerging Nations Championship All-Star: 2017
- (Greece) Hellenic Handball Federation Best Goalkeeper: 2012, 2015
- Cyprus Handball Federation Best Young Goalkeeper: 2008
