= Anorthosis Famagusta H.C. =

Cypriot handball club

Sabbianco Anorthosis Famagusta
- Full name: Sabbianco Anorthosis Famagusta HC
- Nickname: Η Μεγάλη Κυρία (The Old Lady)
- Short name: Anorthosis
- Founded: January 30, 1911; 115 years ago
- Arena: Kition Arena
- Head coach: Marios Efstathiadis
- League: Cypriot First Division
- Club colours
| Home | Away |

Anorthosis Famagusta (Greek: Ανόρθωση Αμμοχώστου, romanized: Anorthosi Ammochostou), commonly known as Anorthosis in English or Anorthosi in Greek, is a Cypriot handball club from Famagusta, which is temporarily based in Nicosia, due to its hometown being occupied by the Turkish army since 1974, that plays in the Cypriot First Division.

The current name of the club is Sabbianco Anorthosis Famagusta due to sponsorship reasons.

Location of Anorthosis Famagusta

== History ==
The club was founded on January 30, 1911, in the city of Famagusta. In the early years the club was not focused on sports but mainly national, spiritual, cultural and social activities. In 1928 it began to develop sporting activities. After the Turkish invasion in July 1974, the club moved to Larnaca (soccer section), Limassol (volleyball section) and Nicosia (handball section).

== Crest, colours, supporters ==
=== Kit manufacturers ===
| Period | Kit manufacturer |
|---|---|
| 2021 | (Italy) Legea |
| 2021 - 2023 | (Germany) Adidas |
| 2023–present | (Greece) Vaat |

=== Kits ===
HOME

2021–22

AWAY
2022-23

== Team ==
=== Current squad ===
Squad for the 2024–25 season

Anorthosis Famagusta

Goalkeepers

- 12 (Cyprus) Christophoros Nungovitch
- 77 (Cyprus) Ioannis Fessias
- 4 (Greece) Konstantinos Gourgoumis

Left Wingers

- 2 (Greece) Panteleimon Kostakidis
- 6 (Cyprus) Angelos Leonidou

Right Wingers

- 25 (Greece) Dimitris Kaimakamis
- 8 (Greece) Konstantinos Bakatselos
- 24 (Croatia) Marko Buntic

Line Players

- 19 (Greece) Chrysanthos Tsanaxides
- 40 (Cyprus) Kleanthis Charalambous

Left Backs

- 73 (Greece) Tzouro Mougits
- 13 (Croatia) Josip Bezer
- 15 (Cyprus) Marios Selvi

Central Backs

- 88 (Greece) Eleftherios Seirekidis
- 10 (Cyprus) Julios Argyrou

Right Backs

- 23 (Serbia) Lazar Adamovic

=== Technical staff ===
- Head coach: (Cyprus) Marios Efstathiadis

=== Transfers ===
Transfers for the 2026–27 season

Joining

- (Brazil) Lucas Adriano Barros Araxá (LP) from (Slovakia) HT Tatran Prešov

Leaving

=== Transfer History ===
Transfers for the 2022–23 season

Joining

- (Russia) Yegor Yevdokimov (LP) from (Cyprus) Parnassos Strovolou
- (Slovenia) Domen Sikošek Pelko (LP) from (Switzerland) HC Kriens-Luzern
- (Slovenia) Jaka Špiljak (LB) from (Spain) Balonmano Torrelavega
- (Serbia) Dejan Karan (CB) from (Finland) HIFK Handboll
- (Croatia) Eugen Josip Zaja (RB) from (Croatia) MRK Sesvete
- (Greece) Konstantinos Tsamesidis (RW) from (Greece) A.E.S.H. Pylea
- (Dominican Republic) Rene Roberto Valdez (LB) from (Portugal) Associação Artística de Avanca
- (Cyprus) Nearchos Michaelides (RW) from (Cyprus) Parnassos Strovolou
- (Cyprus) Fotis Fekkas (LB) from (Cyprus) APOEL HC

Leaving

- (Cyprus) Loukas Paraskeva (LB) to (Cyprus) Parnassos Strovolou
- Andreas Constantinou (LP) to European University Cyprus
- (Croatia) Eugen Josip Zaja (RB) to (Spain) Balonmano Sinfín

== Previous squads ==
2020–2021 Team
| Shirt No | Nationality | Player | Birth Date | Position |
|---|---|---|---|---|
| 1 | Greece | Konstantinos Kotanidis | 7 February 1992 (age 34) | Goalkeeper |
| 2 | Cyprus | Marios Efstathiadis | 26 November 1979 (age 46) | Left Back |
| 3 | Greece | Panagiotis Karampourniotis | 20 February 1998 (age 28) | Line Player |
| 4 | Greece | Marios-Alexandros Moraitis | 26 January 1996 (age 30) | Left Back |
| 7 | Cyprus | Orestis Leontiou | 4 May 1985 (age 41) | Line Player |
| 8 | Greece | Nikolaos Kritikos | 24 September 1996 (age 30) | Left Back |
| 10 | Cyprus | Julios Argyrou | 14 November 1984 (age 41) | Central Back |
| 11 | Greece | Stylianos Asvestas | 21 March 1999 (age 27) | Right Back |
| 13 | Cyprus | Kyriakos Vorkas | 20 May 1985 (age 41) | Line Player |
| 15 | Cyprus | Andreas Fotiou | 22 September 1993 (age 33) | Left Winger |
| 16 | Greece | Georgios Barmpas | 25 December 1982 (age 43) | Goalkeeper |
| 17 | Greece | Petros Kandylas | 28 February 1991 (age 35) | Central Back |
| 18 | Cyprus | Constantinos Michael | 15 August 1989 (age 37) | Right Winger |
| 19 | Cyprus | Christos Argyrou | 28 September 1990 (age 36) | Left Winger |
| 20 | Greece | Nikolaos Totos | 20 April 1999 (age 27) | Right Winger |
| 21 | Cyprus | Kypros Xenofontos | 7 April 1986 (age 40) | Goalkeeper |
| 23 | Cyprus | Marios Mina | 19 March 1986 (age 40) | Goalkeeper |
| 24 | Cyprus | Christos Hadjiefrem | 1 October 1980 (age 46) | Right Back |
| 25 | Cyprus | Andreas Chadjisavva | 25 May 1998 (age 28) | Central Back |
| 26 | Greece | Konstantinos Mimikos | 19 February 1997 (age 29) | Line Player |
| 33 | Cyprus | Demetris Botsaris | 23 June 1992 (age 34) | Left Back |
| 47 | Brazil | Bruno Oliveira Rodrigues | 13 October 1997 (age 29) | Right Back |
| 69 | Cyprus | Andreas Ioannou | 10 February 1989 (age 37) | Left Back |
| 71 | Greece | Efstathios Kesidis | 7 February 1992 (age 34) | Line Player |
| 98 | Cyprus | Charalampos Papatryfonos | 5 October 1987 (age 39) | Left Back |
| 99 | Cyprus | Giorgios Christodoulou | 11 October 1993 (age 33) | Right Winger |

== Titles ==
- Cypriot First Division
  - Winner (4) : 2021, 2022, 2023, 2024
- Cypriot Cup
  - Winner (4) : 2021, 2022, 2023, 2024
- Cypriot Super Cup
  - Winner (2) : 2023, 2024
- EHF European Cup
  - Semifinalist (1) : 2021

== EHF ranking ==
As of 05/12/2025

| Rank | Team | Points |
|---|---|---|
| 68 | (Norway) Drammen HK | 76 |
| 69 | (Poland) Górnik Zabrze | 74 |
| 70 | (Hungary) Balatonfüredi KSE | 73 |
| 71 | (Cyprus) Anorthosis Famagusta | 72 |
| 72 | (Iceland) Haukar | 72 |
| 73 | (Slovenia) MRK Krka | 72 |
| 74 | (Austria) UHK Krems | 71 |

== Former club members ==
=== Notable former players ===
- (Cyprus) Marios Efstathiadis (1985–1999, 2020–2021)
- (Cyprus) Christophoros Nungovitch (2021–2023)
- (Russia) Yegor Yevdokimov (2022-)
- (Slovenia) Domen Sikošek Pelko (2022–2023)

=== Former coaches ===
| Seasons | Coach | Country |
|---|---|---|
| –2020 | Constantinos Michael | (Cyprus) |
| 2020–2022 | Georgios Zaravinas | (Greece) |
| 2022–PRESENT | Marios Efstathiadis | (Cyprus) |
