= Cypriot Men's Handball Championship =

- Sport: Handball
- Founded: 1984
- No. of teams: 8
- Country: Cyprus
- Confederation: EHF
- Most recent champion: Anorthosis Famagusta
- Most titles: SPE Strovolos Nicosia (20 titles)
- International cups: EHF Cup; EHF Challenge Cup
- Website: http://www.chf.com.cy

The Cypriot A1 Andrón is the name of the highest level handball league of Cyprus.

== 2024/25 Season participants ==
The following 8 clubs compete in A1 Andrón during the 2024–25 season.

Team	City	Arena
Anorthosis Famagusta	Nicosia	Kition Athletic Center
APOEL Nicosia	Nicosia	Eleftheria Indoor Hall
EN Agia Varvara	Agia Varvara	
European University Cyprus	Nicosia	Eleftheria Indoor Hall
Mavrommatis Ayiou Pavlou	Nicosia	Eleftheria Indoor Hall
Proodeftikos Paphos	Paphos	Aphroditi Sports Hall
Parnassos Strovolou	Nicosia	Kyriacos Pissis
KN Agion Trimithias	Agioi Trimithias	

== A1 Andrón past champions ==
- 1984 : KN Anthoupolis
- 1985 : KN Anthoupolis (2)
- 1986 : KN Anthoupolis (3)
- 1987 : KN Anthoupolis (4)
- 1988 : KN Anthoupolis (5)
- 1989 : KN Anthoupolis (6)
- 1990 : KN Anthoupolis (7)
- 1991 : SPE Strovolos Nicosia
- 1992 : SPE Strovolos Nicosia (2)
- 1993 : SPE Strovolos Nicosia (3)
- 1994 : SPE Strovolos Nicosia (4)
- 1995 : SPE Strovolos Nicosia (5)
- 1996 : SPE Strovolos Nicosia (6)
- 1997 : SPE Strovolos Nicosia (7)
- 1998 : SPE Strovolos Nicosia (8)
- 1999 : SPE Strovolos Nicosia (9)
- 2000 : SPE Strovolos Nicosia (10)
- 2001 : SPE Strovolos Nicosia (11)
- 2002 : SPE Strovolos Nicosia (12)
- 2003 : SPE Strovolos Nicosia (13)
- 2004 : SPE Strovolos Nicosia (14)
- 2005 : European University Cyprus
- 2006 : SPE Strovolos Nicosia (15)
- 2007 : SPE Strovolos Nicosia (16)
- 2008 : European University Cyprus (2)
- 2009 : SPE Strovolos Nicosia (17)
- 2010 : SPE Strovolos Nicosia (18)
- 2011 : SPE Strovolos Nicosia (19)
- 2012 : European University Cyprus (3)
- 2013 : European University Cyprus (4)
- 2014 : SPE Strovolos Nicosia (20)
- 2015 : European University Cyprus (5)
- 2016 : European University Cyprus (6)
- 2017 : European University Cyprus (7)
- 2018 : European University Cyprus (8)
- 2019 : Parnassos Strovolou (1)
- 2020 : Parnassos Strovolou (2)
- 2021 : Anorthosis Famagusta (1)
- 2022 : Anorthosis Famagusta (2)
- 2023 : Anorthosis Famagusta (3)
- 2024 : Anorthosis Famagusta (4)
- 2025 : Anorthosis Famagusta (5)
- 2026 : Anorthosis Famagusta (6)

	Club	Titles	Year
1.	SPE Strovolos Nicosia	20	1991, 1992, 1993, 1994, 1995, 1996, 1997, 1998, 1999, 2000, 2001, 2002, 2003, 2004, 2006, 2007, 2009, 2010, 2011, 2014
2.	European University Cyprus	8	2005, 2008, 2012, 2013, 2015, 2016, 2017, 2018
3.	KN Anthoupolis	7	1984, 1985, 1986, 1987, 1988, 1989, 1990
4.	Anorthosis Famagusta	6	2021, 2022, 2023, 2024, 2025, 2026
5.	Parnassos Strovolou	2	2019, 2020

== EHF coefficient ranking ==
For season 2017/2018, see footnote

- 33. (31) (Italy) Serie A (3.50)
- 33. (35) (Bulgaria) GHR A (3.50)
- 35. (33) (Cyprus) A1 Andrón (3.00)
- 36. (38) (Moldova) Divizia Națională (2.00)
- 36. (39) (United Kingdom) Super 8 (2.00)
