= Paris School of Business =

Business school in Paris and Rennes

Coordinates: 48°49′31.59″N 2°21′59.613″E

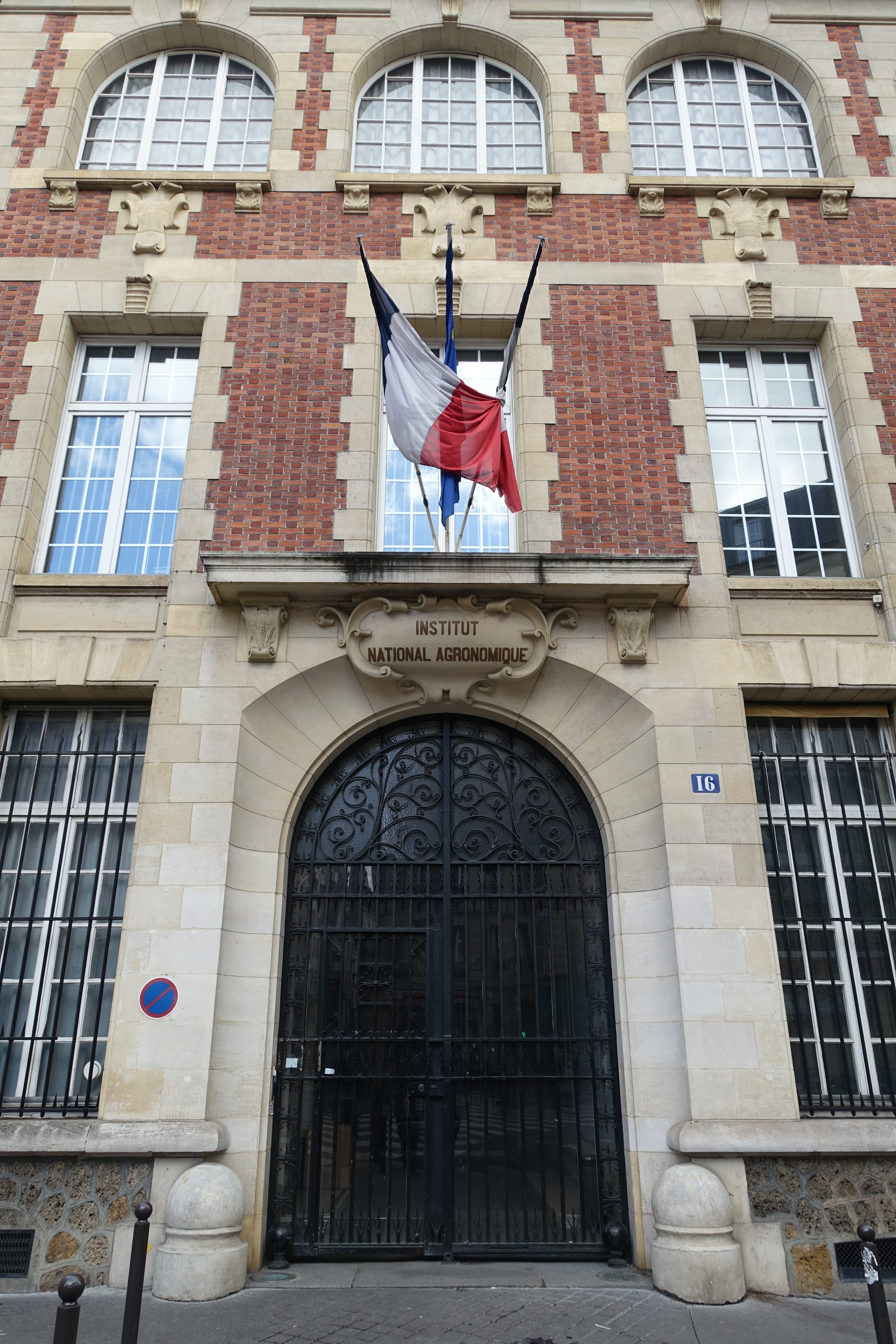
- Motto: Acting beyond Knowledge
- Type: Business school
- Established: 1974
- Dean: Armand Derhy
- Academic staff: 85
- Students: 3000
- Location: Paris and Rennes, France
- Affiliations: AMBA, AACSB, CGE, EFMD
- Website: psbedu.paris

The Paris School of Business (PSB), formerly ESG Management School, is a business school and a grande école located in Paris and Rennes in France. It offers BBA, MBA, MSc, MIM, DBA, and executive education courses in English and French.

PSB is a member of the Conférence des Grandes Écoles. It is accredited by the Association to Advance Collegiate Schools of Business (AACSB) and the Association of MBAs, and it has programme accreditation from the European Foundation for Management Development for its Master in Management course.

== Presentation ==
The Paris School of Business is located in Paris and Rennes. It provides both typical French higher education programs and offers courses entirely taught in English. There are more than 3,000 students in the school, from Bachelor to Doctorate levels.

Until 2015, PSB was part of Groupe ESG, a network of seven business schools in Paris with a combined alumni of 26,000. It is now part of Europe’s largest higher education provider, Galileo Global Education, along with Regent's University London, the Istituto Marangoni, the European University Cyprus, the Universidad de Ciencias Médicas and the PFH Private University of Applied Sciences.

Between 2021 and 2024, the school was a member of Hautes Écoles Sorbonne Arts et Métiers University (HESAM), a public university system based in Paris, as part of a public-private partnership.

== Accreditations and Rankings ==
Accreditations for PSB Paris School of Business are CIMA (Chartered Institute of Management Accountants), PMI (Project Management Institute), AMBA, and CGE. In 2019, Master in Management, the Grande Ecole Master Programme, has received the EPAS accreditation. As of February 2020, the school obtained the AACSB accreditation.

In 2022, the Financial Times ranks the Masters in Management program 95th in the world. The MBA programs have received recognition from SMBG Eduniversal in 2011 which ranked its full-time MBA program number 8 among those in France requiring no work experience and from CEO Magazine (the magazine publication of International Graduate Forum) in 2012 which ranked it as a "tier one" MBA school.

== International partnerships ==
Students of the International MBA program can optionally include a period of study at a number of partner institutions, including

- Clark University, United States
- Griffith University, Australia
- Macquarie University, Australia
- Suffolk University, United States
- Tel Aviv University, Israel
- Universidad Anáhuac México, Mexico
- University of Arizona, United States

== Publications ==
The PSB Paris School of Business has also published a series of three books on business management with the L'Harmattan collection called "Un autre regard" which can be translated as "Another look" or "A different perspective".

== Notable teacher ==
- Frédéric Encel, French writer and scholar of geopolitics
