= Code monkey =

Code monkey may refer to:

- A pejorative term for programmers who are employed to write simple or repetitive code.
- Code Monkeys, an animated television series.
- "Code Monkey" (song), by Jonathan Coulton.
- CodeMonkey (software), an educational computer environment.

== See also ==
- Cowboy coder
