= Cabotage =

Transport within a country by an operator from another country

Cabotage (/ˈkæbətɪdʒ, -tɑːʒ/) is the transport of goods or passengers between two places in the same country by a carrier registered in a different country. The term originally applied to shipping along coastal routes, port to port, but now applies to aviation, railways, and road transport as well. Most countries do not permit cabotage, and there are strict sanctions against it, for reasons of economic protectionism, national security, or public safety. One notable exception is the European Union, whose member states all grant cabotage rights to each other.

== Etymology ==
The term "cabotage" is borrowed from French. It is derived from caboter which means "to travel along the coast". The origin of caboter is from Persian language or it may come from cap or cabo "cape", or it may refer to a type of boat. Attempts to link the word to the Italian explorer John Cabot are not supported by evidence.

== In shipping ==
Cabotage laws apply to merchant ships in most countries that have a coastline so as to protect the domestic shipping industry from foreign competition, preserve domestically owned shipping infrastructure for national security purposes, and ensure safety in congested territorial waters. As of 2025, 105 countries had such laws, representing 85% of the United Nations member states with coastlines. This was an increase from 91 countries in 2018.

For the history of cabotage in UK law, see Navigation Acts.

Indonesia implemented a cabotage policy in 2005 after previously allowing foreign-owned vessels to operate relatively freely within the country.

In the Philippines, the Tariff and Customs Code of the Philippines (Republic Act No. 1937) which is also known as the Cabotage Law restricts coastwise trade or the transport of passengers and goods within the country, to vessels with Philippine registry which has to secure a coastwise licence from the Maritime Industry Authority. After the passage of Foreign Ships Co-Loading Act or the Republic Act No. 10668 in 2015, foreign vessels with cargo intended to be exported out of the country may dock in multiple ports in the country before transiting to a foreign port.

China does not permit foreign flagged vessels to conduct domestic transport or domestic transhipments without the prior approval of the Ministry of Transport. However, this rule does not apply to Hong Kong as it is considered a "foreign" port, which benefits it remaining attractive as a hub.

In the EU, rights to cabotage in newly admitted member states (in particular, Greece, Spain and Portugal) were restricted; but this introductory provision was abandoned after criticism in the light of the Paros ferry disaster.

The Hague–Visby Rules, a convention which imposes duties on maritime carriers, apply only to "carriage of goods by sea between ports in two different states", and thus do not apply to cabotage shipping. However, section 1(3) of the UK Carriage of Goods by Sea Act 1971 declares that the Rules "shall have effect … where the port of shipment is a port in the United Kingdom, whether or not the carriage is between ports in two different States …".

=== United States ===
In the United States, the Merchant Marine Act of 1920 (Jones Act) requires that all goods transported by water between U.S. ports be carried on ships that have been constructed in the United States, and fly the U.S. flag, are owned by U.S. citizens, and crewed by U.S. citizens and permanent residents. The Passenger Vessel Services Act of 1886 states that no foreign vessels shall transport passengers between ports or places in the United States, either directly, or by way of foreign ports.

A vessel satisfies the "U.S. built" requirement if:

- "all major components of its hull (Note: A component is "major" if it exceeds 1.5 percent of the vessel's steelweight. A component is deemed part of the hull if it forms part of the watertight envelope of the vessel.") and superstructure are fabricated in the United States"
- assembly of the vessel occurs "entirely in the United States."

The requirements of the Jones Act apply to transport between:

- all points in the territorial sea, within three miles of the coast,
- points in internal waters of the United States,
- the island territories and possessions of the United States.
- pursuant to the Outer Continental Shelf Lands Act, the requirements also apply to structures attached to the American outer continental shelf for the purpose of exploration, development, or production of natural resources.

== In passenger aviation ==
Cabotage rights remain rare in passenger aviation. The Chicago Convention prohibits member states from granting cabotage on an exclusive basis, which has limited the availability of cabotage as a bargaining chip in bilateral aviation agreement negotiations. Cabotage is not granted under most open skies agreements.

=== Australia and New Zealand ===
The Closer Economic Relations agreement allows Australian air carriers to fly domestically and internationally from New Zealand and vice versa. An Australian carrier, Jetstar (a Qantas subsidiary), flies domestic routes within New Zealand. Air New Zealand offers one international destination from Australia outside New Zealand, flying between Sydney, Australia and Rarotonga of the Cook Islands. Previously, Qantas Jetconnect, Pacific Blue (a Virgin Australia subsidiary) and Ansett New Zealand were Australian-owned airlines based in New Zealand that operated domestic New Zealand services. Similarly, Air New Zealand operated two domestic routes in Australia, between Sydney & Brisbane, Australia and Norfolk Island, Australia; this was suspended due to Air New Zealand staffing issues related to COVID-19 border closures in 2021, being taken over by Australian carrier Qantas, initially on a temporary basis, but ongoing as of 2025.

Australia also permits foreign-owned airlines incorporated under Australian law (such as the domestic arm of Virgin Australia) to operate on domestic routes, although it prohibits such airlines from operating international routes as Australian flag carriers. They can, however still operate international routes if they are operated by an Australian-owned subsidiary.

=== Chile ===
Chile has the most liberal cabotage rules in the world, enacted in 1979, which allow foreign airlines to operate domestic flights, conditional upon reciprocal treatment for Chilean carriers in the foreign airline's country. This unusual regime is partly due to Chile's geographical need for air service, and partly to incentivize liberalization in other countries amid the international expansion of its flag carrier LATAM Chile, which now has major operations in many other Latin American countries. Like Australia, Chile allows foreign companies to set up Chilean subsidiaries to offer domestic flights in Chile, regardless of reciprocity.

=== European Union ===
Carriers licensed under EU law are permitted to engage in cabotage in any EU member state, with some limitations. Ryanair, easyJet, Vueling, Wizz Air, and Aer Lingus have bases and operate domestic services outside their home countries.

=== United States ===
Foreign-registered aircraft are prohibited from carrying passengers or cargo between points in the US, except as part of a through trip involving travel to or from a foreign point. In order to fly between points within the US, at least one leg of the trip must be booked on a US airline.

=== Other examples ===
Before 1991, Lufthansa was prohibited from flying to West Berlin, so Pan Am, British Airways, and Air France operated the routes between West Germany and West Berlin. For a short time in the late 1980s, Trans World Airlines also flew between then-West Germany and West Berlin. During this time, Pan Am flew to Tegel, in Berlin, from Munich-Riem Airport (now closed), Hamburg and Frankfurt. Air France flew from Düsseldorf. British Airways flew from Münster-Osnabrück, Hannover, and some other cities.

In 2003–2004, the United States Department of Transportation authorized Polynesian Airlines to provide temporary cabotage service in American Samoa after all US-flagged airlines ceased operations in the region, one of very few instances where the US has granted cabotage rights in an emergency.

In October 2007, the United Kingdom granted Singapore carriers the right to fly domestic UK routes as part of an open skies agreement, which also allows British carriers to fly to any city from Singapore.

Reciprocal cabotage rights exist by treaty between New Zealand and Brunei, and between the People's Republic of China and Albania.

In 2024, due to western sanctions on its aviation industry, Russia sent cabotage proposals to "friendly countries" such as India and China, in the hope that airlines from these countries can operate domestic routes in Russia to mitigate its airplane shortage.

== In road transport ==
The European Union allows limited cabotage for road transport. After delivering the goods of an incoming international carriage, a haulier holding a Community licence may carry out up to three cabotage operations in the host member state with the same vehicle, provided that the last unloading takes place within seven days of the last unloading of the international carriage. Since 21 February 2022, the same vehicle may not carry out further cabotage in that member state within four days after the end of its cabotage operations there. Since 2 February 2022, a driver performing cabotage operations is considered a posted worker under the Posted Workers Directive, and the operator must submit a posting declaration through the public interface of the Internal Market Information System at the latest when the posting starts.

== Related concepts ==
=== "Modified sixth freedom" ===
The "modified sixth freedom" refers to the right to carry passengers between two points in country A through a hub in country B; for instance, a Boston-Toronto-Seattle itinerary. Such services are currently considered to constitute cabotage and are not permitted. In 2002, the United States fined Asiana Airlines for selling tickets from the mainland US to Guam and Saipan via Seoul.

=== Tag rights ===
Certain airlines operate services within a foreign country without the right to carry local traffic. For instance, until the onset of the COVID-19 pandemic in 2020, Qantas operated service between New York and Los Angeles solely for use by international connecting passengers. Such services are not generally considered to be cabotage.
