= Galileo Global Education =

French group specialized in private higher education

Galileo Global Education S.A.
- Type: Private
- Industry: For-profit education
- Predecessor: Studialis
- Founded: 2012; 14 years ago
- Founder: Providence Equity
- Headquarters: Paris, France
- Key people: Marc-François Mignot Mahon (CEO); Martin Hirsch (executive vice-president); Marc Lefebvre (vice-chairman); Muriel Pénicaud (member of the board of directors)
- Subsidiaries: Regent's University London; Paris School of Business; Istituto Marangoni; European University Cyprus; Universidad de Ciencias Médicas; PFH Private University of Applied Sciences
- Website: www.ggeedu.com

Galileo Global Education S.A. is Europe’s largest for-profit higher education provider, with over 200 private colleges (or écoles), universities and campuses around the world and its head office in Paris, France. It claims to be number one in Europe, but ranks behind Chinese groups such as TAL Education Group and New Oriental worldwide.

The company owns and operates several higher-learning institutions, including the Regent's University London, the Macromedia University, the Paris School of Business, the Istituto Marangoni or the European University Cyprus, and almost 40% of EM Lyon Business School.

== History ==
=== 2011: Creation of the group by US fund Providence Equity ===
Galileo Global Education was created when the American investment fund Providence Equity acquired Istituto Marangoni (Italy) in 2011, and began to expand by acquiring public schools from a variety of backgrounds in France, Germany, Mexico and elsewhere. At the same time, Studialis, a French higher education group, is expanding and acquiring schools in a range of sectors: management, IT, arts and crafts, etc.

=== 2016: acquisition of Studialis ===
In 2016, Galileo Global Education acquired Studialis, formerly Eductis, for €250 million. Studialis will be renamed Galileo Global Education France in July 2023.

In April 2018, Téthys Invest, a subsidiary of the Bettencourt Meyers family's holding company, became a reference shareholder in the Galileo Global Education group and sits on the Board of Directors alongside the American investment fund Providence Equity, the majority shareholder.

=== 2020: sale to the Bettencourt Meyers family and Bpifrance ===
On 13 February 2020, US investment fund Providence Equity announced the sale of its majority stake in the Galileo Global Education group for an estimated €2.3 billion. The Group was sold in March 2020 to a shareholder group comprising Téthys Invest, the holding company of the Bettencourt-Meyers family, Bpifrance, the Canada Pension Plan Investment Board and Montagu Private Equity. The group is managed by international investment funds.

In 2020, Galileo Global Education acquires Regent's University London.

In 2021, the Group acquired IPETH, a physiotherapy school in Mexico, as well as LMA and Health Events, and created the Eva Santé school in France, a training institute for care assistants.

In 2022, Galileo Global Education created ELIJE, a law school in Paris, and acquired AKAD University in Germany and TAI School of Arts in Spain. That same year, the Group acquired a 40% stake in EM Lyon Business School, consistently ranked among the best business schools in Europe.

In Costa Rica, Galileo Global Education includes the Universidad de Ciencias Médicas (UCIMED), founded in 1976 and the oldest and largest private medical school in the country, which joined the group making it the only medical institution in the GGE network in Central America.

== Organization ==
=== Locations ===
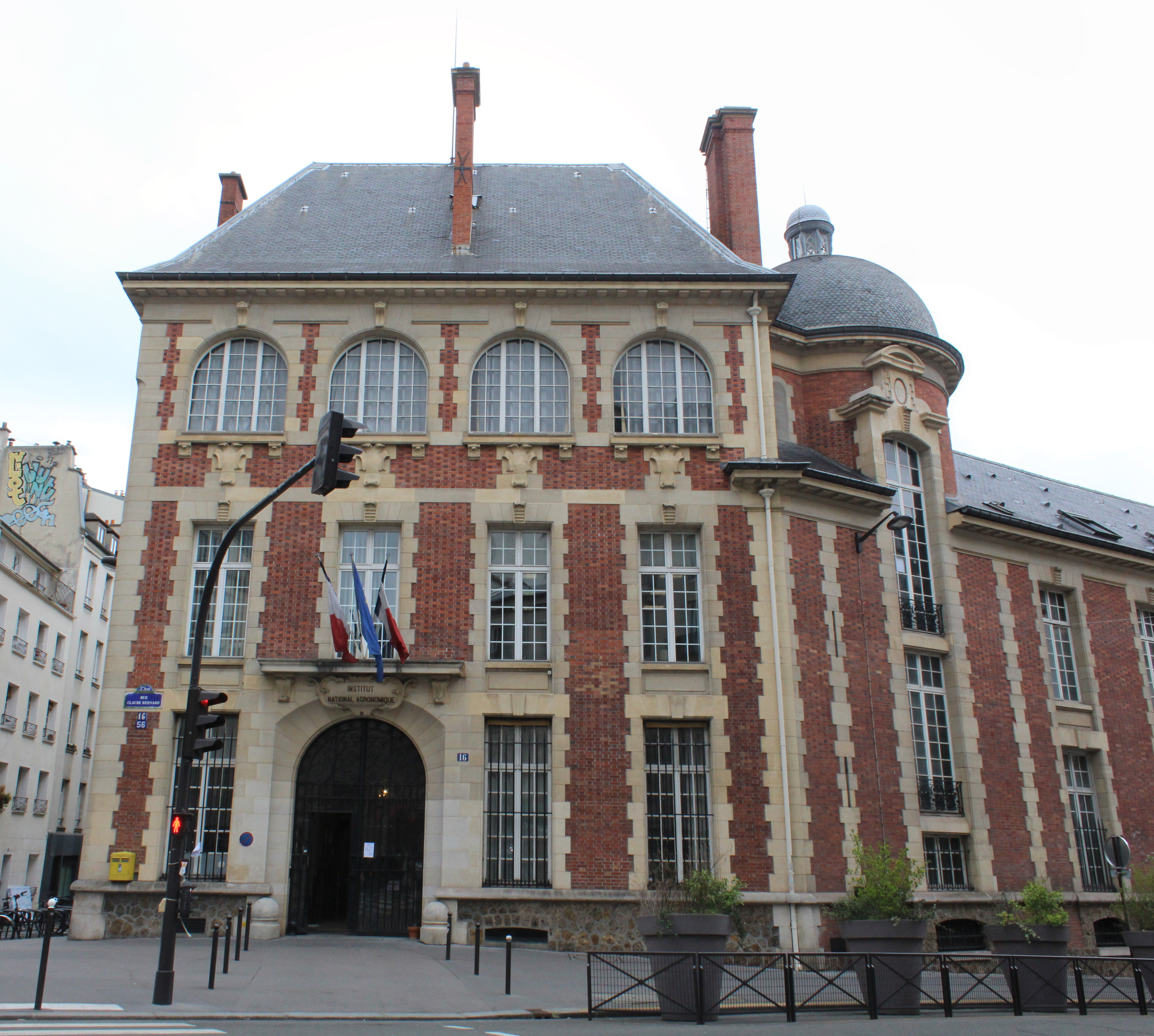
The site in Paris where several Galileo Global Education schools are due to be located in 2025.

The Galileo Global Education group comprises more than 50 private colleges and universities, and 106 campuses in 15 countries. It sells courses to 200,000 students, more than 50% of them in France, and more than 50% online.

In 2025, Galileo Global Education is to bring together its Paris schools, including the Paris School of Business, Cours Florent and Penninghen, on the Claude-Bernard Campus, the former site of AgroParisTech, at 16, rue Claude-Bernard in the 5th arrondissement of Paris.

=== Colleges and universities ===
==== Costa Rica ====
- Universidad de Ciencias Médicas (San Jose)

==== Cyprus ====
- European University Cyprus (Nicosia)

==== France ====
- Atelier de Sèvres (Paris)
- Paris School of Business (Paris, Rennes)
- Paris School of Technology & Business https://www.pstb.fr (Paris)
- Strate School of Design (Sèvres, Lyon, Bangalore, Singapore)
- Cours Florent (Paris, Montpellier, Bordeaux, Brussels)
- ELIJE Law School (Paris)
- Eva Health (Metz)
- Penninghen School of Interior Architecture (Paris)
- LISAA School of Art & Design (Paris, Bordeaux, Nantes, Rennes and Strasbourg)
- Institut Culinaire de France (Bordeaux and Paris)
- Institut d'Études Supérieures des Arts - IESA (Paris)
- Bellecour School (Lyon)
- Institut Technique du Maquillage - ITM (Paris)
- CIFACOM and CIFAP (Montreuil)
- Conservatoire Libre du Cinéma et de la Fiction - CLCF (Paris)
- ESARC Evolution (Aix-en-Provence, Toulouse, Bordeaux, and Montpellier)
- École Supérieure de Gestion - ESG (Aix-en-Provence, Bordeaux, Lyon, Montpellier, Nantes, Rennes, Rouen, Strasbourg, Toulouse, Tours, Dijon, and Biarritz)
- Digital Campus (Bordeaux, Lyon, Montpellier, Rennes, Toulouse, Nantes, Le Port and Dakar)
- Narratiiv School of Mass Communication, Journalism and Creation (Paris)
- HETIC IT School (Montreuil)
- The Web School Factory (Paris

==== Germany ====
- Macromedia University of Applied Sciences (Berlin, Cologne, Freiburg im Breisgau, Hamburg and Stuttgart)
- PFH Private University of Applied Sciences (Göttingen and Stade)
- European University Cyprus (Frankfurt)

==== Italy ====
- Nuova Accademia di Belle Arti (Milan)
- Domus Academy (Milan)
- Istituto Marangoni (Milan, Florence, London, Paris, etc.)

==== Mexico ====
- Universidad IEU (Puebla, Acapulco, Campeche, Cancún, Chilpancingo, Coatzacoalcos, etc.)
- Instituto Profesional en Terapias y Humanidades - IPETH (Mexico City, Puebla, Guadalajara, State of Mexico & Guatemala)

==== Norway ====
- Noroff University College

==== United Kingdom ====
- Regent's University London
- Liverpool Media Academy (Liverpool and London)

==== Sweden ====
- Nackademin University of Applied Sciences (Solna, Stockholm County)

==== Senegal ====
- Institut Supérieur de Management (Dakar)

=== Business model ===
The international investment funds that are shareholders in Galileo Global Education are aiming for financial profitability in a market that was structured in the 2000s and is still perceived as profitable, and even as promising. While Bpifrance's (the French Public Investment Bank) support for the group does not allow it to influence its strategy, it does provide shareholders with an incentive.

The Group's use of online training, as with its subsidiary Studi, guarantees high profitability, since the formula saves on premises and reduces the number of teachers.

Sociologist and economist Aurélien Casta estimated in 2022 that families know little or nothing about the role of investment funds in private colleges (écoles) and grandes écoles in France, despite the fact that the country is one of the most developed in terms of private for-profit higher education.

Its competitors in France include the Ionis Education Group and Omnes Education groups.

=== Shareholding ===
Galileo Global Education shareholders at 6 March 2020
Name	Stake
Bettencourt-Meyers Family (Téthys Invest)	37 %
CPP Investments (CPPIB)	37 %
Montagu Private Equity	17 %
Bpifrance	9 %

== Lobbying ==
Galileo Global Education has been registered as an interest representative with the Haute Autorité pour la Transparence de la Vie Publique since February 2021. In 2022, the company will declare expenses of less than €50,000 for this activity.

== Controversial issues ==
In February 2023, the group was the target of an investigation by the French newspaper Libération into ‘the underbelly of an educational business that prospers thanks to the laissez-faire attitude of the state’.

In 2024, the French public television channel France 2's programme Complément d'Enquête gave the floor to a Galileo executive who said that financial interests were more important than educational ones. The report also examines the links between Muriel Pénicaud and the group, with the former French Minister for Employment now a board member.

== See also ==
- Tertiary education
- Continuing education
- Dual education system
