= Stalin Note =

1952 communication by Joseph Stalin

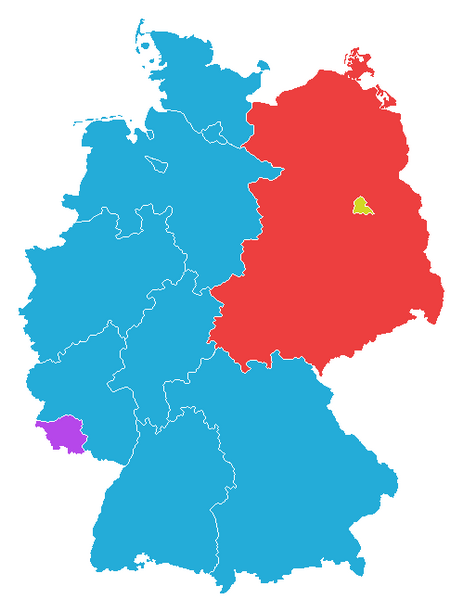
Germany in 1952: the Federal Republic (West) in blue, DDR (East) in red, West Berlin in yellow, and the Saar Protectorate in purple.

Stalin in 1950

The Stalin Note (German: Stalin-Noten; French: Note de Staline; Russian: Нота Сталина, romanized: Nota Stalina), also known as the March Note or Peace Note (мирная нота, mirnaya nota), was a diplomatic note delivered to the representatives of the Western Allies (the United Kingdom, France, and the United States) from the Soviet Union in separated Germany including the two countries in West and East on 10 March 1952. Soviet general secretary and premier Joseph Stalin put forth a proposal for a German reunification and neutralisation with no conditions on economic policies and with guarantees for "the rights of man and basic freedoms, including freedom of speech, press, religious persuasion, political conviction, and assembly" and free activity of democratic parties and organizations.

Conservative CDU/CSU West German Chancellor Konrad Adenauer and the Western Allies characterized Stalin's offer of reintegration as an aggressive action that attempted to stall the reintegration of West Germany. The readmission of 18.5 million eastern German citizens in the GDR to the voter rolls would have pulled West Germany's 51 million citizens leftward politically. There was debate on whether a legitimate chance for reunification had been missed; six years after the exchange, two West German ministers, Thomas Dehler and Gustav Heinemann, blamed Adenauer for not having explored the chance of reunification.

There is ongoing debate over the sincerity of the note, though declassified documents from the former Soviet archives indicate that there was an intention to incorporate the German Democratic Republic into the Eastern bloc and to blame the division of Germany on the Western occupying powers.

== Background ==
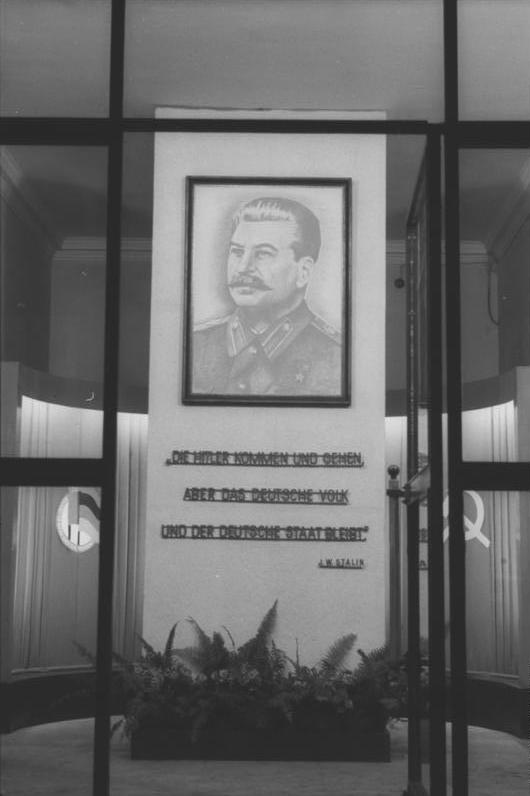
"Hitlers come and go, but the German people and the German state remain." A quote by Stalin on the post-Nazi development of Germany depicted on a stele in Berlin.

After the Second World War ended, Germany was divided into what became eventually a Western Zone and an Eastern Zone. By 1949, Germany had a parliamentary democracy in the West, called the Federal Republic of Germany (FRG, commonly "West Germany"), and a communist state in the East, called the German Democratic Republic (GDR, commonly "East Germany"). Opportunities to reunify both halves appeared unlikely from the Western standpoint. The Socialist Unity Party of Germany (SED) feared losing power if free elections were held. Germany had still not signed a peace treaty for the war because of animosity between the three Western Powers and the Soviet Union. The peace treaty with Germany, the Two Plus Four Agreement, was signed only in 1990.

In early 1950, the United States began negotiations for a peace treaty with Japan, which granted long-term US military bases in Japan. The Korean War (1950–1953) surprised the US and contributed to deteriorated relations between the US and the Soviet Union during the Cold War.

In discussions on reunification, East Germany stressed the importance of a peace treaty, while West Germany focused on the importance of free elections for all of Germany. West German Chancellor Konrad Adenauer did not believe that reunification was possible under the given conditions. He and his administration pursued a course that allied West Germany with the Western Bloc, particularly in relationship to military policy. Specifically, Adenauer felt that West Germany should maintain an army, which could be integrated into a larger West European military force. The European Defence Community Treaty was signed in May 1952, after the rejection of the Stalin Note, but the proposed European Defence Community never came into being because the treaty was rejected by the French National Assembly.

Stalin and East Germany condemned the treaty, although East Germany had created a pseudo-military force called the Kasernierte Volkspolizei. The Stalin Notes could be seen as a way to draw out the East German propaganda efforts so that reunification would fail.

On 15 September 1951, East Germany offered to discuss holding elections at a meeting with West Germany. However, West Germany refused to hold talks with the SED because that would have meant the actual recognition of East Germany as an equal country. Contact was always maintained through the Western Powers. Instead, West Germany wanted a commission of the United Nations to see if free all-German elections were possible.

The endeavours of the Western Powers made the commission meet in December 1951. East Germany refused to let it enter, however, and stated that the possibility of free elections should be investigated by a commission of the four occupying powers.

== First Stalin Note ==
At a conference in Paris, the SED emphasised the importance of the two German states discussing a potential peace treaty. The Soviet leaders also encouraged the discussion of a peace treaty with the Western Powers because they were afraid of the push for the integration of the West German armed forces into a larger Western coalition.

East Germany appealed to the four powers to allow for negotiations of the peace treaty for Germany. After about two months, in August 1951, Stalin presented his first draft of the plan for a peace treaty. After working through numerous corrections and basic conceptual changes, the final version was ready seven months later.

On 10 March 1952, Andrei Gromyko gave a diplomatic note about the solution of the "German problem" to representatives of the three western occupiers (the United States, the United Kingdom and France) and called for a four-power conference. The note included the following points:

- A peace treaty with all participants in the war with Germany should be negotiated with a single united German government. The Allies must agree on its formation.
- Germany would be re-established as a united state within the boundaries established by the provisions of the Potsdam Conference.
- All occupation forces would be withdrawn within one year of the date that treaty came into effect.
- Germany would have democratic rights, such as having freedom of assembly, freedom of the press, and freedom to have a multi-party system, including for former members of the Nazi Party in the German armed forces, except for those under criminal prosecution.
- Germany would become officially neutral and not enter any kind of coalition or military alliance directed against any of the countries whose military forces had participated in the war against it.
- Germany would have access to world markets without restrictions.
- Germany could have its own national armed forces to defend it and also manufacture munitions for those forces.

=== West German reaction ===
West Germany's priorities were different from East Germany's. Chancellor Adenauer considered his main priority to be the integration of West Germany into the West, and he saw reunification as a rather abstract goal. Specifically, his administration wanted to focus on the re-establishment of Germany into a capitalist Europe, and he felt that reunification was not possible until West Germany was securely established in Western Europe. He even believed that reunification could happen only at the same time as a radical change in Eastern Europe. If the integration of West Germany into the Western Alliance could not be managed, West Germany would come under the influence of the Soviet Union.

He felt that Germany alone would not be able to afford an army that could provide for the security of a neutral Germany. Thus, he assumed that two German states would co-exist for an indeterminate amount of time and he followed that goal in the background. For those reasons, Adenauer saw the note as an annoyance and wanted to continue proceedings with the Western Powers as if the note had not existed.

Adenauer's view that Stalin's offer was not serious was widely shared. However, there were other views about how to react to the offer. The Minister of All-German Affairs, Jakob Kaiser, had a "bridge theory" which suggested that Germany could be the mediator between the East and the West. He agreed with Adenauer about the importance of free elections and the refusal of the Potsdam borders, but Kaiser took the Soviet offer very seriously. In a radio address on 12 March 1952, he stated that the note had an important political significance, but he still thought it was important to approach it with caution. He asked for the Soviet suggestions to be carefully explored so that no opportunity for reunification would be missed.

Similarly, other ministers and also members of the Free Democratic Party (FDP) felt that they should at least seriously test Stalin's proposal so that public opinion would not be that reunification failed because of West Germany. It would also quickly prove whether Stalin really meant to keep his offer; otherwise, his deceit would be quickly revealed.

However, Adenauer felt that a "test" would have significant disadvantages:

- A conference could be drawn out by the Soviet Union, and the relationship with the West would be delayed at first. If the West finally left the conference unnerved, Stalin could blame the failure of the talks on the West.
- Because of the Second World War and other events in German history, such as the 1922 Treaty of Rapallo, it was essential for West Germany to appear as a reliable partner to the West. Agreeing with the offer would destroy that impression.
- West Germany would participate in the conference with East Germany. The latter would thus be recognized by the West, which would allow Stalin to have already achieved one of his goals, without having given up anything in return.
- Even if Stalin's offer was meant seriously, according to the historian Andreas Hillgruber, Adenauer was worried about a neutral unified Germany. He believed that it would not act responsibly in such a difficult situation between the East and the West. Adenauer also shared that idea and thought that a neutral Germany could not defend itself alone from the Soviet Union.

Adenauer, his ministers, the opposing Social Democratic Party of Germany (SPD) and most of the population in West Germany agreed that Stalin's proposal was not sincere and that the demand for free elections had to be maintained. However, there was still some uneasiness that West Germany could not do anything against the division of Germany.

=== East German reaction ===
In East Germany, the note was officially received with excitement. The party organ of the SED, Neues Deutschland ("New Germany"), greatly emphasised that "the Soviet Government gives the patriotic forces of the German people the possibility of starting a wide offensive against the enemies of the peaceful reunification of Germany", ("patriotic forces" meant principally communist forces). This was largely a result of the strong and heavy Soviet influence in East Germany, whose leaders were subordinated to the Soviets and their political goals and ideological directions.

East German Prime Minister Otto Grotewohl, indicated how the draft treaty was interpreted by East Germany in a government declaration on 14 March. He described East Germany as a democratic and free state and West Germany as undemocratic and fascist. Anti-peace and anti-democratic groups, however, could not be allowed to exist in a united Germany. In addition, a united Germany had to orientate itself with the East German five-year plan.

Finally, Walter Ulbricht, the general secretary of the central committee of the SED, unmistakably spoke of the interpretation of the note. It should be understood as an action against the "general war treaty" (the Germany Treaty), through which Germany would become dependent on the West. However, Germany could not develop freely and peacefully except in a communist so-called "world peace bloc". In the end, East German goals for German reunification pressed on a sweeping communist reform on a unified Germany, which could be seen by at least a few in West Germany and the West as a ploy by Moscow to gain all of Germany into the communist fold.

=== Western response ===
The West was not completely surprised by the proposition offered by the March note because Stalin had not yet tried to interfere with the western integration of West Germany. However, the Western Powers did not want to begin negotiations with the Soviet Union until West Germany had been securely integrated into the West. Therefore, the western response was to delay the start of negotiations for the Peace Treaty.

After the foreign ministers of the Western Occupation had finished their response, they asked Adenauer for his opinion on the matter in case he had any small changes that he wished to make. Although he mistrusted the note, he asked that it not be outright rejected in the answer since he wanted to avoid creating the impression that the West had brusquely refused it.

On 25 March 1952, the first note from the British, French and American governments was sent to Moscow and included the following points:

- To begin negotiations on the Peace Treaty, the United Nations must check that all of Germany had free elections, which would then be held, and a government for all of Germany would finally be formed.
- The borders from Potsdam (the Oder-Neisse line) were rejected since they were to be in effect only until a peace treaty was worked out.
- Germany would have the right to enter into any alliances within the context of the UN Charter.
- There would be full western agreement for Germany to be integrated into a defensive European military alliance, which was understood to be a clear reference to the European Defence Community. An independent German military would be a step back into a Europe that had been controlled by militaristic and aggressive rivalry.

== Second Stalin Note ==
In the second Stalin Note, sent on 9 April 1952, the Soviet Union stood by its position that negotiations for the groundwork of a peace treaty and for the creation of a unified German government to begin. Stalin accepted that free elections could be the groundwork for a unified German government but insisted for the four occupying powers, rather than the United Nations, to supervise the elections. On the other hand, Stalin stayed firm on his idea for a reunified Germany to have the borders outlined by the Potsdam Conference and that even more generally, an armed Germany could not be in an alliance that was directed aggressively against other states.

In the second Western note of 13 May 1952, it was again emphasised that a freely-elected all-German government must participate in the treaty negotiations. Additionally, the West accepted that a commission of the occupying powers could oversee the elections but insisted for the commission not to be made up of government officials but impartial participants. The matter of dispute remained: free elections first (West) or peace treaty negotiations first (Soviet Union).

== Third Stalin Note ==
A day before the official signing of the European Defence Community (EDC), the Soviet Union sent a third note, on 24 May 1952. Stalin criticised the creation of the EDC, which – according to the Germany Treaty – should be in effect even after reunification, and accused the West of delaying the negotiations for a peace treaty. In addition, the all-German government must remain under the control of the occupying powers during the treaty negotiations.

The relative openness of the inner German border ended abruptly on 26 May 1952 when the GDR implemented a "special regime on the demarcation line", justified as a measure to keep out "spies, diversionists, terrorists and smugglers". The East German move was taken to limit the continuing exodus of its citizens, which threatened the viability of the GDR's economy.

On 10 July 1952, the West criticised the centralisation, the collectivisation and the changes in the East German justice system that the SED had passed. The note stated that the conference should not negotiate a peace treaty yet but decide on a commission to oversee the elections first. There was still a difference of opinion over whether Potsdam could be the basis for negotiation, which contradicted all of the developments since 1945.

== Fourth Stalin Note ==
On 23 August 1952, the Soviet Union sent its last note, which repeated its main positions and accusations. Although the Western Powers had conceded to allowing the occupying powers to oversee the elections, the Soviets suddenly refused any international election commission. Instead, both sides of Germany should be responsible for the creation of a commission with equal representation although the West had rejected that in 1951.

The West answered on 23 September 1952 with the repetition of its previous views and the renewal of its suggestion to form a nonpartisan commission of the four powers.

After the first Western note, the lack of success of the exchange of notes had already been internally determined in the East and the West. This view was also publicly expressed by the rather polemic contents of the last four notes. The signing of the two treaties with the West, on 26 May and 27 May 1952, emphasised it even more.

== Debate about "missed chance" ==
There have been several debates about whether a real chance for reunification had been missed in 1952. The publicist Paul Sethe and the historians Wilfried Loth, Josef Foschepoth, Karl-Gustav von Schönfels and especially Rolf Steininger belong to the sceptics. Their views are answered by Hermann Graml, Gerhard Wettig and Gottfried Niedhart. There are two main disputes:

- The more concrete question is easier to research and revolved around Stalin's motives and how ready he was to permit a neutralised democratic unified Germany and give up East Germany. Sceptics reject that, since a completely-independent Germany could be just as unpleasant in principle for Stalin as for the West. Besides, East Germany's existence had great advantages for Stalin:
  - As one of four occupying powers of the Second World War, the Soviets enjoyed prestige.
  - The Soviet right to occupy East Germany was generally recognised by the West.
  - East Germany was an important Soviet bridgehead in the middle of Europe, especially since Soviet troops had again left Czechoslovakia and Poland, the latter on the historically important 17 September. East Germany was important to hold the system of the Soviet satellite states together.
  - Because of its precarious situation, the East German leadership was mostly true vassals of the Soviet Union.
  - East Germany could be economically exploited and provide soldiers.
  - There was little to no comparison with Austria – from which the Soviet Union withdrew in 1955 following the Austrian State Treaty and the declaration of Austria's permanent neutrality – since Austria had less strategic and economic importance than Germany.
- A more political and more speculative question is whether such a Germany would have been more desirable. The sceptics noted:
  - Stalin could have still tried to subjugate all of Germany indirectly by reunification.
  - Without the Western Alliance, Stalin could have conquered Western European countries little by little, as Hitler had treated Germany's neighbours.
  - Without integration with the West, West Germany or all of Germany would have fared worse economically.

Above all, there is debate about the behaviour of West Germany and that of the Western Powers. The sceptics alleged repeatedly that Adenauer, who came from the mostly-Catholic Rhineland, did not want reunification with the mostly-Protestant Prussia. During the Weimar Republic, he had wanted an independent Rhineland within the German Empire, which was used against him.

Also, Adenauer could have had a political motive since many of the traditional supporters of the SPD were in the East. Unification would give Germany more Protestants and more Social Democrats than West Germany had.

In essence, the debate had two peaks: at the end of the 1950s and then again after the opening of the Western Powers' archives in the mid-1980s. Newer research since the 1990s has also taken into account the archives of the former Eastern Bloc and thus raised further discussion. Finally, a book on the analysis of the Stalin Notes was published in 2002. During reunification in 1989 and 1990, the debate about the Stalin Notes played no part.

=== Discussion in the 1950s ===
The American historian Ruud van Dijk remarked that in the later discussions, much more sincerity was attributed to Stalin than in 1952. The clearer it became that the chances for German reunification were dwindling, the stronger the debate about whether or not an important chance had been missed in 1952. According to Manfred Kittel, the discussion increased in extent as the chances for reunification decreased.

Among journalists, it was Paul Sethe who most sharply criticized Adenauer's rejection of Stalin's offer. He was the co-publisher of the Frankfurter Allgemeine Zeitung in the early 1950s and had always spoken out in his commentaries for at least seeing how serious the notes were. Thus, he saw the neutralisation of Germany as an appropriate price for reunification. He completed his thesis of missed chances in his book Von Bonn nach Moskau (From Bonn to Moscow) and so he lay the cornerstone for a debate about the notes that lasted for decades.

The idea of the missed chance received attention through a debate in the Bundestag on 23 January 1958. The CDU/CSU were in a government coalition with the small DP, when two former ministers asked to speak, Thomas Dehler (FDP) and Gustav Heinemann (first CDU, now SPD). Both of them had left the government in the dispute with Chancellor Adenauer and accused him of not having done enough for reunification.

=== Discussion in the 1980s ===
The debate came again in the 1980s, when the western archives were opened for historians. The archives of the Soviet Union and East Germany were still not accessible to researchers. The historian Rolf Steininger asked in his article "Eine Chance zur Wiedervereinigung?" ("A Chance for Reunification?") in 1985, which was based predominantly on Western sources, if an important chance had been missed. Steininger and others disputed if it would have led to a divided Germany and if Adenauer did the best possible thing. Steininger's argument was based on three assumptions:

- Stalin's offer was meant seriously.
- The Western powers intended to sound out Stalin's offer.
- Adenauer attempted to stop any attempt in that direction.

However, the historian Hermann Graml justified the actions of the Western Powers. Also on the basis of the western archives, he attached little importance to Adenauer's influence on the negotiations. Graml interpreted the note itself and the "planned" failure of the negotiations as evidence that the Soviet Union more or less wanted to create an alibi to push on East German integration to the Eastern Bloc.
