= Maria Lucia Hohan =

- Occupation: Fashion Designer

Maria Lucia Hohan is a Romanian fashion designer and entrepreneur. She is the creative director of the eponymous brand, established in 2003.

== Early life and education ==
Hohan was born in Romania. She studied at and graduated from the LISAA School of Art & Design in Paris.

== Career ==
Early in her career, she worked as a fashion illustrator for an Italian design house in Milan. In 2003, Maria Lucia Hohan opened her own studio in Bucharest. Under her namesake label, Maria Lucia created a new category of bridal and evening gowns.

Hohan began gaining international recognition once her creations were worn by names such as Beyonce, Katherine Heigl, Selena Gomez, Vanessa Hudgens, Nicole Kidman, Kelly Osbourne, Jennifer Lopez, Megan Fox, Taylor Swift, Rihanna, and Eva Longoria. Her brand, Maria Lucia Hohan, has since grown to operate internationally.

One of Hohan's designs was recognized by the 2022 NAACP Image Awards; her dress was worn by actress Logan Browning.

Hohan is sold by stores across the world in New York City, London, Milan, Rome, Dubai, Istanbul, São Paulo and Singapore.
