= Universidad de Ciencias Médicas =

Private medical university in Costa Rica

University of Medical Sciences
- Universidad de Ciencias Medicas
- Other name: UCIMED
- Motto: Excelencia académica por tradición
- Motto in English: Academic excellence by tradition
- Type: School of Medical Sciences
- Established: 1976
- Parent institution: Galileo Global Education
- Rector: Dra. María Del Carmen García González
- Location: La Sabana, San Jose, Costa Rica
- Language: Spanish
- Website: www.ucimed.com

The University of Medical Sciences (Spanish: Universidad de Ciencias Médicas, UCIMED) is a private medical university in San José, Costa Rica. It is the largest and oldest private medical school in Costa Rica. Currently the main campus is located in the country's capital. The university offers degrees such as Doctor of Medicine, Doctor of Microbiology and Clinical Chemistry, Licentiate of Physiotherapy, Licentiate of Nutrition and Doctor of Pharmacy. UCIMED also offers master's degrees and medical specialties such as a master's degree in Health Management and Specialty in Gynecology and Obstetrics.

It is now part of the Europe’s largest higher education provider Galileo Global Education, along with the Regent's University London, the Paris School of Business, the European University Cyprus or the PFH Private University of Applied Sciences.

== History ==
UCIMED was founded in 1976 by surgeon and researcher Andrés Vesalio Guzmán Calleja, who was one of the original founders of the national medical school of Costa Rica. It was originally named Escuela Autónoma de Ciencias Médicas (Autonomous School of Medical Sciences). It started as an initiative that was championed by Dr. Guzmán and collaborators as a response to ideological differences between the authorities of the national university of Costa Rica known as the University of Costa Rica (UCR), which was the only university who offered a medical degree. The conflict originated in part because in this particular time access to learn medicine was reserved to individuals with a specific ideological trend.

Initially the campus was based in the San Juan de Dios Hospital, using the infrastructure of the hospital's psychiatric wing. The emblem of the institution bears the dome of its first grounds at the hospital. At the beginning it served as the medical school of an established university known as UACA. However, in 1999 the medical school separated from its partnership with UACA and changed its name to UCIMED establishing itself as an independent institution. Three years later in March 2003, the National System of Accreditation in Higher Education, which monitors and verifies that higher education excellence standards are met nationally, granted UCIMED its accreditation in Medicine. UCIMED and UCR school of medicine were the only two institutions at the time to meet this standards.

In 1998 UCIMED introduced pharmacology as a major which now currently meets SINAES (Sistema Nacional de Acreditación de la Educación Superior) standards of quality. Later on, the programs of Microbiology, Physiotherapy and Nutrition were also included as part of the degrees offered. Currently, all of the degrees offered are accredited by SINAES, being one of the few universities in Costa Rica that achieves this. Moreover, in 2019 the university's medical school achieved an international accreditation by the Consejo Mexicano para la Acreditación de la Educación Médica (COMAEM), which guarantees the excellence of the academic education. At that time, UCIMED was the only Medical School in Latin America and the Caribbean to achieve this recognition.

== Academics and accreditation ==
All of the programs at UCIMED are semester-based and classes are taught in Spanish. Regarding the M.D. program, students who finish the first five semesters get a bachelor's degree in health sciences. At the fifth semester students start their clinical clerkships at hospitals from the Caja Costarricense de Seguridad Social such as the Hospital San Juan de Dios (Main General Hospital), Hospital México, Hospital Calderón Guardia, Hospital de Alajuela, Hospital de Heredia and Hospital Max Peralta de Cartago which are the main hospitals in Costa Rica; nevertheless, the university also has a wide network of access into secondary and tertiary care health infrastructure. Students rotate in various courses during their degree, such as semiology, internal medicine, surgery, psychiatry, pediatrics, OB/GYN and community medicine. In the last year, students do an internship in the country's hospitals. After finishing the eleventh semester, students who are in medical school obtain their MD degree.

It is the only medical school in Costa Rica with a fully equipped simulation hospital.

The university is part of the World Directory of Medical Schools from the World Health Organization.

== Admissions ==
The university requires students to do an admission test to apply. The admission test will measure the student's basic knowledge in some areas such as chemistry, biology and mathematics. Following this, applicants have to present their high-school transcripts and diploma. National and international students whose grades achieve the university's standards are granted an interview with a clinical psychologist and the dean of medicine or vice dean to provide counseling and assess motivation. If accepted, results are published on the university's web page.

== Agreement with Kaplan ==
UCIMED has signed an agreement with Kaplan, Inc. to help provide a program to prepare medical students for the USMLE and the NBME IFOM exam required for internship in the Costa Rican Healthcare System. This provides students with Educational Commission for Foreign Medical Graduates certificate with aid from Kaplan Inc. representatives working within UCIMED grounds. Kaplan Inc. USMLE preparation programs discounted for applicants who opt in.
