= Paul Sethe =

German writer and journalist (1901–1967)

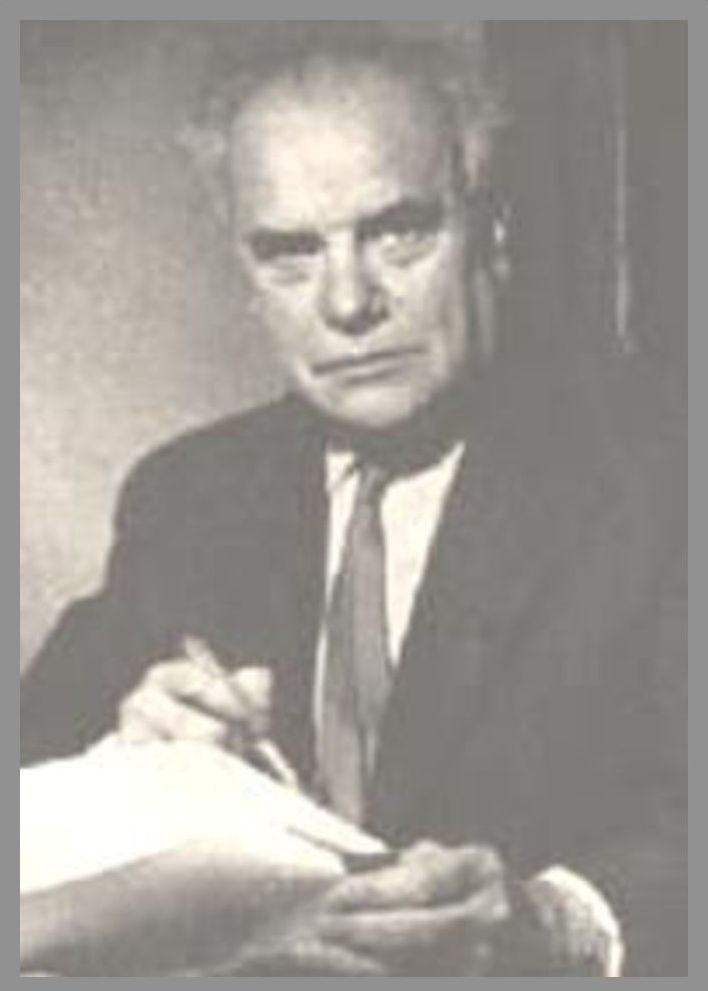
Paul Sethe

Paul Sethe (12 December 1901 – 21 June 1967) was a German writer and journalist.

== Life and work ==
Sethe studied history, German and art history at the University of Bonn. In 1932 he received his doctorate with thesis about the British naval command from 1911 to 1915: "The Missing Sea Battle". From 1934 until the newspaper was banned in 1943 by the Nazis, he was editor of the Frankfurter Zeitung. Carl Friedrich Goerdeler, one of the heads of the German resistance to Nazism, had suggested Sethe as the editor-in-chief of the newspaper that the Widerstand was planning to publish after the 20 July plot.

After World War II Sethe was one of the founding editors of the Frankfurter Allgemeine Zeitung, which developed very soon to the leading national newspapers in Germany. He announced his resignation 1955 because his co-editors did not share his critical opinion concerning the German foreign policy at that time. Afterwards he wrote for Die Welt, Die Zeit and Stern.

Paul Sethe was an active member of the Freemasonry.

In Berlin the Setheweg (Sethe-path) was named after him in 1980.

== Positions ==
Sethe was one of the leading journalists ("Doyen of German journalism", "grand old man of West German journalism") of the post-war era in Germany. He regarded his profession as the "conscience of the nation". He was considered conservative and wrote primarily about German politics and German history. He argued against one-sided ties to the West and for increased contact with the East, which brought him in conflict with the Federal Government and the mainstream at that time. He was a severe critic of Konrad Adenauer's foreign policy and advocated rapprochement with the East. Sethe always insisted on his opinion that there had been several "missed opportunities" of German politics, for example the Soviet March note of 1952 as a neglected starting point for reunification.

His most cited sentence comes from a letter to the editor in Der Spiegel on 4 May 1965: “Freedom of the press is the freedom of two hundred rich people to spread their opinions.”

== Publications ==
In addition to his journalistic activities, Sethe wrote a number of books and historical studies (very short selection):

- Im Banne der Grauen Eminenz (Under the spell of the gray eminence) Stuttgart: Franckh 1936.
- Schicksalsstunden der Weltgeschichte (Fateful hours in world history) Frankfurt: Scheffler 1952.
- Die großen Tage (The big days) Frankfurt: Scheffler 1953
- Epochen der Weltgeschichte (Epochs of world history) Frankfurt: Scheffler 1955
- A Short History of Russia. Chicago: Gateway Editions 1956
- Zwischen Bonn und Moskau (Between Bonn and Moscow) Frankfurt: Scheffler 1956.
- Die großen Entscheidungen (The big decisions) Frankfurt: Scheffler 1958
- Deutsche Geschichte im letzten Jahrhundert (German history in the last century) Frankfurt: Scheffler 1960.
- Morgenröte der Gegenwart (Dawn of the present) Stuttgart: Deutsche Verlagsanstalt 1963.
- Das Fundament unserer Zukunft (The foundation of our future) Düsseldorf: Econ 1964.
- Russische Geschichte (Russian history) Frankfurt: Scheffler 1965.
- Öffnung nach Osten (Opening to the east) Frankfurt: Scheffler 1966.
- In Wasser geschrieben (Written in water) Frankfurt: Scheffler 1968.
- Das machte Geschichte (That made history) Frankfurt: Scheffler 1969.
- Geschichte der Deutschen (History of the Germans) Frankfurt: Societäts-Verlag 1977.

== Sources ==
- Berghahn, Volker: "Journalists between Hitler and Adenauer" (Chapter Title: Paul Sethe: Resistance and Its Post- Hitler Moral and Journalistic Consequences), Princeton University Press 2019, DOI: https://doi.org/10.1515/9780691185071-002 (accessed 18 March 2021)
- "Letters to the editor". Der Spiegel. May 4, 1965.
- Fischer, Stefan: Süddeutsche Zeitung, Mai 10, 2020 "Paul Sethe, der Seher" (Paul Sethe, a conservative, anticipated Brandt's Ostpolitik) https://www.sueddeutsche.de/kultur/paul-sethe-xliii-der-seher-1.417226 (accessed 18 March 2021) Freimaurer online 5/2012: https://www.freimaurer.online/2012/05/von-think-tanks-und-bruckenbauern-axel-springer-und-sein-%C2%BBfreimaurerisches-geheimnis%C2%AB-%E2%80%93-ein-prominentes-lehrstuck/ (accessed 18 March 2021)
- Gründler, Gerhard: Remembering Paul Sethe Erinnerung an Paul Sethe (archive.org) 2010 (accessed 18 March 2021)
- Hamburger Logenblatt: "contents 1949–1975": https://docplayer.org/62458455-Inhaltsverzeichnis-hanseatisches-logenblatt-jahrgang-sortiert-nach-autor-autor-jahr-nr-seite-ordn-nr-titel.html
- Jung, Martin: "Sethe, Paul." In: New German Biography (NDB). Volume 24, Duncker & Humblot, Berlin 2010, ISBN 978-3-428-11205-0, p. 276 f. ( Digitized version: https://www.deutsche-biographie.de/sfz121358.html )
- Wilke, Jürgen: "Eine Insel der Freiheit" (an island of freedom), Frankfurter Allgemeine Zeitung 16 November 1916 https://www.faz.net/aktuell/eine-insel-der-freiheit-14530205.html
