= Josef Foschepoth =

German historian

- Born: 19 November 1947 (age 78); Werl, Allied-occupied Germany
- Education: University of Münster
- Scientific career
- Fields: Contemporary history

Josef Foschepoth (born 19 November 1947) is a German historian and a professor at the University of Freiburg. His research interest is the surveillance in post-WWII Germany.

== Biography ==
Foschepoth studied history, theology, and social sciences, and received his doctorate in 1975 from the Westphalian Wilhelms University in Münster with a thesis on the Reformation and the Peasants' War in the history of the GDR . After five years as a high school teacher at the Evangelisch Stiftisches Gymnasium Gütersloh, he became a research assistant and head of the new research area "Post-War History" at the German Historical Institute in London.

After his time in London, Foschepoth returned to Germany and held leading positions as director of the Ostakademie Königstein, was Secretary General of the German Coordination Council of the Societies for Christian-Jewish Cooperation (DKR) in Frankfurt, and Chief Urban Director in the cultural department of the city of Münster. From his work at the DKR, the book In the Shadow of the Past emerged, which dealt critically with the history of the DKR.

From 1997 to 2005 Foschepoth worked for the private AKAD Private Universities GmbH, first as managing director, then later as professor and rector of the AKAD University of Economics and Social Sciences in Lahr. He was also the founding board member of the Association of Private Universities in Germany.

== Selected publications ==
- ——— (1997). "German Reaction to Defeat and Occupation". In Moeller, R. G. (ed.). West Germany under Reconstruction. Politics, Society and Culture in the Adenauer Era. University of Michigan Press. pp. 73–89. ISBN 0-472-09648-6.
- ——— (1986). "British Interest in the Division of Germany after the Second World War". Journal of Contemporary History. 21 (3): 391–411. doi:10.1177/002200948602100303. JSTOR 260435. S2CID 154146222.
- ——— (1983). "The Great Powers and Post-War Germany". Bulletin of the German Historical Institute. 13. London: 3–12.
