= APS Parnassos Strovolou H.C. =

Cypriot handball club

- Full name: Athletiko Politistico Somateios Parnassos Strovolou
- Short name: Parnassos Strovolou
- Founded: 1957; 69 years ago
- Arena: Kyriacos Pissis Sport Center Nicosia
- Head coach: Christos Chadjisoteriou
- League: Cypriot First Division
- Club colours
Home	Away

APS Parnassos Strovolou (Greek: Αθλητικό Πολιτιστικό Σωματείο Παρνασσός Στροβόλου, romanized: Athlitikó Politistikó Somateío Parnassós Strovólou) is a Cypriot handball club from Strovolos, that plays in the Cypriot First Division.

Location of Parnassos Strovolou

== Crest, colours, supporters ==
=== Kits ===
HOME
2021–22	2022–23

AWAY
2020–21	2021–24

== Team ==
=== Current squad ===
Squad for the 2023–24 season

Parnassos Strovolou

Goalkeepers

- 1 (Cyprus) Georgios Ppoumos
- 3 (Cyprus) Aimilios Iordanous
- 6 (Greece) Konstantinos Gourgoumis
- 16 (Cyprus) Andreas Chalkides

Left Wingers

- 5 (Cyprus) Christos Tartios
- 13 (Cyprus) Symeon Hadjidakis
- 31 (Cyprus) Antonis Petrou

Right Wingers

- 11 (Greece) Vasileios Tornikidis
- 17 (Romania) Georgel Gabriel Haiduc

Line Players

- 9 (Cyprus) Vassilis Demosthenous
- 20 (Cyprus) Georgios Kapetanios
- 28 (Cyprus) Fotis Evdoxiou
- 76 (France) Jean-Pierre Jacques Abily

Left Backs

- 7 (Cyprus) Loukas Paraskeva
- 19 (Greece) Christos Laskos

Central Backs

- 10 (Cyprus) Konstantinos Vlachakis
- 14 (Greece) Dimitrios Stoumpis
- 21 (Cyprus) Andreas Hadjisavva
- 24 (Serbia) Petar Draškić

Right Backs

- 23 (Greece) Nikolaos Karkalatos
- 89 (Romania) Valentin Anton

=== Technical staff ===
- Head coach: (Cyprus) Christos Chadjisoteriou
- Assistant coach: (Cyprus) Charalambos Petrou
- Goalkeeping coach: (Cyprus) Demetris Tartios
- Physiotherapist: (Cyprus) Alexandros Mannaris

=== Transfers ===
Transfers for the 2023–24 season

Joining

- (Greece) Vasileios Tornikidis (RW) from (Greece) Bianco Monte Drama 1986

Leaving

== Titles ==
- Cypriot First Division
  - Winner (2) : 2019, 2020
- Cypriot Cup
  - Winner (2) : 2018, 2019

== EHF ranking ==
As of 23/11/2023

Rank	Team	Points
143	(Hungary) Fejér B.Á.L. Veszprém	32
144	(Luxembourg) Handball Club Berchem	32
145	(Czech Republic) TJ Sokol Nové Veselí	32
146	(Cyprus) Parnassos Strovolou	31
147	(Greece) A.E.S.H. Pylea	31
148	(Bosnia and Herzegovina) RK Vogošća	30
149	(Hungary) Csurgói KK	30

== Former club members ==
=== Notable former players ===
- (Russia) Yegor Yevdokimov (2020-2022)
