= Zhang Bangxin =

Chinese billionaire (born 1981)

- Born: 1981 (age 44–45)
- Education: EMBA, China Europe International Business School
- Occupations: Co-founder and chairman of TAL Education Group

Zhang Bangxin (Chinese: 张邦鑫) or by the western name Tom, is a Chinese self-made billionaire, co-founder and the chairman of the U.S. listed education services firm TAL Education Group.

== Sources ==
- Zhang Bangxin's profile on Forbes' website
- Raging Demand for Tutoring Makes Math Teacher a Billionaire, Bloomberg, 2018
