= Liverpool Media Academy =

LMA

Location
- Metquarter, Liverpool and Here East, Queen Elizabeth Olympic Park, London; Liverpool and London; England; 53.40685°N 2.98577°W

Information
- Type: Further Education and Higher Education private provider
- Motto: Love Media. Love Music. Love Arts.
- Established: 2009
- Founder: Simon Wallace & Richard Wallace
- Specialist: Media, Music and Performing Arts
- Gender: Mixed
- Age: 16 +
- Owner: Galileo Global Education
- Website: https://www.lma.ac.uk

The Liverpool Media Academy, abbreviated and branded as LMA, is a private media, music and performing arts specialist institution in Liverpool, London and Newcastle, England offering courses in Acting, Screen Acting, Digital Film & TV Production, Digital Games Art, Music Performance & Industry, Dance and Musical Theatre.

== History ==
Founded by brothers Richard Wallace and Simon Wallace in 2009. In February 2019 Sir Terry Leahy and Bill Currie (William Currie Group) joined the LMA team as shareholders. Robbie Williams is now also part of the LMA team

LMA have over 900 students media, music and performing arts students.

In 2020 plans were submitted to Liverpool City Council to convert upper floors of the Metquarter centre into teaching rooms, recording studios and common rooms for students of the Academy.

== LMA Choir ==
The choir is a vocal group whose members are drawn from current music and musical theatre students and recent graduates.

There are currently 14 members and the choir is led by LMA Creative Director Steph Wallace Carr. Formed in 2016 as a surprise flash-mob at Liverpool ONE singing Bruno Mars’ Just The Way You Are in answer to a request from Steph's friend Carl Gilbertson, who wanted to declare his love for his wife Laura on their 10th anniversary which then became an internet sensation.

They appeared on the BBC's (now cancelled) show Pitch Battle, where they finished as runners-up in the show's first episode. In 2018 they appeared on The X Factor and finished in 13th place, after being eliminated in week two.

== Campus ==
- Metquarter, Liverpool L1 6DA and Here East, Queen Elizabeth Olympic Park, London E15 2GW

== Courses ==
LMA offers degree courses, accredited by Staffordshire University and Northampton University, in Dance, Acting, Digital Film and TV Production, Music Performance and Industry, Musical Theatre and Digital Games Art. It also offers BTEC qualifications.
