= Internal Market Information System =

The Internal Market Information System (IMI) is an IT-based network that links public bodies in the European Economic Area. It was developed by the European Commission together with the Member States of the European Union to speed up cross-border administrative cooperation. IMI allows public administrations at national, regional and local level to identify their counterparts in other countries and to exchange information with them. Pre-translated questions and answers as well as machine translation make it possible for them to use their own language to communicate.

== Background ==
Internal market legislation of the European Union (EU) makes it mandatory for competent authorities in Member States to assist their counterparts abroad by providing them with information. Some legislation also requires communication between Member States and the European Commission (for example for the notification of national implementing measures of European Union law). IMI has been developed in order to facilitate this day-to-day exchange of information.

IMI was launched in February 2008. Development and maintenance has been funded by the programme Interoperability Solutions for European Public Administrations (ISA) since July 2010. ISA is the successor to the IDABC program, which initially funded IMI and came to an end on 31 December 2009.

IMI is one of the governance tools of the Single Market. Other such tools are Your Europe, Your Europe Advice, Solvit and the Points of Single Contact. IMI applies a "Privacy by Design" approach – integrating privacy and data protection compliance in all stages of the design of IMI – which has been developed in consultation with the European Data Protection Supervisor (EDPS).

== Main actors ==
IMI has been rolled out in a decentralised way. Therefore, the practical implementation of IMI is the responsibility of the individual Member States. There are several actors that play a role in the IMI network.

=== Competent authorities ===
Competent authorities are the end users of IMI. They are public bodies that have been given the responsibility to deal with certain elements of application of internal market legislation. They can function on national, regional or local level.

=== IMI coordinators ===
There is one national IMI coordinator (NIMIC) per Member State, often located in a national ministry. Their task is to ensure the smooth operation of IMI in their country. IMI coordinators may delegate some of their responsibilities to additional coordinators who are in charge of, for example, one legislative area or a geographical region, depending on each Member State’s administrative structures.

=== European commission ===
The European Commission is responsible for maintenance and development of the tool, helpdesk services and training. It also manages and supports the network of IMI coordinators, promotes further expansion of IMI and reports on the functioning of the system.

== Workflows ==
IMI offers a number of workflows to its users in order to facilitate different types of administrative cooperation across the Member states of the European Economic Area.

=== Information requests ===
When a competent authority needs information from a counterpart abroad, it can send a request for information. This exchange mechanism uses lists of pre-translated questions and answers available in all EU languages. It is also possible to attach documents. Only the competent authorities that are directly involved in an information exchange have access to the content. A practical example of an information request is when a German teacher would like to continue his activities in Portugal. The Portuguese authority needs to verify the authenticity of his scanned diploma. It can then use IMI to send an information request to its partner authority in Germany. This authority can accept the request and send an answer back to the authority in Portugal. Due to the pre-translated question and answer sets, both authorities can communicate in their own language.

=== Notifications ===
Notifications are based on one-to-many information exchanges where authorities can alert or notify one or more competent authorities and/or the European Commission. For example, the Services Directive requires that Member States alert each other of possible dangers to the health and safety of people or to the environment caused in the provision of services.

=== Information repositories ===
IMI information repositories are databases storing specific information for certain policy areas. An example of such a repository is the directory of registers maintained by competent authorities throughout the European Economic Area. This directory is equipped with multilingual search functions. The content of a repository can be accessed either by a restricted group of competent authorities or by all IMI users.

== Legal framework ==
IMI is used in all Member States of the European Economic Area for the administrative cooperation required by the Directive on the Recognition of Professional Qualifications (2005/36/EC), by the Directive on services in the internal market (2006/123/EC) and, on a pilot basis, by the Posting of Workers Directive. Since November 2012, it provides a repository for information on licence holders for the cross-border road transport of Euro cash and an IT platform for the problem solving network Solvit. IMI is being expanded to cover further legislative areas. For example, the Directive on Patients' Rights in Cross-border Healthcare.

IMI aims to "become a flexible toolkit at the service of administrative cooperation, contributing to the improved governance of the Internal Market."

The IMI Regulation which came into force in December 2012 is an EU law establishing a comprehensive legal framework for IMI. It provides a complete set of rules for the processing of personal data in IMI and prescribes a method for future expansion of IMI to additional policy areas.
