= CodeMonkey (software) =

Educational computer coding environment

- Original authors: Jonathan Schor, Ido Schor and Yishai Pinchover.
- Developer: CodeMonkey Team
- Written in: Ruby, CoffeeScript, JavaScript
- Operating system: Cross-platform
- Available in: Multilingual
- Type: Integrated development environment
- License: Web
- Website: www.codemonkey.com

CodeMonkey is an educational computer coding environment that allows beginners to learn computer programming concepts and languages. CodeMonkey is intended for students ages 6–14. Students learn text-based coding on languages like Python, Blockly and CoffeeScript, as well as learning the fundamentals of computer science and math. The software was first released in 2014, and was originally developed by Jonathan Schor, Ido Schor and Yishai Pinchover, supported by the Center for Educational Technology in Israel.

== Development history ==
CodeMonkey software program in form of a game for children was developed by three software engineers from Haifa, Israel: the brothers Jonathan and Ido Schor and Yishai Pinchover. The trio set up a start-up company CodeMonkey Studios Ltd., supported by the Center for Educational Technology. The game was launched in May 2014 and is currently available in 23 languages. The company has offices in Israel and USA. Since 2014, CodeMonkey launched several additional programming tools in form of games including Coding Adventure, Game Builder, Dodo Does Math, Banana Tales, CodeMonkey Jr. and Beaver Achiever. In 2018, the software company was acquired by TAL Education Group, a Chinese holding company, but remained active as its independent subsidiary also retaining its software development team. In June 2020, CodeMonkey joined UNESCO distance learning initiative and offered free courses for all schools that were forced to close during the Covid-19 lockdown.

== Overview and functionality ==
The game does not require prior programming experience and is intended for children from the age of 6. It allows the user to make their first steps in programming but also progresses to more advanced topics. The teaching method is experiential, in accordance with the principles of Game-based learning: the children control the figures of animals and direct them to collect bananas, overcoming various obstacles. One of the salient features of the game is that it requires writing actual textual code, as opposed to games that work in a method that represents commands using graphical blocks.

=== Supported language ===
The programming languages are Python and CoffeeScript, chosen mostly due to a friendly syntax. Some games like CodeMonkey Jr. and Beaver Achiever rely on block-based coding using Blockly.

=== Integration of the game in schools ===
The games are intended for individual use and for educational classrooms and have been selectively applied by schools and school centers in several countries including Israel, United States, UK, China, India and Bhutan, among others. CodeMonkey was also integrated in the Israeli Cyber Championship for Elementary Schools (Skillz Olympics) and a high school software program also called Skillz, where CodeMonkey games are a part of coding competition for young students.

== See also ==
- Educational programming language
