= SOLVIT =

SOLVIT is an informal problem-solving network of the European Commission and the member states of the European Union and the EEA. Created in 2002, based on a 2001 Recommendation, it assists citizens and businesses to ascertain their EU rights where a dispute has arisen between a citizen or a company and a public authority of a member state of the European Union and the EEA other than their country of origin, or in their country of origin after exercising their free movement rights elsewhere in the EEA. There is a SOLVIT centre in every member state (as well as in the EEA member states Norway, Iceland, and Liechtenstein).

SOLVIT is available free of charge, and mainly an online service.

Whenever a problem occurs, the SOLVIT centres of the two countries concerned (the complainant's country of origin and the country where the problem occurred) will try to reach a solution within ten weeks.

On 2 May 2017 the European Commission announced a package of measures intended to enhance the functioning of the Single Market within the EU, which included a proposed action plan on reinforcing SOLVIT. The Commission published a report in September 2022 celebrating the twentieth anniversary of the establishment of the network. The report noted that 28,600 cases had been addressed during this 20-year period and 85% of these had been resolved.

The UK's Single Market Centre, which provided SOLVIT services for UK businesses and consumers, closed in January 2021.
