= Istituto Marangoni =

Private fashion school in Milan, Italy

- Type: Private fashion school
- Established: 1935
- Location: Milan, Lombardy, Italy; 45.4672°N 9.194°E
- Website: istitutomarangoni.com

The Istituto Marangoni is a private Italian school of fashion, design, art, luxury management and beauty. It is based in Milan, in Lombardy in northern Italy, and has branches in Florence, London and Paris, Shanghai and Shenzhen in China, Mumbai in India, Miami in the United States, Dubai in the United Arab Emirates, and Riyadh in Saudi Arabia. It is part of Europe's largest higher education provider Galileo Global Education.

== History ==
The school was founded in Milan in 1935 by the tailor Giulio Marangoni, and became a Scuola Professionale Artistica or "professional art school" in 1942. At first the school trained mainly pattern makers and seamstresses; in the 1970s and 1980s it turned towards fashion design, product development and marketing.

A London branch was opened in a former textile factory at 30 Fashion Street, Spitalfields, in 2003, and a Paris branch opened in 2006. In 2010, there were about 2200 students of 70 nationalities in three campuses. A branch in Via de' Tornabuoni in central Florence opened in 2016. In China, branches were opened in Shanghai in 2013, and in Shenzhen in 2016. In India, a Mumbai campus opened in July 2017. In the United States, a school opened in the Miami Design District, Miami, Florida in January 2018. A campus in Dubai was inaugurated in 2022. In 2025, a campus opened in the King Abdullah Financial District in Riyadh, operated in partnership with the Fashion Commission of the Saudi Ministry of Culture.

In 2011, Career Education Corporation sold the Istituto Marangoni to Providence Equity Partners for a price estimated between 17 and 20 million dollars. In March 2020, a consortium of CPP Investments, Montagu, Téthys Invest and Bpifrance entered into exclusive negotiations to acquire a majority stake in Galileo Global Education, the school's parent group, from Providence; the new shareholders took over in July 2020.

From the 2025–26 academic year, which coincided with its 90th anniversary, the Milan school moved to Palazzo Turati in Via Meravigli. The anniversary was marked by a fashion show and an exhibition organised with Vogue Italia.

== Operations ==
The school offers foundation, undergraduate and postgraduate courses, as well as short and professional courses, in fashion, design, art, beauty (including fragrances and cosmetics) and luxury hospitality. In 2025 it launched professional courses on artificial intelligence for people working in the fashion industry. Since 2022 the school has run a joint four-year programme with Zhejiang Sci-Tech University in Hangzhou. In 2025 it signed a collaboration agreement with ESIC University in Madrid.

The design school takes part in Milan Design Week: in 2024 it presented the programme Sublime Living, and in 2026 the installation Domestic Oracles, created with Alessi at Superstudio Più. In 2026 it also exhibited student research projects at the ICFF in New York. In the same year a product design student at the Milan school won the first edition of the Fendi Design Prize, curated by Giulio Cappellini.

In the 2026 edition of the QS World University Rankings by Subject, Istituto Marangoni was ranked 45th in the world for Art & Design; it had entered the top 100 of that table in the 2023 edition.

== Accreditation ==
Since June 2016, Istituto Marangoni has been listed by the Ministero dell'Istruzione, dell'Università e della Ricerca, the Italian ministry of education, among the institutions authorised to award diplomas in music, dance and arts. In 2026, the Ministry of University and Research announced that these academic diplomas would be renamed as degrees (lauree).

In the UK, its BA and MA programmes were validated by the Manchester Metropolitan University, which also awarded master's degrees at the Paris branch. Since September 2023, programmes at the London and Paris schools have been validated by Regent's University London, which is also part of Galileo Global Education. A three-year fashion stylist course in Paris is approved by the Commission nationale de la certification professionnelle. Courses in Dubai are accredited by the UAE Commission for Academic Accreditation, and those in Riyadh by the Technical and Vocational Training Corporation. Istituto Marangoni Miami is accredited by the National Association of Schools of Art and Design.

== Alumni ==
Alumni of the school include Franco Moschino, Domenico Dolce (who left after four months, believing that the school had nothing to teach him), Alessandra Facchinetti, Sandra Mansour, Julie de Libran, Rahul Mishra, and Alessandro Sartori.
