= TAL Education Group =

Education institution of China

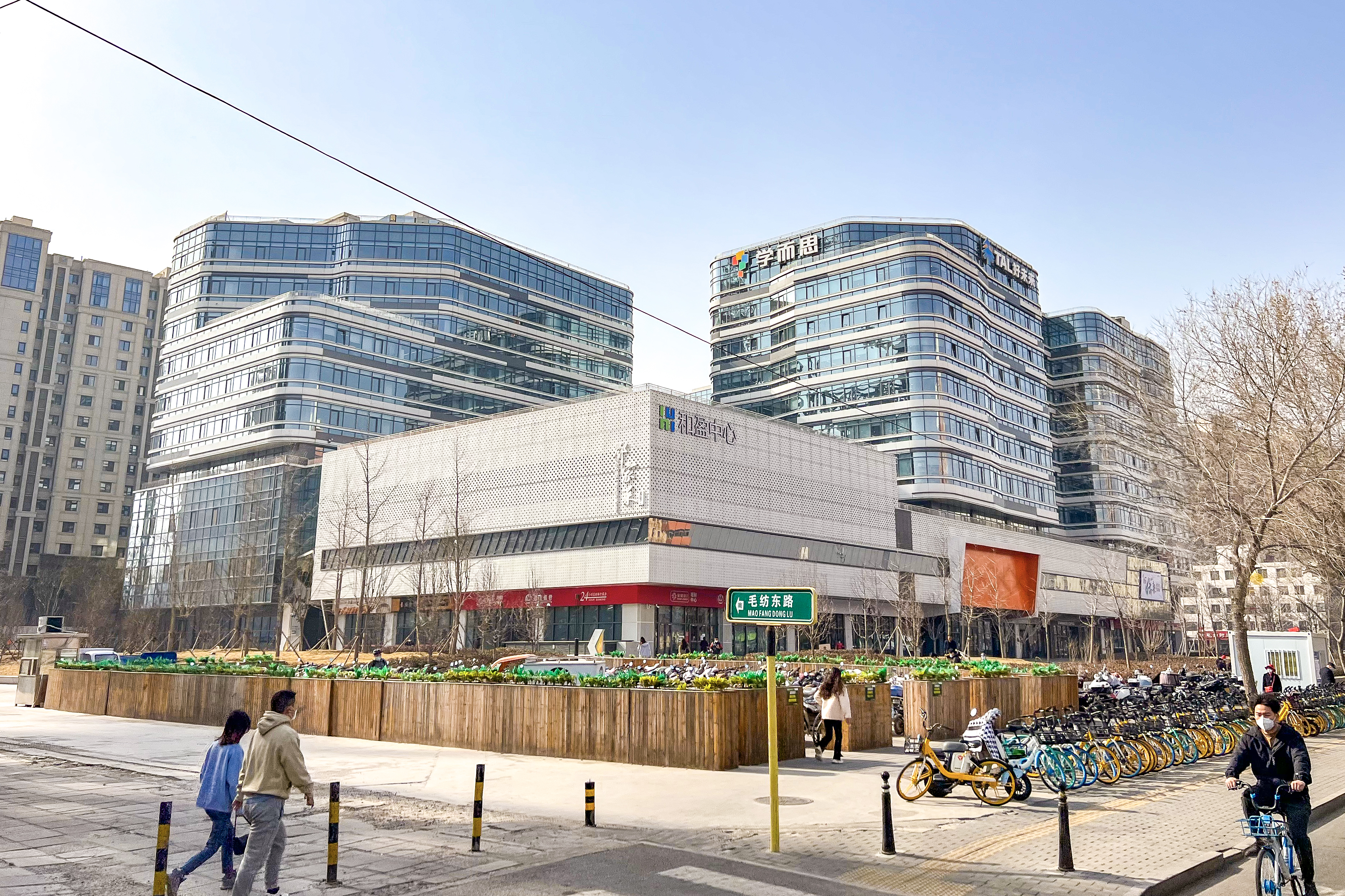
- Headquarters
- Native name: 好未来
- Traded as: NYSE: TAL; China Mainland All
- ISIN: US8740801043
- Industry: Elementary and Secondary Schools
- Founded: August 2003; 23 years ago
- Founders: Zhang Bangxin; Cao Yundong
- Headquarters: Beijing, China
- Areas served: Mainland China; Hong Kong
- Key people: Zhang Bangxin (chairman and CEO); Alex Peng (president and CFO); Liu Yachao (COO)
- Brands: Xueersi, Mobby, Firstleap, Izhikang, Shunshun Liuxue
- Revenue: ▲US$3.009 Billion (Fiscal Year Ended 28 February 2026)
- Operating income: ▼ –US$276.0 Million (Fiscal Year Ended 28 February 2026)
- Net income: ▼US$530.1 Million (Fiscal Year Ended 28 February 2026)
- Total assets: ▲US$5.936 Billion (Fiscal Year Ended 28 February 2026)
- Total equity: ▲US$3.774 Billion (Fiscal Year Ended 28 February 2026)
- Number of employees: 26,100 (Fiscal Year Ended 28 February 2026)
- Website: www.tal.com/en-us/

TAL Education Group (Chinese: 好未来), which stands for "Tomorrow Advancing Life", is a Chinese holding company that offers after-school education and tutoring for students in primary and secondary school. It is headquartered in Beijing, China. The company was founded in August 2003 by Zhang Bangxin and Cao Yundong, as "Xueersi" (Study and think).

The company provides standardized test preparation and consultation services for students studying abroad. It offered help to kids who could not go to school due to the COVID-19 pandemic in subjects including mathematics, Chinese, English, and coding. After new rules were issued by the Chinese government preventing for-profit tutoring companies from earning a profit, the company's stock went down significantly, with a projected 70% decrease in 2022 revenue.

In 2018, it acquired CodeMonkey.

TAL Education Group uses the Think Academy brand for its education business outside mainland China. In April 2024,Caixin Global reported that Think Academy offered mathematics tutoring in Singapore and had operations in the United States, Canada, the United Kingdom and Australia.

Think Academy provides after-school mathematics classes for students from preschool to high school, early-childhood thinking courses and, in some countries, English language arts. Most classes are taught live online in small groups, and the brand also offers one-on-one online tutoring and a small number of in-person campuses.
