= AKAD University =

Coordinates: 48.7926°N 9.1820°E

AKAD University is a private university of applied sciences located in Stuttgart, Germany. Established in 1959, it specializes in distance learning and offers bachelor's, master's, and MBA programs across disciplines such as business, engineering, computer science, and social sciences. As of 2023, the university enrolls approximately 6,380 students.

AKAD University is state-recognized and holds institutional accreditation from the German Council of Science and Humanities. Its programs are accredited by agencies including ACQUIN and ZEvA, and approved by the Central Office for Distance Learning (ZFU).

== History ==
AKAD University was founded in 1959 in Stuttgart, Germany, as part of the Swiss AKAD Group, with the aim of offering distance education. It became one of the earliest institutions in Germany to focus on academic programs delivered via correspondence. In 1980, AKAD received state recognition as a distance-learning university, initially offering degree programs in business administration and engineering-related fields.

In 1999, the German AKAD institutions were acquired by the Cornelsen publishing group. In 2014, AKAD consolidated its various locations under a single institutional structure headquartered in Stuttgart. In 2022, the university became part of Galileo Global Education, a private higher education group operating internationally.

== Locations ==
AKAD University is based in Stuttgart, Baden-Württemberg, where it maintains its central administrative office. As a distance-learning institution, the university does not operate a traditional campus with on-site instruction. Academic programs are delivered primarily through an online learning platform, which provides access to study materials, communication tools, and administrative services.

In addition to its digital infrastructure, the university maintains a network of examination centers in multiple cities across Germany and in Austria. These centers are used for in-person assessments and, in some cases, for optional in-person seminars. The distributed structure supports the university’s distance education model by offering students geographically accessible examination venues.

== Study ==
AKAD University offers accredited academic programs in distance learning format. Its offerings include bachelor's and master's degree programs, Master of Business Administration (MBA) degrees, university certificates, and continuing education courses. Study formats vary by program and include options for full-time, part-time, and dual-study enrollment.

Bachelor's Programs:

The university offers bachelor's degrees in fields such as:

- Business Administration
- Marketing and Sales Management
- Digital Business
- Industrial Engineering
- Computer Science
- Nursing
- Social Work
- Sports Management
- Technical Translation

These programs typically lead to degrees such as Bachelor of Arts (B.A.), Bachelor of Science (B.Sc.), or Bachelor of Engineering (B.Eng.). The standard duration is six semesters, with some programs offering extended duration for part-time study.

Master's and MBA Programs:

At the postgraduate level, AKAD University offers master's degrees in areas including:

- Data Science
- Artificial Intelligence
- Industrial Engineering
- Management
- Human Resource Management
- Global Management and Communication

MBA programs are available in specializations such as General Management, Digital Management and Leadership, and Entrepreneurship and Innovation. Master's degrees typically confer titles like Master of Science (M.Sc.), Master of Arts (M.A.), or Master of Engineering (M.Eng.), while MBA programs lead to a Master of Business Administration (MBA) degree.

== Further education ==
AKAD University provides continuing education programs that are separate from its academic degree offerings. These include certificate courses and standalone modules in subject areas such as business administration, management, languages, information technology, and engineering. The programs are structured for individuals who wish to acquire subject-specific knowledge or update existing qualifications. Most courses are delivered in a distance learning format and can be completed without formal enrollment in a degree program. Completion of certain modules may be eligible for academic credit within related degree programs, subject to recognition procedures.
