= LISAA School of Art & Design =

Art school in Paris, France

- Type: Private
- Established: 1986
- Parent institution: Galileo Global Education
- Affiliations: Cumulus Association
- Director: Agnès Nicolas Ifker
- Academic staff: 200
- Administrative staff: 28
- Students: 2000
- Campus: Paris, Rennes, Nantes, Strasbourg, Bordeaux & Toulouse
- Website: www.lisaa.com/en

LISAA School of Art & Design, (L'Institut Supérieur des Arts Appliqués) is a French private college for applied arts education founded in 1986. LISAA has locations in Paris, Rennes, Nantes, Strasbourg, Bordeaux and Toulouse. The school is one of about 100 recognized by the French Ministry of Culture and Communication. Diplomas are offered in graphic design, animation & video games, interior architecture & design, and fashion.

== History ==
In 1986, Michel Glize, architect and entrepreneur founded LISAA.

In 2012, the school is sold to Galileo Global Education.

== Teaching ==
The main concentrations in the academic curriculum are graphic design, animation & video games, interior architecture & design, and fashion. Many programs last five years (bac+5), while some are shorter (bachelors, BTS, MANAA).

=== Foundation year ===
Two one-year foundation courses are offered at LISAA:

- Introductory course in applied arts
- Foundation year in Architecture (preparatory class for schools of architecture)

=== Fashion courses ===
Master and bachelor diplomas exist for the fashion industry:

- Master of Interior Decoration
- Master of Journalist, blogger, influencer fashion/beauty & luxury
- Master of Fashion Design & Business
- Two or three year course of Artistic make-up artist
- Bachelor (BTS) of Fashion Design / Pattern Making
- Bachelor (BTS) of Fashion Design / Textiles, materials, surfaces
- Bachelor (BTS) of Fashion Design / Textile Design
- Master of Fashion & Luxury Management

=== Interior architecture and design courses ===
Master, bachelor diplomas are offered in the interior architecture and design field:

- Master of Interior Decoration
- Postgraduate program of Interior Architecture & Design (5 years)
- Foundation year in Architecture (preparatory class for schools of architecture in one year)
- Bachelor (BTS) of Interior Architecture
- Master of Interior Architecture & Connected Design
- Master of Interior Architecture & Service Design
- Master of Interior Architecture & Global Design

=== Animation and video games ===
Bachelor, master diplomas are offered in the animation and video game field:

- MBA Video Game Production (1 year)
- Master Supervisor & Director Animation & Special Effects (2-year programme)
- Master of Video Game Creative Director
- Bachelor of 2-D/3-D Animation
- Bachelor of 2-D Animation
- Bachelor of 3-D Animation
- Bachelor of 2-D/3-D Video Games
- Bachelor of Visual Effects

=== Graphic and motion design ===
Bachelor, master diplomas are offered in the graphic and motion design field:

- Bachelor (BTS) of Graphic Design / Print
- Bachelor (BTS) of Graphic Design / Digital Media
- Bachelor (BTS) of Graphic Design
- Bachelor Motion Design
- Bachelor Graphic Design
- Master Digital Art Direction / Animated media
- Master Digital Art Direction / UX Design
- Master Digital Art Direction
- Master Art Direction for Creative & Cultural Industries

== Partnerships ==
=== Academic partnerships ===
LISAA has academic partnerships with schools in Europe or on the American continent:

- Helmo (Liège / Belgium)
- Vilnius College of Design (Vilnius / Lithuania)
- Thomas More Mechelen (Malines / Belgium)
- IED (Milan / Italy)
- IED (Madrid / Spain)
- IADE Instituto Superior de Design (Lisbon / Portugal)
- VIA (The Netherlands)
- KISD (Cologne / Germany)
- Hochschule (Trier / Germany)
- Manchester Metropolitan University (United Kingdom)
- Abadir Academy (Italy)
- University of Applied Sciences MACROMEDIA
- Leeds College of Arts (United Kingdom)
- ARTCOM (Morocco)
- Nazareth College, Rochester, New York (USA)
- Universidad IEU - (Mexico)

== Rankings ==
The French student magazine "l'Étudiant" and "Le Figaro Etudiant" regularly rank LISAA in the top schools in France in various fields of applied arts.

French rankings
	2016	2017	2018
Le Figaro Étudiant (best video game schools)		6th	
Le Figaro Étudiant (best animation schools)		9th	
L'Étudiant (favourite video game schools according to professionals)	5th		
L'Étudiant (favourite graphic design schools according to professionals)			10th
L'Étudiant (favourite fashion design schools according to professionals)	8th	8th	
L'Étudiant (favourite product design schools according to professionals)			10th
L'Étudiant (favourite interior architecture schools according to professionals)			9th

International rankings
	2015	2016	2017
GC Student Award (Top 20 Schools to Study VFX/Animation and Next-Gen Gaming)	20th		
World news (Top Fashion Schools In Paris, France)		5th	

== International ==
LISAA School of Art & Design is a member of the international association CUMULUS. For the design course student exchanges are made with other schools of the international association of art & design universities CUMULUS. Ten percent of the cohort is of foreign origin.

== Ownership ==
The school was bought by the investment fund Galileo Global Education in 2012.
