= Yegor Yevdokimov =

Russian handball player

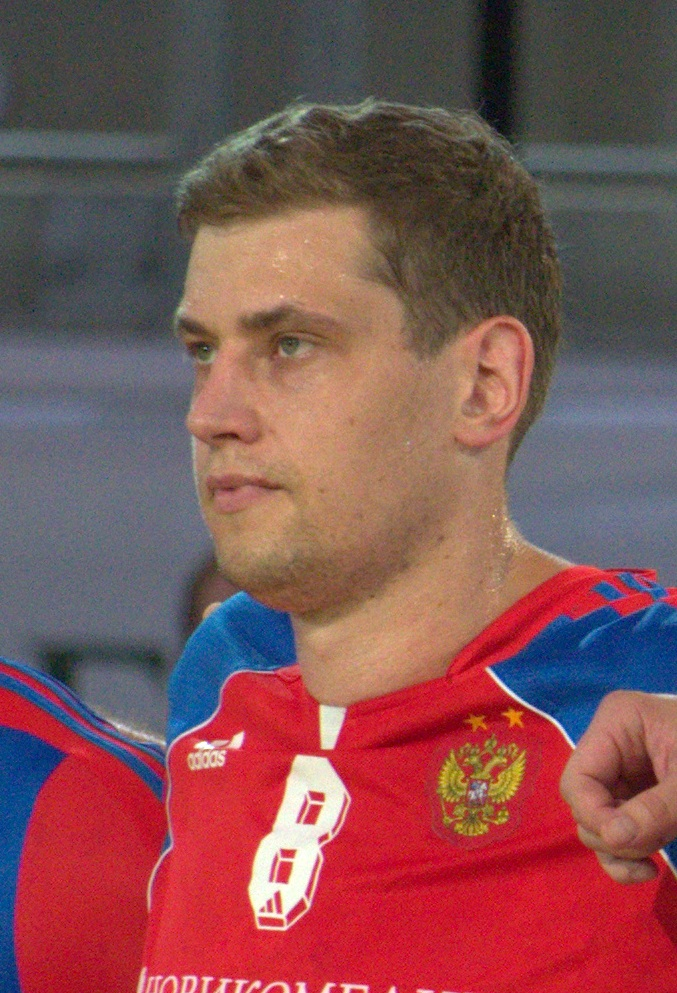

Personal information
- Nationality: Russian
- Born: 9 March 1982 (age 44) Chelyabinsk, Russia
- Height: 2.03 m (6 ft 8 in)

Sport
- Sport: Handball
- Position: Pivot
- Current club: HC Spartak
- Number: 8
National team
Years	Team	Apps	(Gls)
–	Russia	137	(181)

Yegor Viktorovich Yevdokimov (Russian: Егор Викторович Евдокимов; born 9 March 1982) is a Russian handball player for HC Spartak and the Russian national team.
