= SPE Strovolos Nicosia =

Cypriot handball club

- Full name: A.S.S Spes
- Founded: 1986; 39 years ago
- League: Cyprus Handball League
- 2015-16: 1st

SPE Strovolos Nicosia, also known as A.S.S. Spes is a Cypriot handball team located in Nicosia. They compete in the Cyprus National Handball League.

== Titles ==
- Cyprus National Handball League
  - Winner (19): 1990, 1991, 1992, 1993, 1994, 1997, 1998, 1999, 2000, 2002, 2003, 2004, 2005, 2006, 2007, 2009, 2010, 2011, 2012, 2014
- Cyprus Cup
  - Winner (18): 1991, 1992, 1993, 1994, 1997, 1998, 1999, 2000, 2002, 2003, 2004, 2005, 2006, 2008, 2009, 2010, 2011, 2012

== European record ==
Season	Competition	Round	Club	1st leg	2nd leg	Aggregate
2016-17	Challenge Cup	R3	(Montenegro) RK Partizan 1949	21–27	22–22	43–49

== Team ==
=== Current squad ===
Squad for the 2016–17 season

Goalkeepers

- (Cyprus) Giannis Agroyiannis
- (Cyprus) Michalis Kaili
- (Cyprus) Panayiotis Roussos

Wingers
RW

- (Cyprus) Andreas Georgiou
- (Cyprus) Nearchos Michaelides
- (Cyprus) Nektarios Stylianou

LW

- (Cyprus) Georgios Christodoulou
- (Cyprus) Andreas Fotiou
- (Cyprus) Nikolas Georgiou

Line players

- (Cyprus) Christos Chrysanthou

Back players
LB

- (Cyprus) Andreas Ioannou
- (Cyprus) Savvas Kasapis

CB

- (Cyprus) George Giorgallis
- (Cyprus) Christoforos Tartios
- (Cyprus) Marios Tseriotis
- (Cyprus) Savvas Zografos

RB

- (Cyprus) Georgios Loizou
- (Cyprus) Soteris Prountzos
- (Cyprus) Onoufrios Tzouvas
