= European University Cyprus =

Private university in Nicosia, Cyprus

Coordinates: 35°09′34″N 33°20′20″E

- Greek: Ευρωπαϊκό Πανεπιστήμιο Κύπρου
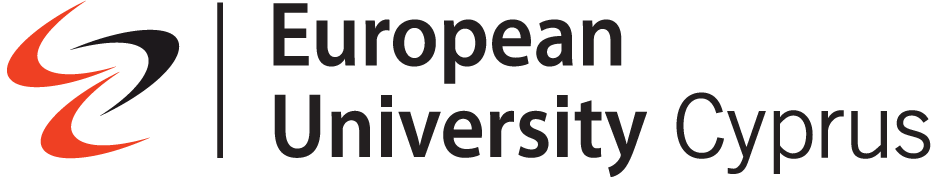
- Type: Private university
- Established: 1961
- Parent institution: Galileo Global Education
- President: Dr. Christoforos Hadjikyprianou
- Rector: Dr. Andreas Efstathiou
- Total staff: 1,500
- Students: 12,250+
- Location: Engomi, Nicosia District, Cyprus, EU
- Campus: Nicosia
- Website: https://www.euc.ac.cy

University rankings

Global – Overall
- THE World: 801-1000 (2025)

Regional – Overall
- QS Emerging Europe and Central Asia: 211-220 (2022)

The European University Cyprus (EUC) (Greek: Ευρωπαϊκό Πανεπιστήμιο Κύπρου) is a private non-profit university in Nicosia, Cyprus and Frankfurt, Germany, which evolved out of Cyprus College, one of the oldest institutions of higher education in Cyprus. Admission to European University Cyprus is based on applicants' academic records and performance. The institution has a current enrollment of over 12,250 students with international students representing about 70% of the student body. It provides internationally recognized undergraduate, graduate, and doctorate degrees. The programs of study are graded based on the European Credit Transfer and Accumulation System (ECTS). All bachelor's, master's and Ph.D. programs have been approved by The Cyprus Agency of Quality Assurance and Accreditation in Higher Education (CYQAA) and are recognized worldwide. European University Cyprus cooperates with several universities all over the world. It participates in Erasmus+ program and enables students, academics and staff to travel and study at several universities in Europe and beyond.

== History ==
Ioannis Gregoriou in 1961 founded the first Business College in Cyprus under the brand name "Cyprus College". The college later developed into the current European University Cyprus in 2007, following a change in the law to allow the operation of private universities in Cyprus.

President Bill Clinton, visited EUC in 2012. The president advised on Social Responsibility, youth leadership and increasing access to higher education.

In 2018, European University Cyprus was acquired by Galileo Global Education, Europe’s largest higher education group with a network of 65 institutions present in 20 countries and 300,000 enrolled students.

In 2022, the university expanded to Germany by opening a branch of its School of Medicine in Frankfurt. The branch began operations in October 2022 with an English-taught Doctor of Medicine (MD) program.

In 2026, the university announced a planned expansion of the Frankfurt campus's academic curriculum.

By 2028, the university is scheduled to complete a €22 million infrastructure project at the Frankfurt campus, adding approximately 10,000 square meters of academic and research space.

== Schools and departments ==
EUC is composed of seven schools:

=== School of Humanities, Social and Education Sciences ===
- Department of Arts
- Department of Education Sciences
- Department of Humanities
- Department of Social and Behavioral Sciences

=== School of Sciences ===
- Department of Computer Science and Engineering
- Department of Health Sciences
- Department of Life Sciences

=== School of Business Administration ===
- Department of Accounting, Economics and Finance
- Department of Management and Marketing

=== School of Law ===
Offering undergraduate, postgraduate and doctoral programs.

=== School of Medicine ===
- Department of Medicine, Nicosia
- Department of Medicine, Frankfurt Branch

Students are taught and trained in Cyprus. No ‘premedical’ coursework is required as the program of study provides an all-inclusive, full basic sciences thematic unit. The European University Cyprus School of Medicine is accredited by the Cyprus Agency of Quality Assurance and Accreditation in Higher Education (DI.PA.E) and the World Federation for Medical Education (WFME) , approved by Hellenic National Academic Recognition Information Centre and listed in the International Medical Education Directory of the Foundation for Advancement of International Medical Education and Research.

Nobel Laureates, Biochemist Tomas Lindahl (Chemistry 2015), Biologist Martin Evans (Medicine 2007), Biologist Aaron Ciechanover (Chemistry 2004) and Biochemist Robert Huber (Chemistry 1988) are among the Professors of the School of Medicine. Nobel Laureate (Chemistry 2009), Biochemist Ada Yonath, Biochemist Jean-Marie Lehn (Chemistry 1987), Molecular Biologist Gregory Winter (Chemistry 2018), and Virologist Harvey J. Alter (Physiology or Medicine 2020) are Honorary Professors of the School.

In 2017, the School offered the first Dental degree Program in Cyprus. The School of Medicine is recognised by the European Parliament and Council on the IMI (Internal Market Information System) platform. The School of Medicine meets the eligibility criteria of the Educational Commission for Foreign Medical Graduates (ECFMG). As a result, its graduates are eligible to apply for ECFMG certification, a prerequisite for taking the United States Medical Licensing Examination (USMLE) and for pursuing postgraduate training or medical licensure in the United States. It counts students from various countries such as Austria, France, Germany, Greece, Belgium, Israel, Italy, Sweden, Russia, the UAE, the UK and the US as well as many students from Cyprus.

Clinical rotations

Medical students at EUC participate in clinical rotations across both public and private healthcare institutions. In Cyprus, affiliated hospitals include the German Medical Institute, the Mediterranean Hospital, and the American Medical Center. In Greece, clinical placements are conducted at IASO General Hospital, the European Interbalkan Medical Center in Thessaloniki, and Athens Medical Center. In the United States, training takes place at Bergen New Bridge Medical Center and Larkin Community Hospital. In Germany, affiliated institutions include St. Elisabethen Hospital and the Frankfurt Maingau Clinic of the Red Cross.

Medicine Frankfurt Branch Beginning operation in September 2022, the European University Cyprus School of Medicine’s Frankfurt Branch offers the MD Degree in Germany. The Medical Doctor program is conducted in English, and carries a minimum workload of 5500 hours of theoretical and practical training, equivalent to 360 ECTS, and it can be completed over six years.

=== School of Dentistry ===
The School of Dentistry offers a five-year Dental Surgery DBS Degree, conducted in English.

Dental Clinic on Campus The dental clinic operates on EUC campus and is used for the training of dental students.

=== School of Veterinary Medicine ===
The School of Veterinary Medicine offers a five-year Doctor of Veterinary Medicine (DVM) degree following the European System of Evaluation of Veterinary Training (ESEVT) requirements. The programme includes early exposure to animal care, husbandry and clinical practice and access to the EUC Small Animal Veterinary Teaching Hospital.

=== Distance Education Unit ===
In collaboration with the university's schools, the Distance Education Unit offers bachelor's and master's degrees, in various disciplines, such as education, music education, psychology, public health, public administration, counselling, business administration, marketing communication and social media, information systems, English language and literature, cybersecurity, artificial intelligence and speech pathology. These programs are offered in Greek and/or English.

== Rankings and recognition ==
In the QS Stars University Ratings 2024, European University Cyprus (EUC) received an overall rating of Five Stars following an independent evaluation. The university achieved the Five Star designation in the categories of Teaching, Employability, Global Engagement, Online Learning, Diversity, Equality and Inclusion, as well as for its Doctor of Medicine (MD) program.

In the Times Higher Education (THE) World University Rankings 2026, the university was ranked in the 801-1,000 band. Furthermore, the THE World University Rankings by Subject 2025 ranked the university within the 501-600 band globally for the disciplines of Medicine, Dentistry, and Health Sciences.

European University Cyprus is a full member of the Utrecht Network, an association of over 30 European universities across 26 countries. The network facilitates academic cooperation, research collaboration, and the mobility of students and staff among member institutions.

In 2017 the university was awarded the “HR Excellence in Research” logo by the European Commission, in recognition of its human-resources policies for researchers and its commitment to the principles of the European Charter for Researchers and the Code of Conduct for the Recruitment of Researchers. The university subsequently renewed this commitment with an updated action plan in 2022.

The School of Medicine received the first award for Best Medical Facilities and for Best Medical Solutions at the Crestron International Awards .

== Academic Accreditation ==
=== Pharmacy ===
The Pharmacy program is included in the World List of Pharmacy Schools and constitutes a member of the International Pharmaceutical Federation (FIP). It is accredited under the Internal Market Information System (IMI) in compliance with Directive 2005/36/EC. This accreditation allows graduates to practice as pharmacists in any European Union member state, provided they meet national licensure requirements.

=== Nursing ===
The Bachelor of Science in Nursing is recognized by the European Commission as an approved program under Directive 2005/36/EC. Graduates are eligible to apply for registration as nurses in all EU member states.

=== Nutrition and Dietetics ===
According to the university, the program aligns with the standards of the European Federation of the Associations of Dietitians (EFAD), the Academy of Nutrition and Dietetics (USA), and the Health and Care Professions Council (HCPC, UK). Graduates are eligible for registration with the Cyprus Food Technologists, Nutritionists and Dieticians Registration Council.

=== Physiotherapy ===
According to the university, the curriculum follows the standards established by the World Physiotherapy Confederation (WPT). Graduates are eligible to apply for registration with the Cyprus Physiotherapists Registration Council.

=== Accounting and Finance ===
The Accounting program is recognized and holds exemptions from the Association of Chartered Certified Accountants (ACCA) and the Institute of Chartered Accountants in England and Wales (ICAEW).

=== Computer Science ===
Based on information from the university, the Bachelor of Science in Computer Science is recognized by the Cyprus Scientific and Technical Chamber (ETEK). The program maintains affiliations with the Institute of Electrical and Electronics Engineers (IEEE) and the Association for Computing Machinery (ACM).

== Research and innovation ==
European University Cyprus conducts research on various disciplines, with publication output concentrated in medicine, the social sciences, biochemistry, genetics, molecular biology, and computer science. By 2026, the university was involved in over 70 active research projects, with total external funding exceeding €10 million.

Between 2020 and 2025, the university’s external research funding and Scopus‑indexed publication output increased approximately threefold. By 2025, its annual output of peer‑reviewed papers indexed in Scopus exceeded 500.

The university had 40 faculty members included in the 2025 Stanford/Elsevier list of the world's top 2% of scientists.

== Student Services ==
=== Accommodation ===
The university offers student accommodation near the campus in the form of studios and one‑bedroom apartments. Its Housing Office provides support to students in securing suitable residence.

=== Student Life and Clubs ===
The university supports a broad range of student activities, clubs, and events, and provides advisory services for international students. It also participates in the Erasmus+ student exchange program.

=== Career Center ===
The university’s Career Center offers students individualized career counseling, support in arranging internships, and annual career fairs with employers. The center also participates in the EURES network, facilitating access to information and opportunities within the European labor market.
