= List of Hult International Business School people =

The list of Hult International Business school people includes notable graduates, professors, and administrators affiliated with the Hult International Business School, located in Cambridge, London, San Francisco, Dubai, New York City, and Shanghai.

== Alumni ==
=== Business ===
Name	Known for	Reference
Nataliye Bitature	British–Ugandan entrepreneur and executive, currently serving as CEO of Energrow	
Gary Smith	CEO of Ciena	
André Bier Gerdau Johannpeter	CEO of Gerdau	
Hixonia Nyasulu	Chairwoman of Sasol	
Oba Otudeko	Founder of Honeywell Group and listed on Forbes Africa's 40 Richest	
Walter Bayly Llona	Peruvian economist and financier, currently serving as the chief executive officer of Credicorp	
Shaun Gregory	CEO of Exterion Media	
Mario Almondo	Former COO of Ferrari	
Nataliey Bitature	2016 World Economic Forum's Top 5 African Innovators & 2014 Forbes 30 Under 30	
Jennifer Arcuri	American technology entrepreneur, subject to national attention in the UK due to her friendship with Boris Johnson	
Martin Fiennes	Venture capitalist and peer	

=== Media ===
Name	Known for	Year	Reference
Serena Dalrymple	Filipina actress	2014	
Karthika Nair		2019	

=== Politics ===
Name	Known for	Reference
Luis Abinader	Economist and politician from the Dominican Republic	
Juan Cohen	Parliamentarian in the Central American Parliament	
Mbaranga Gasarabwe	United Nations Assistant Secretary-General for Safety and Security	
Htin Kyaw	9th President of Myanmar	
Thabo Mbeki	2nd President of South Africa	
Tonika Sealy-Thompson	Ambassador to Brazil from Barbados	
Anil Shastri	Indian parliamentarian; son of former Prime Minister Lal Bahadur Shastri	

=== Sports ===
Name	Known for	Reference
Giorgos Katsaounidus	Professional Greek water polo player playing with Panathinaikos A.O.	

=== Other ===
Name	Known for	Reference
Tom Hayes	Former trader for UBS and Citigroup	
Princess Fadzilah Lubabul Bolkiah	Bruneian princess	

== Faculty ==
=== Current administration ===
Name	Known for / position	Reference
Christopher Ahlberg	Founder & CEO Recorded Future and Chair of the Board of Trustees	
David Collis	Professor at the Harvard Business School and member of the board	
Philip Hult	Chairman of EF Education First and member of the board	
Stephen Hodges	President of Hult International Business School and Chairman of the Hult Prize	
Johan Roos	Chief Academic Officer	

=== Current faculty ===
Name	Known for / position	Campus	Reference
Stephen Bungay	Director of the Ashridge Strategic Management Centre		
Mark Esposito	Professor of Business and Economics. Professor of the Year 2017		
Melanie Eusebe	Adjunct professor (Leadership & Management Skills)		
Olaf Groth	Global Professor of Management, Strategy, Innovation & Economics and the Discipline Lead for Strategy, Innovation & Economics	San Francisco	
Cari Guittard	Adjunct professor (Leadership Immersion, International Negotiations & Strategic Influence, Corporate Diplomacy & Geopolitical Risk and Women's Leadership & Gender Intelligence)		
Alessandro Lanteri	Professor of Entrepreneurship	London	
Andrea Maria Cosentino	Professor of Entrepreneurship & Strategy	London	
Christopher Kummer	Professor of Finance		
Ted Ladd	Dean of Research and Professor of Entrepreneurship		
Emma Mulqueeny	Technologist, CEO and adjunct professor at Ashridge Strategic Management Centre		
Eddie Obeng	Professor at Ashridge Executive Education		
Alan Pilkington	Adjunct professor (Supply Chain Management)		
Omar Romero-Hernandez	Professor of Operations Management and Sustainability		
Rebecca Stephens	Professor at Ashridge Executive Education program		

=== Former faculty ===
Name	Known for / position	Reference
Deming Chen	American businesswoman	
John C. Edmunds	Professor of Finance	
James Lam	Adjunct professor (risk management and advanced derivatives)	
Felix Velarde	Businessman and former adjunct professor	
