= Stephen Hodges (administrator) =

- Education: University of Cambridge; University of Manchester
- Known for: CEO Efekta Education; President of Hult International Business School; Chairman of the Hult Prize

Stephen Hodges is an education entrepreneur who was President of Hult International Business School and also Chairman of the Hult Prize. He was President of Hult International Business School from 2006-2022. Under his leadership Hult grew into a leading global business school known for its innovation. Today, Hult has campuses around the world, over 5,000 degree students, over 6,000 executive students annually and is consistently ranked in the top 50 business schools in the world. In 2018 Hult became the only triple-accredited US business school.

Hodges has also served as a Commissioner with the New England Association of Schools and Colleges.

Dr Hodges is currently CEO of Efekta Education an Education First company. Efekta supplies AI technology to school systems around the world and aims to democratize access to high quality education globally. It was recently named one of Time's Top 100 Most Influential companies in the world.

== Education ==
Hodges was born and educated in Bristol. He received his master's degree from the University of Cambridge and his PhD from the University of Manchester. He completed two years of post-doctoral research in electronic engineering with AT&T Laboratories in Cambridge and is co-author of several patents related to data communication.

== Career ==
From 1998 to 2002, Hodges was an associate principal at McKinsey, and from 2002 to 2005 served as general manager of credit cards at Standard Chartered Bank in Hong Kong.
