= Eddie Obeng =

British educator (born 1959)

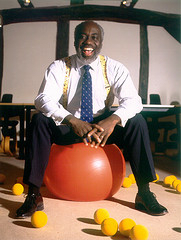
- Born: Edward David Asihene Obeng; 1959 (age 66–67); Ghana
- Education: Cass Business School; University College London; Cranleigh School, Surrey, England
- Occupations: Educator and author
- Employer(s): Henley Business School; Ashridge Business School; Royal Dutch Shell
- Organization: Pentacle (The Virtual Business School)

Edward David Asihene Obeng (born 1959) is a British organisational theorist, educator, and author, who serves as a professor at Henley Business School and Hult International Business School's Ashridge Executive Education. Obeng founded Pentacle (The Virtual Business School) and serves as its executive director. Obeng has been described variously as "a leading revolutionary" and "an agent provocateur" by the Financial Times, and by Abbey National as their "secret weapon".

== Early life and education ==
Obeng was born in Ghana to the scientist Letitia Obeng. When his mother moved to Kenya, Obeng was sent to England, to complete his education, at Cranleigh School. He progressed to University College London and the Cass Business School.

== Career ==
Obeng's business career started as an engineer at Royal Dutch Shell before he became the youngest Executive Director of a European Business School when he moved to Ashridge Business School in 1987.

In 1994, he established Pentacle (The Virtual Business School) to teach this philosophy and ensure that there was a "continuous link between learning and implementation".

=== Educational research ===
Obeng's research interest began in the field of Project Management, where he developed the concept of 'New World Management', also referred to as 'World After Midnight', as a response to the rapidly accelerating pace of change. He is inspired by Eliyahu M. Goldratt. For example, Obeng's "bubble diagrams" are based on Goldratt's current reality tree, Obeng's "sticky steps planning" is an application of Goldratt's critical chain project management.

==== New World Management concept ====
Obeng's concept of the New World proposes that we have moved (as a world) from an age when we could learn faster than our local environment (the 'Old World'), to a new age where the local environment of individuals, organisations, and governments changes faster than we can learn (the 'New World'). He argues that, as a result of this shift, most of the concepts, best practices, and assumptions that we commonly used to plan, manage, lead, organise, and govern are obsolete and damaging to the lives of individuals, society, and organisations. Obeng describes this as smart failure for a fast changing world and is perhaps best summarised by Eric Hoffer's reflection that "In a time of drastic change it is the learners who inherit the future. The learned usually find themselves equipped to live in a world that no longer exists".

==== Virtual education ====
Obeng pioneered the use of bespoke business simulation games to help stimulate and embed learning. In 1995, together with Keith Still, pioneer in crowd dynamics, he created the now obsolete virtual reality game 'Columbus'. Programming required high powered SGI Indigo computers, although the simulation ran at 25 fps on a standard PC running Windows 95. In 2010, he launched 'The Cube' (later rebranded to QUBE). Obeng's innovation with QUBE was to focus on learning and application by integrating all the business models, frameworks, and tools into the virtual reality enabled environment.

==== Teaching approach ====
Obeng is notable for demystifying traditional business school teaching by removing unnecessary theory and focusing on practical tools that can be applied in the real world in "a continuous link between learning and implementation". It uses teaching techniques that ensure that skills are learned and can be applied immediately. The approach has been published in the Gower Handbook of Management.

Obeng's teaching approach is divided into five stages that are based around David A. Kolb's experiential learning styles.

- Engage, to build trust with the client and understand their needs
- Diagnose, to establish the key ‘levers’ the management team need to seize to make an opportunity work and/or to find the root cause/ barriers to turn-around.
- Design, to work out how to re-align the management team's active or perhaps frenetic daily-life to ‘insert’ the learning required to transform it.
- Implement, to deliver the learning and support its application around both hard (process) and soft (people) issues.
- Embed, to remove the barriers to the new learning taking hold.

==== Learning content ====
Obeng's learning material is divided into five subject areas that are intended to reflect the broad challenges experienced by managers and executives in the New World: How do I invent the future? How do I deliver the future? How do I deliver today? How do I lead organised talent? How do I ensure results?

- Inventing the Future; uses proprietary tools such as the SPARQS model and the RABBIT process help to develop new ideas and ensure that they are turned into successful innovation.
- Delivering the Future; makes use of the four project types developed by Pentacle to better manage complex projects. These are "Painting by Numbers, a "Quest", a "Film" and a "Foggy Project" each requiring a different management approach in order to ensure success.
- Delivering Today; uses a number of tools such as the "Money Making Machine" to help to prioritise activity.
- Leading Organised Talent; uses the principles of behavioural leadership to support managers to create and manage effective teams.
- Ensuring Results makes use of assessed learning styles to make sure that implemented actions are sustained.

== Awards and recognitions ==
In 2011, Obeng won the Sir Monty Finniston Award for lifetime achievement by The Association for Project Management for his contributions to the study and practice of Project Management.

== Publications ==
Obeng is author of the following books:

- All Change! The Project Leader's Secret Handbook (1995) Financial Times Pearson Publishing
- Putting Strategy to Work (1996) Financial Times Pearson Publishing
- Making Re-Engineering Happen (with Stuart Crainer), (1994) Financial Times Pearson Publishing
- New Rules for the New World (1997) Wiley Publishing
- Soundbytes (1999) London Business Press
- Never Re-organise Again (2001) London Business Press
- Perfect Projects (2002) London Business Press
- Money Making Machine (2002) London Business Press
- The Complete Leader (with Christophe Gillet) (2008) London Business Press.

He has also made significant contributions to: The Financial Times Handbook of Management and The Gower Handbook of Training and Development and has a regular column in Project Management Today.
