= Stephen Bungay =

British historian (1954–2026)

- Born: 2 September 1954
- Died: 16 May 2026 (aged 71)
- Education: University of Oxford
- Occupation: Director of the Ashridge Strategic Management Centre at Hult International Business School

Stephen Francis Bungay (2 September 1954 – 16 May 2026) was a British management consultant, historian and author, who was the Director of the Ashridge Strategic Management Centre at Hult International Business School.

== Early life and career ==
Stephen Francis Bungay was born on 2 September 1954. He received an MA with First Class Honours from Oxford and studied for a doctorate in philosophy at Oxford and the University of Tübingen in Germany, where he was a Research Fellow of the Humboldt Foundation. He worked in the London and Munich offices of The Boston Consulting Group for seventeen years and worked in insurance before joining the Ashridge Strategic Management Centre. He taught several executive programmes at Ashridge Executive Education program at Hult International Business School, and worked as an independent consultant, teacher, and speaker.

He published his first book on military history, The Most Dangerous Enemy – A History of the Battle of Britain, in 2000. His second history book, Alamein, was published in 2002. Since 2004 he had also been a contributor to television programmes including the Channel 4 series Spitfire Ace.

== Personal life and death ==
Bungay married Atalanta Beaumont in 1987, the daughter of Tim Beaumont, Baron Beaumont of Whitley. They had two sons, born in 1990 and 1994.

Bungay died on 16 May 2026, aged 71.

== Publications ==
- Beauty and Truth: a Study of Hegel's Aesthetics (1984) ISBN 0-19-815540-9
- The Most Dangerous Enemy: a History of the Battle of Britain (2000) ISBN 1-85410-801-8
- Alamein (2002) ISBN 1-85410-842-5
- The Art of Action: How Leaders Close the Gaps Between Plans, Actions and Results (2010) ISBN 978-1-85788-559-0
