= NanoHealth =

Indian chronic disease company

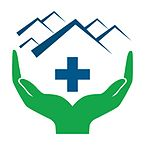
- Type: Social enterprise
- Industry: Healthcare
- Founded: 2014
- Headquarters: Hyderabad, India
- Key people: Manish Ranjan (CEO)
- Website: www.nanohealth.in

NanoHealth is a social enterprise that focuses on managing chronic diseases such as diabetes, asthma, and hypertension in Indian urban slums and low income communities. It was the 2014 recipient of the Hult Prize.

== History ==
NanoHealth was founded in 2014 by a group of five alumni from the Indian School of Business in Hyderabad. Its primary focus is the creation of a network of local community health workers called "Saathis". These workers, who are trained and certified by the company, use the "Doc-in-a-Bag", a low-cost diagnostic tool for chronic disease management. In 2014 the company was awarded the Hult Prize, the first ever Indian team to receive the award. Two years after the founding, Pagitipati family bought over most of the non-active co-founders.

In 2018 they held an ICO to non-credentialed US investors.

== Partners ==
- GVK BIO's HEART (Health Emphasized Analytics and Reporting Tool), a cloud-based healthcare analytics framework
- Youth for Seva, an organization in India providing young volunteers to work in schools, NGOs, government hospitals and other organizations in the social sector
- Tabeeb, a US-based health care firm with an international virtual network of specialist doctors

== Awards ==
- Hult Prize
- GHMC
