= Gary Smith (Ciena CEO) =

British-American executive

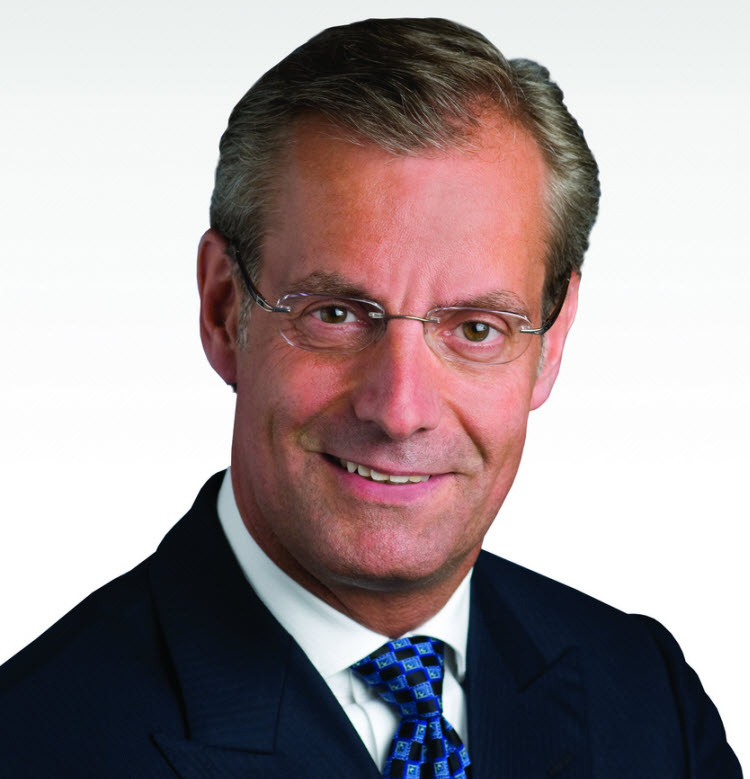
- Born: Birmingham, UK
- Citizenship: British; American
- Education: Ashridge College (part of Hult International Business School)
- Occupation: CEO of Ciena
- Spouse: Stacia Smith (m. 1987)
- Children: 2

Gary B. Smith is a British-American executive, and the chief executive officer of Ciena, an American telecommunications networking multinational.

== Early life and education ==
Smith was born in Birmingham, United Kingdom, and received an MBA from the Ashridge Management College, now part of Hult International Business School.

== Career ==
From 1995-1997, Smith was vice president for sales and marketing at Intelsat, a global provider of fixed satellite services. He also previously was vice president of sales and marketing for Cray Communications, Inc.

=== Ciena ===
Smith joined Ciena in 1997 and has been president and CEO since May 2001. Prior to being CEO, Smith was chief operating officer; and prior to that, senior vice president of worldwide sales. Smith joined Ciena in November 1997 as vice president of international sales. He has been on Ciena's board of directors since October 2000.

During his tenure as CEO, Smith has led the acquisition of seven companies. Most recent is the acquisition of the Optical Networking and Carrier Ethernet assets of bankrupt Nortel's Metro Ethernet Networks (MEN) for $774 million. This acquisition, which closed on March 19, 2010, doubled Ciena's size from around 2,100 to 4,000 employees and significantly increased total revenues. In November 2011, Smith was interviewed by Light Reading about Ciena's acquisition history.

Since the first full year of Smith's tenure as CEO, Ciena's revenues have gone from $361 million in fiscal year ended 2002 to $2.1 billion in fiscal 2013.

== Additional affiliations and memberships ==
In January 2011, the White House named Smith to its National Security Telecommunications Advisory Committee (NSTAC). NSTAC's mission is to provide the president collaborative advice and expertise regarding telecommunications national security and emergency preparedness issues.

Smith is also a commissioner of the Global Information Infrastructure Commission, a confederation of communications technology business executives engaged in telecommunications policy. In addition, he is a Broadband Ambassador to the Internet Innovation Alliance, a coalition of business and nonprofit leaders devoted to making broadband universally accessible.

Smith is a member of the Wall Street Journal CEO Council.

Smith is on the Wake Forest University Advisory Council for Innovation, Creativity and Entrepreneurship.

Smith also is on several other corporate boards. On December 7, 2011, Avaya, a global provider of business communications and collaboration systems and services, appointed Smith to its board of directors. Smith is a director of CommVault Systems, a provider of data and information management software applications and related services with a market capitalization of $2 billion. Smith has been a director of CommVault since May 2004 and lead director since May 2006.

== Awards and recognitions ==
In November 2011, industry publication Light Reading inducted Smith into their Light Reading Hall of Fame, based primarily on his achievements and "staying power" during his 10 years as CEO of Ciena.

== Personal life ==
Smith resides in Maryland with his wife and two sons, and has dual citizenship in the United States and United Kingdom. He is an avid photographer.
