= Ciena Optical Multiservice Edge 6500 =

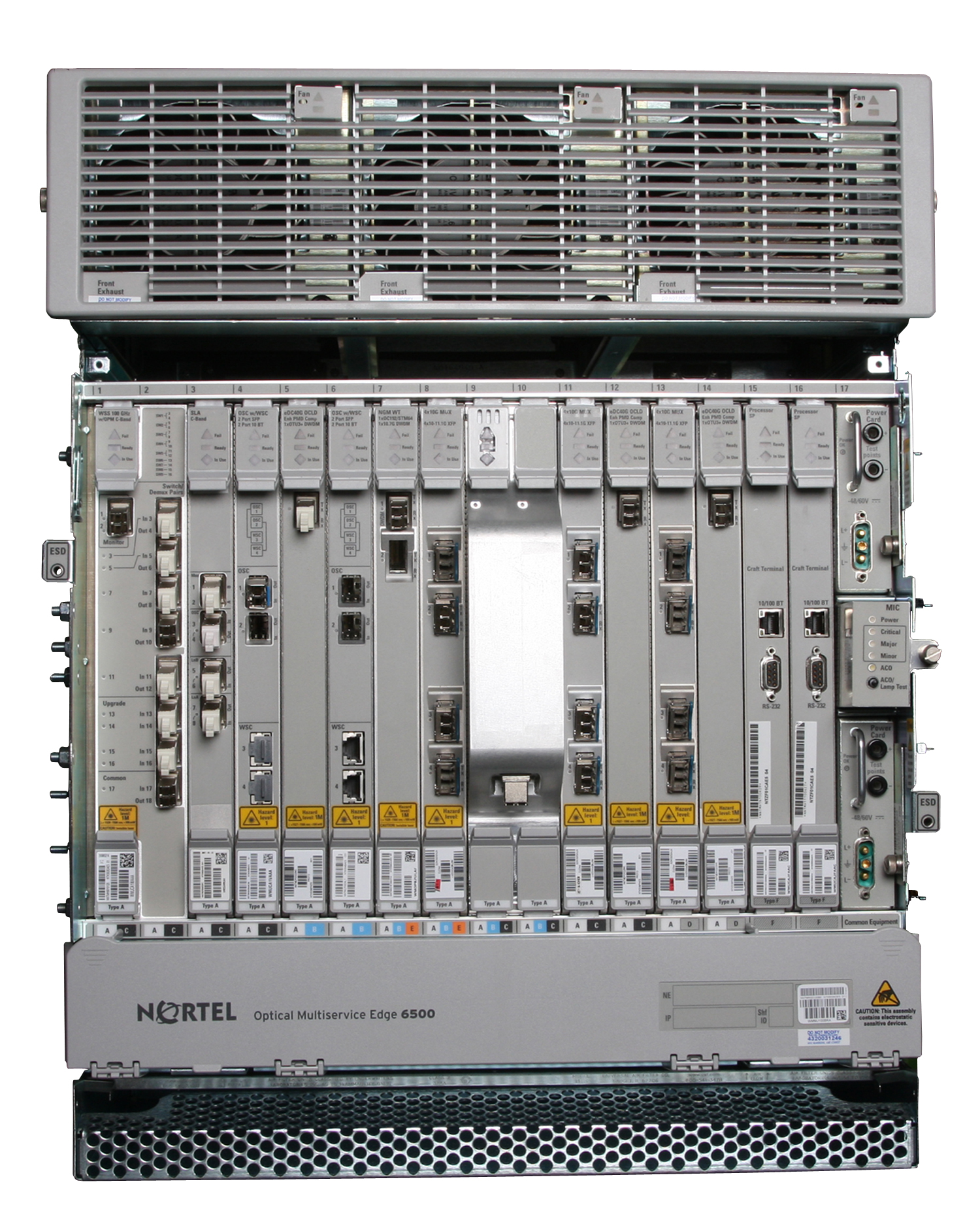
6500 Packet-Optical Platform

The 6500 Packet-Optical Platform (formerly called the Optical Multiservice Edge 6500 or OME 6500 during the product's time at Nortel) is a multi-port multi-protocol system designed by Ciena that supports TDM/WDM/GigE/10G/40G and 100G ports. It is relevant in the fields of telecommunication, computer networking and optical communications.

The system supports high bandwidth demands from applications like IPTV, Internet video, HD programming, and mobile video by increasing the speeds over existing fiber. Typically, increasing the speeds from 10G to 40G to 100G entails trade-offs such as shortening the distance of each network segment or increasing optical dispersion because of the weakening of optical signals as they travel. Prevention of this signal loss would normally require amplifiers or repeaters, or in some cases, installing new and finer-quality fiber. Nortel overcomes this signal loss by using a signal modulation technology called dual-polarization quadrature phase shift keying (DPQPSK).

== Modules ==
=== 100 Gigabit Module ===
- 1 port 100 Gigabit/s Module

The 100G Gigabit Module effectively uses two wavelengths

=== 40 Gigabit Module ===
- 1 port 40 Gigabit/s Module

=== 10 Gigabit Module ===
- 4 port 10 Gigabit/s Module

== See also ==
- 100 Gigabit Ethernet
- Phase-shift keying
