= Rebecca Stephens (climber) =

British journalist and mountaineer

MBE Rebecca Stephens
- Born: 3 October 1961 (age 65); United Kingdom
- Known for: First British woman to summit Mount Everest; First British woman to climb the Seven Summits

Rebecca Stephens MBE (born 3 October 1961) is a British author and journalist, known for being the first British woman to climb the Seven Summits, and the first British woman to reach the summit of Mount Everest.

== Career ==
Stephens originally trained as a journalist and pursued that career for some ten years, becoming deputy editor of the Financial Times magazine Resident Abroad. In 1989 Stephens accompanied an expedition attempting the North East Ridge of Mount Everest. Exploring the question "why do climbers climb?", she climbed to the first camp at 7,100m and made a decision she wanted to climb the mountain herself. In 1993 she returned to Everest on a British expedition and reached the summit on 17 May, becoming the first British woman to do so. On 22 November 1994 she became the third woman, and the first British woman, to climb the seven continental summits of the Messner list.

She was a presenter on BBC television's science series Tomorrow's World from 1994 to 1996.

In addition to her mountaineering exploits, Stephens has sailed the Southern Seas to the South Magnetic Pole and Antarctica and crossed the South Atlantic island of South Georgia. With the polar explorers Ranulph Fiennes and Mike Stroud, she competed in an eight-day Eco-Challenge, which consisted of running, biking and canoeing across the Canadian Rockies.

== Other ==
Stephens is a visiting fellow at Ashridge Business School, fellow of The Royal Geographical Society, member of The Alpine Club and a trustee of the Himalayan Trust UK.

== Awards and recognitions ==
Stephens was appointed an MBE in 1994.

== Selected publications ==
- Rebecca Stephens, Making It Happen: Lessons from the Frontline of Strategy Execution (London: Bloomsbury Business, 2021)
- Rebecca Stephens, Due South (London: Wigwam, 2009)
- Rebecca Stephens & Robert Heller, The Seven Summits of Success (London: Capstone, 2005)
- Rebecca Stephens, Everest (London: Dorling Kindersley, 2001)
- Rebecca Stephens, On Top of the World (London: Macmillan, 1994)
