= EF English Proficiency Index =

Country ranking of English language skills

World map representing different levels of English proficiency in the world in 2025: 600 and above (Very high) 599 – 550 (High) 549 – 500 (Moderate) 499 – 450 (Low) Below 450 (Very low) No data or English is an official or de facto national language

The EF English Proficiency Index (EF EPI) attempts to rank countries and territories by the equity of English language skills amongst those adults who took the EF test. It is the product of EF Education First, an international education company, and draws its conclusions from data collected via English tests available for free over the internet. The index is an online survey first published in 2011 based on test data from 1.7 million test takers. The most recent edition was released in November 2025.

== Methodology ==
The EF EPI 2025 edition was calculated using test data from 2.2 million test takers in 2024. The test takers were self-selected. 123 countries and territories appear in this edition of the index. In order to be included, a country was required to have at least 400 test takers.

== Report ==
The report is composed of a country ranking table, several pages of analysis with graphs correlating other economic and social factors with English proficiency, and analysis of each region or continent. The 2025 report includes English proficiency levels by gender, age group, and region, within countries, and some English proficiency scores by city. The website displays portions of the report and has analysis of English skills in many countries and territories.

=== Primary conclusions ===
- Exports per capita, gross national income per capita and innovation all correlate positively with English proficiency.
- English proficiency levels are evolving at different rates in different countries, including a few countries with declining English skills.
- Europe has the highest proficiency in English, while the Middle East averages the lowest.

== 2025 country rankings ==
Below are the latest country scores, proficiency bands, and rankings as published in 2025. Singapore, which had long ranked highly and was frequently the top performer in Asia in earlier editions, was excluded from the index since 2025 after being re-classified as a native English-speaking country.

Country or region	Score	Proficiency band
Netherlands	624	Very high proficiency
Croatia	617	Very high proficiency
Austria	616	Very high proficiency
Germany	615	Very high proficiency
Norway	613	Very high proficiency
Portugal	612	Very high proficiency
Denmark	611	Very high proficiency
Sweden	609	Very high proficiency
Belgium	608	Very high proficiency
Slovakia	606	Very high proficiency
Romania	605	Very high proficiency
Finland	603	Very high proficiency
South Africa	602	Very high proficiency
Zimbabwe	602	Very high proficiency
Poland	600	Very high proficiency
Latvia	599	High proficiency
North Macedonia	595	High proficiency
Bulgaria	594	High proficiency
Kenya	593	High proficiency
Greece	592	High proficiency
Bosnia and Herzegovina	591	High proficiency
Hungary	590	High proficiency
Czechia	582	High proficiency
Malaysia	581	High proficiency
Serbia	579	High proficiency
Argentina	575	High proficiency
Zambia	573	High proficiency
Philippines	569	High proficiency
Nigeria	569	High proficiency
Switzerland	564	High proficiency
Estonia	561	High proficiency
Honduras	553	High proficiency
Lithuania	543	Moderate proficiency
Uruguay	542	Moderate proficiency
Georgia	541	Moderate proficiency
Ghana	540	Moderate proficiency
Spain	540	Moderate proficiency
France	539	Moderate proficiency
Hong Kong	538	Moderate proficiency
Cyprus	537	Moderate proficiency
Belarus	533	Moderate proficiency
Albania	532	Moderate proficiency
Moldova	531	Moderate proficiency
Paraguay	531	Moderate proficiency
Ukraine	526	Moderate proficiency
Israel	524	Moderate proficiency
El Salvador	523	Moderate proficiency
South Korea	522	Moderate proficiency
Bolivia	521	Moderate proficiency
Russia	521	Moderate proficiency
Venezuela	520	Moderate proficiency
Peru	519	Moderate proficiency
Uganda	518	Moderate proficiency
Chile	517	Moderate proficiency
Costa Rica	516	Moderate proficiency
Armenia	515	Moderate proficiency
Cuba	515	Moderate proficiency
Nepal	514	Moderate proficiency
Italy	513	Moderate proficiency
Nicaragua	512	Moderate proficiency
Guatemala	510	Moderate proficiency
Bangladesh	506	Moderate proficiency
Dominican Republic	503	Moderate proficiency
Vietnam	500	Moderate proficiency
Ethiopia	499	Low proficiency
Tunisia	498	Low proficiency
Pakistan	493	Low proficiency
Iran	492	Low proficiency
Morocco	492	Low proficiency
Panama	491	Low proficiency
Turkey	488	Low proficiency
United Arab Emirates	487	Low proficiency
Sri Lanka	486	Low proficiency
India	484	Low proficiency
Brazil	482	Low proficiency
Colombia	480	Low proficiency
Tanzania	479	Low proficiency
Lebanon	477	Low proficiency
Bhutan	473	Low proficiency
Indonesia	471	Low proficiency
Qatar	469	Low proficiency
Algeria	468	Low proficiency
Ecuador	466	Low proficiency
Malawi	465	Low proficiency
Mozambique	465	Low proficiency
China	464	Low proficiency
Palestine	463	Low proficiency
Laos	461	Low proficiency
Egypt	459	Low proficiency
Madagascar	457	Low proficiency
Syria	456	Low proficiency
Turkmenistan	456	Low proficiency
Kuwait	455	Low proficiency
Azerbaijan	454	Low proficiency
Mongolia	447	Very low proficiency
Afghanistan	446	Very low proficiency
Japan	446	Very low proficiency
Cameroon	445	Very low proficiency
Haiti	444	Very low proficiency
Myanmar	444	Very low proficiency
Kyrgyzstan	443	Very low proficiency
Senegal	442	Very low proficiency
Mexico	440	Very low proficiency
Uzbekistan	439	Very low proficiency
Jordan	426	Very low proficiency
Sudan	421	Very low proficiency
Kazakhstan	417	Very low proficiency
Rwanda	417	Very low proficiency
Angola	413	Very low proficiency
Tajikistan	409	Very low proficiency
Mali	408	Very low proficiency
Oman	407	Very low proficiency
Benin	406	Very low proficiency
Iraq	406	Very low proficiency
Saudi Arabia	404	Very low proficiency
Thailand	402	Very low proficiency
Yemen	402	Very low proficiency
Democratic Republic of the Congo	400	Very low proficiency
Somalia	399	Very low proficiency
Togo	397	Very low proficiency
Libya	395	Very low proficiency
Ivory Coast	393	Very low proficiency
Cambodia	390	Very low proficiency

== 2025 capital city rankings ==
City	2025 score	2025 proficiency band
Copenhagen	644	Very high proficiency
Vienna	634	Very high proficiency
Stockholm	633	Very high proficiency
Amsterdam	630	Very high proficiency
Helsinki	628	Very high proficiency
Berlin	625	Very high proficiency
Athens	616	Very high proficiency
Sofia	616	Very high proficiency
Zagreb	616	Very high proficiency
Oslo	615	Very high proficiency
Budapest	613	Very high proficiency
Lisbon	612	Very high proficiency
Riga	611	Very high proficiency
Harare	610	Very high proficiency
Bucharest	608	Very high proficiency
Cape Town	603	Very high proficiency
Manila	603	Very high proficiency
Bern	601	Very high proficiency
Bratislava	601	Very high proficiency
Skopje	600	Very high proficiency
Nairobi	595	High proficiency
Belgrade	594	High proficiency
Buenos Aires	594	High proficiency
Lusaka	593	High proficiency
Warsaw	591	High proficiency
Brussels	588	High proficiency
Kuala Lumpur	588	High proficiency
Sarajevo	587	High proficiency
Abuja	583	High proficiency
Paris	583	High proficiency
Tallinn	582	High proficiency
Santiago	578	High proficiency
Prague	576	High proficiency
Chișinău	572	High proficiency
Vilnius	569	High proficiency
Tegucigalpa	565	High proficiency
Asunción	563	High proficiency
Madrid	560	High proficiency
Tirana	557	High proficiency
Lima	555	High proficiency
Accra	552	High proficiency
Nicosia	552	High proficiency
Seoul	550	High proficiency
Tbilisi	550	High proficiency
Minsk	549	Moderate proficiency
San José	546	Moderate proficiency
Brasília	544	Moderate proficiency
Montevideo	544	Moderate proficiency
Colombo	543	Moderate proficiency
Kyiv	543	Moderate proficiency
La Paz	543	Moderate proficiency
Rome	538	Moderate proficiency
San Salvador	538	Moderate proficiency
Moscow	537	Moderate proficiency
Dhaka	532	Moderate proficiency
Hanoi	532	Moderate proficiency
Kathmandu	531	Moderate proficiency
Yerevan	530	Moderate proficiency
Caracas	529	Moderate proficiency
Islamabad	529	Moderate proficiency
Havana	529	Moderate proficiency
Tunis	528	Moderate proficiency
Santo Domingo	526	Moderate proficiency
Kampala	525	Moderate proficiency
Beirut	523	Moderate proficiency
Jakarta	523	Moderate proficiency
Managua	523	Moderate proficiency
Addis Ababa	522	Moderate proficiency
Guatemala City	519	Moderate proficiency
Algiers	518	Moderate proficiency
Quito	517	Moderate proficiency
Rabat	517	Moderate proficiency
Beijing	514	Moderate proficiency
Bogotá	513	Moderate proficiency
Ankara	508	Moderate proficiency
Dar es Salaam	508	Moderate proficiency
Jerusalem	498	Low proficiency
Panama City	492	Low proficiency
Vientiane	486	Low proficiency
Bishkek	485	Low proficiency
Tehran	485	Low proficiency
Abu Dhabi	484	Low proficiency
Maputo	482	Low proficiency
Tokyo	480	Low proficiency
Doha	479	Low proficiency
Cairo	478	Low proficiency
Thimphu	477	Low proficiency
Lilongwe	474	Low proficiency
Phnom Penh	472	Low proficiency
Damascus	470	Low proficiency
Tashkent	469	Low proficiency
Bangkok	467	Low proficiency
Baku	464	Low proficiency
Ashgabat	463	Low proficiency
Antananarivo	461	Low proficiency
Astana	460	Low proficiency
Dakar	460	Low proficiency
Kabul	457	Low proficiency
Ulaanbaatar	454	Low proficiency
Yaoundé	450	Low proficiency
Amman	447	Very low proficiency
Port-au-Prince	444	Very low proficiency
Kuwait City	441	Very low proficiency
Muscat	441	Very low proficiency
Dushanbe	440	Very low proficiency
Riyadh	440	Very low proficiency
Naypyidaw	438	Very low proficiency
Khartoum	432	Very low proficiency
Mexico City	428	Very low proficiency
Kigali	426	Very low proficiency
Bamako	425	Very low proficiency
Luanda	421	Very low proficiency
Tripoli	411	Very low proficiency
Sana'a	410	Very low proficiency
Baghdad	407	Very low proficiency
New Delhi	407	Very low proficiency
Kinshasa	404	Very low proficiency
Lomé	402	Very low proficiency
Porto-Novo	400	Very low proficiency
Abidjan	399	Very low proficiency
Mogadishu	391	Very low proficiency

== Regions ==
=== Africa ===
The EF EPI 2025 highlighted substantial differences in English proficiency across African countries. South Africa and Zimbabwe were the continent's leading performers, both ranking 13th globally, with scores of 602. They were followed by Kenya (19th, 593), Zambia (27th, 573), Nigeria (29th, 568) and Ghana (36th, 540). Uganda (53rd, 518), Ethiopia (65th, 499), Tunisia (66th, 498) and Morocco (68th, 492) occupied intermediate positions. At the other end of the ranking, Côte d'Ivoire (122nd, 393), Libya (121st, 395), Togo (120th, 397) and Somalia (119th, 398) recorded the lowest proficiency levels.

== Similar reports ==
The European Commission performed a language survey, SurveyLang, which tested a representative sample of 15-year-old European students on their foreign language skills. The report and data sets were released for 13 European countries in June 2012.

== Criticisms ==
The EF English Proficiency Index has been the subject of criticism in literature. From the point of view of methodology, it suffers from self-selection bias. Instead of testing the level of English proficiency in the population, it tests the level of English of those who self-select. Moreover, the countries at the top of the rankings are often those whose official languages are gradually subject to 'domain loss' in favour of English, because they are being used less and less in scientific research, academic teaching and multinational corporations. The selection bias is noted but not mitigated in EF's analysis.

== See also ==
- English as a second or foreign language
- Test of English as a Foreign Language
