= John C. Edmunds =

American academic

- Education: Harvard University
- Occupation: Director of the Babson College Institute for Latin American Business Studies

John C. Edmunds (born 8 March 1947) is an American economist, professor, and author. He is Professor of Finance at Babson College, where he has been a faculty member since 1988. His work and opinions on the financial expansion leading to the 2008 financial crisis are controversial. He has served on the faculties of Boston University, Tufts University, Hult International Business School, and Harvard University.

== Education ==
Edmunds holds a D.B.A. in International Business from Harvard Business School, an M.B.A. in Finance and Quantitative Methods with honors from Boston University, an M.A. in economics from Northeastern University, and a B.A. in Economics cum laude from Harvard College.

== Career ==
Edmunds has taught at overseas MBA programs, including Instituto de Empresa in Madrid, Spain, INCAE in Central America and La Universidad Católica Madre y Maestra in the Dominican Republic, and two universities in Chile. He has also taught at other schools in the Boston area, including Boston University, the Fletcher School of Law and Diplomacy, Harvard University, Hult International Business School, and Northeastern University.

He has consulted with the Harvard Institute for International Development, the Rockefeller Foundation, Stanford Research Institute, and numerous private companies.

== Publications ==
Dr. Edmunds's areas of interest are international finance, capital markets, and emerging markets. He is the author of over 250 articles and cases published both in academic and practitioner journals. He has published four books. Over a hundred of his articles are about Latin American capital markets and have been published in Spanish, including "Rescate y Recuperacion," America Economia January, 2009; "Financiar a Emprendedores," Estrategia, January 20, 2006; "Cayendo al Segundo Lugar?" El Diario Financiero, July 7, 2005; "Iberoamerica necesita un Davos propio," Expansion, Madrid, Espana, June 20, 2005; "El Auge de la Bolsa en Chile como Impulsor del Crecimiento" (Parte I & II,) in El Diario Financiero, September 2004; and "El Valor Escondido de America Latina," in America Economia, July 2001. https://www.amazon.com/stores/author/B001HMTI1M/about

He is the author of five books to date including books: Desafiando La Pendiente, The Wealthy World, Wealth by Association, Brave New Wealthy World and "Rogue Money". Rogue Money and the Underground Economy: An Encyclopedia of Alternative and Cryptocurrencies by John Edmunds (Editor) which describes the world of cybercurrency, which has experienced explosive growth in recent years, but that expansion has been accompanied by numerous controversies and misunderstandings about what it is, how it works, and how it relates to the underground economy and illegal activities such as money laundering, tax evasion, and human trafficking.

Many illegal or malicious activities are paid for with cyber currencies. This book covers those applications. But cyber currencies also have many legitimate, constructive applications, all of which are explained in Rogue Money in clear, plain English, without embellishment or exaggeration.

This encyclopedia provides a comprehensive overview of alternative cybercurrencies, covering topics such as economic history, international trade, contemporary controversies, and their impact on the underground economy. It explains complex concepts in accessible language, with individual entries examining how each topic functions and relates to the broader field.

== Personal life ==
Edmunds has lived in six countries and spent eighteen years abroad. As a professor and investor, Edmunds has always sought to shatter fatalism in working to ensure that people born into poverty can rise above their station particularly in regions where economic ascension is not easily attained.
