= Mercedes Gallagher =

Peruvian writer (1883–1950)

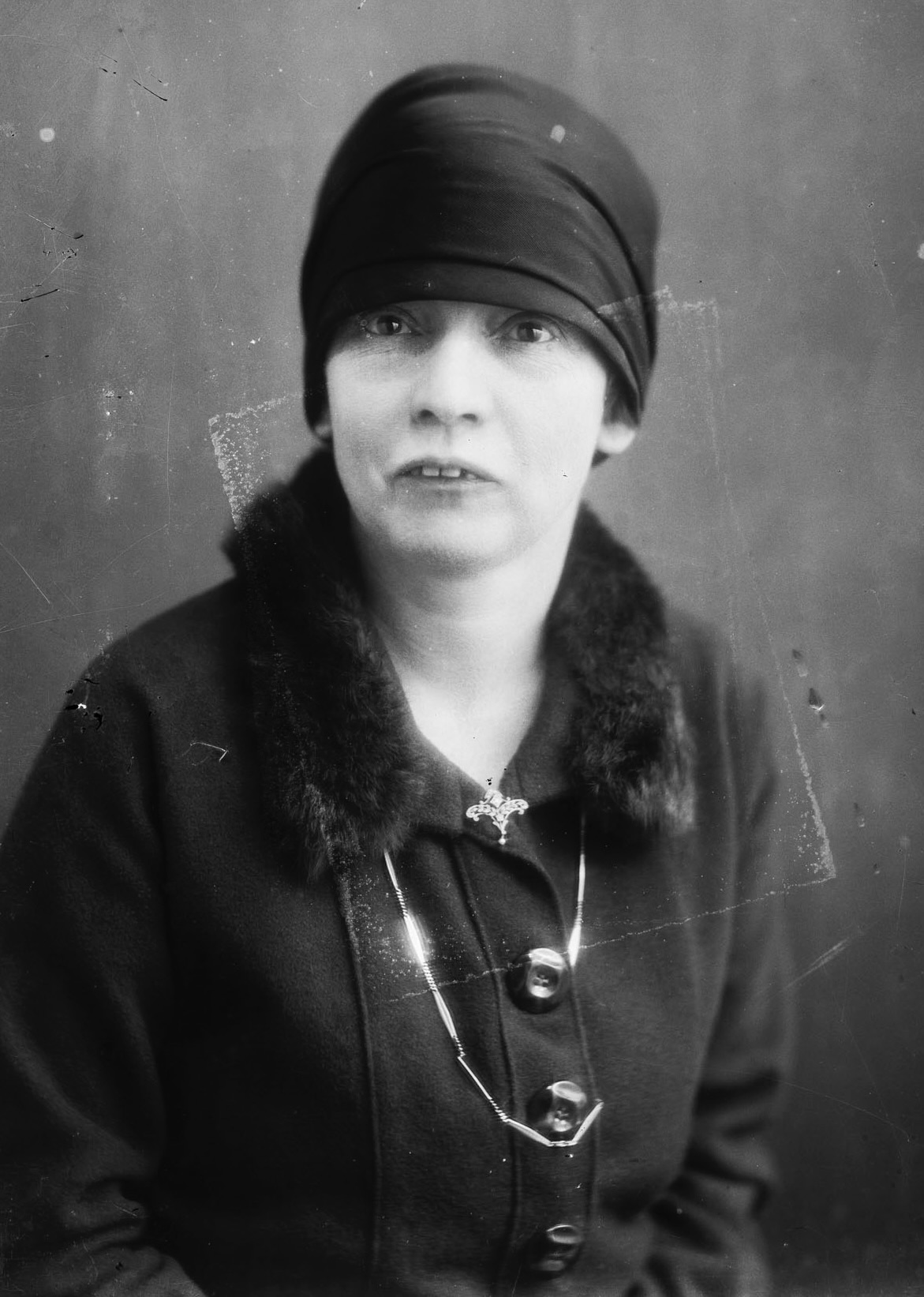

Mercedes Alicia Gallagher Ortiz de Villate (also Mercedes Gallagher de Park, 1883–1950) was a Peruvian writer and academic.

== Biography ==
The daughter of Pedro Daniel Gallagher Robertson-Gibbs and Mercedes Ortíz de Villate y Laurent, she was born in Lima in 1883 and received a private education. Her father was the President of the Chamber of Commerce of Lima, the Club Nacional, the Bank of Peru and London, the Jockey Club of Peru. He was also a member of "The Club of 24 Friends," an organization of influential Peruvian oligarchs.

She married Juan Francisco Bayly Caso (John Francis Bayly Caso) and the couple had two children: Jaime Francisco de Asís Bayly Gallagher (who became the father of the banker Walter Bayly Lllona) and Mariana Teresa Mercedes Bayly Gallagher.

She was widowed in 1911 and then married American Henry James Parks Wilson. The couple had two children together, Hugo Pedro Parks Gallagher, who married the daughter of President Manuel Prado Ugarteche, and Clara Beatriz Parks Gallagher.

== Work ==
She became the vice-president of the Second Pan-American Conference of Women held in Lima in 1924 after the initial 1922 conference in Baltimore. Gallagher was also involved in the Pan American Union in the late 1920s and early 1930s. She was a member of the International Committee on Intellectual Cooperation, part of the League of Nations.

She also served as the president of the National Council of Women of Peru. She was also a member of the Peruvian Philosophical Society, the Biblioteca Entre Nous in Lima, and several European philosophical societies.

She possessed an important collection of colonial Peruvian statues of Piedra de Huamanga, a type of alabaster. Gallagher wrote the first study of these works, which was published in 1942. She also collected Peruvian paintings. She also wrote pieces of art criticism.

She was an important benefactor in the construction of the St. Philip the Apostle Parish church in San Isidro District, Lima, and of a clinic for impoverished mothers. She received the cross Pro Ecclesia et Pontifice from the Catholic Church for her work.

Gallagher died in 1950. There is a street in Lima named "Mercedes Gallagher de Parks" in her honor.

== Works ==
Note: titles given in the language in which they were published, with translation in brackets.

- with Hermann von Keyserling, Problemas de la vida personal, 1934.
- Introduction to Keyserling: An Account of the Man and His Work, London, Toronto: J. Cape [1934].
- Shadows on the Road, London: George Allen & Unwin, Ltd. 1935.
- La realidad y el arte: Estudio de Estética Moderna [Reality and Art: Study of Modern Aesthetics], Lima: Imprenta Torres Aguirre, 1937.
- Escultura populares y costumbristas en piedra de Huamanga [Popular and Traditional Sculpture in Piedra de Huamanga], 1942.
- A bird's eye view of Peruvian painting, Lima: American Women's Club, 1944.
- Mentira azul [Blue Lie], Lima: Tall. Gráf. de la Editorial Lumen, 1948.
