= Giorgos Katsaounis =

Greek water polo player

Personal information
- Born: December 23, 1982 (age 43) Athens, Greece
- Education: Hult International Business School; University of Athens

Sport
- Sport: Water polo

Giorgos Katsaounis (born 23 December 1982) is a professional Greek water polo player with Panathinaikos A.O., playing in the position of central defender (Center Back) during the 2012-13 Championship Period at A1 in Greece. He was a member of the Greece men's national water polo team, as well as the national teams in the Children, Adolescents and Junior Men categories.

== Early life ==
Katsaounis was born in Athens and has a BA Degree from the National and Kapodistrian University of Athens [UOA], Department of Physical Education and Sports Science. He also obtained a BSc Degree from National and Kapodistrian University of Athens in Physical Education and Sports Science with a specialty in Water Polo. Subsequently, he graduated from Hult International Business School's Dubai Campus, with a Master of International Business.

== Career ==
Katsaounis began his career in 1997 with Vouliagmeni Nautical Club and was crowned Champion in the categories of Children, Adolescents and Junior Men. He won the Cup in the National Cup Tournament in 2000. In 2001–02 season, he played in the A1 League with A.O. Paleo Faliro.

In 2002, he returned to Vouliagmeni and played in A1 League until summer 2008. In 2008–09 season he played in the A1 League with Chios Nautical Club. In 2009 he joined Panionios G.S.S. and played in A1 League for the season 2009–10.

In September 2010, he returned with a two-year contract to Vouliagmeni. He has played in 6 final National A1 League, 6 final National Cup Tournaments a European final Len Trophy plus Europa Cup. He has participated in various European and World Tournaments with Greece's National Team.

In 2012, Vouliagmeni N.C. was crowned Champion in A1 National League and won the Cup in National Cup Tournament, getting both top water polo national trophies. In 2012–2013 season he played in the A1 League with Panathinaikos A.O. Sporadically he worked as water polo coach in junior teams and as venue supervisor in nautical clubs. He participated as a volunteer in Athens 2004 Olympic Games in the pools venue.

== Clubs/teams ==
- 1997-2001: Vouliagmeni Nautical Club
- 2001-2002: A.O. Paleo Faliro
- 2002-2008: Vouliagmeni Nautical Club
- 2008-2009: Chios Nautical Club
- 2009-2010: Panionios G.S.S.
- 2010-2011: Vouliagmeni Nautical Club
- 2011-2012: Vouliagmeni Nautical Club
- 2012-2013: Panathinaikos A.O.

== Titles and distinctions ==
- Len Trophy Trophy (finalist): 2004
- Champion in Greek National Children Category: 1997
- Champion in Greek National Adolescents Category: 1998
- Champion in Greek National Junior Men Category: 1998
- 6 times Finalist in A1 National League
- Cup Winner in National Cup Tournament: 1999
- 6 times Finalist in National Cup Tournaments
- Cup Winner in National Cup Tournament: 2012
- Champion in A1 National League: 2012
