= Mbaranga Gasarabwe =

United Nations Assistant Secretary-General for Safety and Security
- Incumbent
- Assumed office 18 April 2011
- Secretary-General: António Guterres; Ban Ki-moon

Personal details
- Born: 1959 (age 66–67) Rwanda
- Education: Hult International Business School; University of Burundi
- Occupation: Assistant U.N. Secretary-General for Safety and Security

Mbaranga Gasarabwe (born 1959) is a Rwandan diplomat who served as Deputy Special Representative for the United Nations Multidimensional Integrated Stabilization Mission in Mali (MINUSMA) and Resident Coordinator in Mali from 2015 until 2021.

Gasarabwe was previously the inaugural Assistant Secretary-General for Safety and Security for the United Nations, serving under United Nations Secretary-General Ban Ki-moon from 2011 until 2015.

== Education ==
Gasarabwe obtained her master's degree in economics from the University of Burundi. She obtained a master's degree in management and business administration from Hult International Business School (at the time known as the Arthur D. Little School of Management) in Boston, Massachusetts, United States.

== Career ==
Gasarabwe joined the UN in 1991 and has held a number of position in the United Nations Development Programme (UNDP) in New York City, including Chief of Division ad interim for Eastern and Central Africa. Prior to her current appointment, she was Resident Coordinator/UNDP Resident Representative and Designated Official in Mali and, since 1998, she had also served as Resident Coordinator in a number of other countries, including Guinea, Djibouti, and Benin.

From 2011 until 2015, Gasarabwe was the inaugural Assistant Secretary-General for Safety and Security for the United Nations. In this position, she was responsible for managing the department and reports to the Under-Secretary-General for Safety and Security Peter Thomas Drennan.
