= Bertil Hult =

Swedish businessman

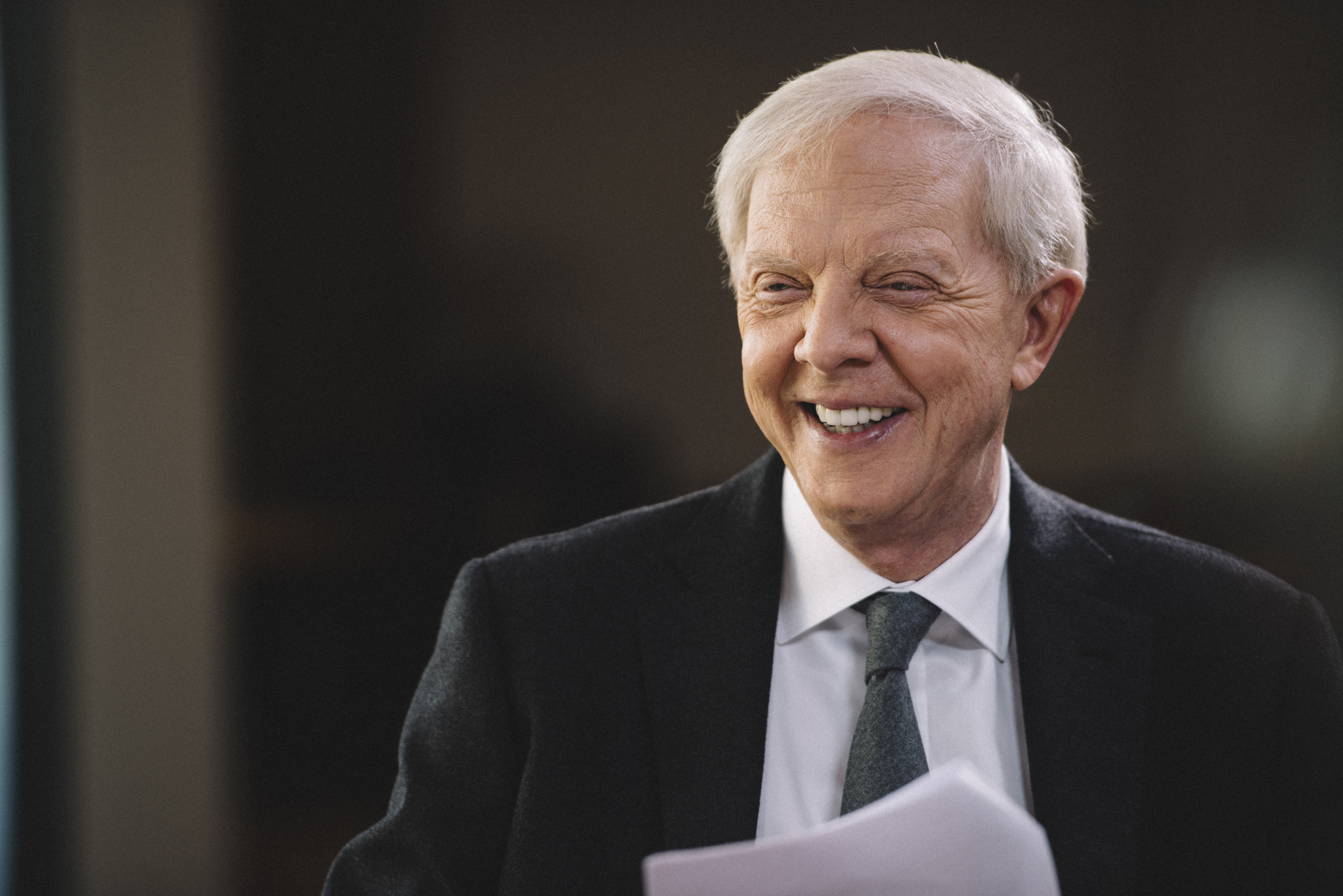
- Born: February 10, 1941 (age 84); Stockholm, Sweden
- Occupation: Businessman
- Spouse: Lisbeth Hult (m. 1974)
- Children: 4

Bertil Eric Hult (born February 10, 1941) is a Swedish billionaire, known for founding educational and language school company EF Education First in 1965, and for being the patron and namesake of Hult International Business School. In 1971, he moved from Sweden to Germany, and in 1977, he established EF's head office in Lucerne, Switzerland, where he now lives. He was the company's CEO until 2002, and chairman until 2008. Today, he is semi-retired. Two of his four sons work in the company; his oldest son, Philip Hult, is company chairman and his third son, Edward Hult, is CEO for North America. Under Bertil Hult's supervision, EF grew to a multi-billion dollar corporation with more than 40,000 employees in 53 countries.

== Early life and education ==
Bertil Hult was born in Stockholm. He has spoken frequently about his struggles with dyslexia as a child. He dropped out of school after junior high and worked making coffee and running errands for a ship broker in London. He learned to speak English during this time and became convinced that immersion is the best way to learn a language. After returning to Sweden and taking up his studies again, he entered Lund University, then dropped out after one year.

== Career ==
Hult founded EF Education First at the age of 23 in the basement of his university dormitory in Lund, Sweden. He started EF as a language study and travel abroad organization, initially for Swedish high school students going to England to learn English. His childhood struggles with dyslexia convinced him that cultural immersion was a superior way to study a language.

He was the company's CEO until 2002, its chairman until 2008, and then semi-retired. Under Hult's supervision, EF grew to become a multi-billion dollar corporation with more than 40,000 employees across 500 schools and educational programs in 53 countries. EF continues to open language schools around the world, grow its online language school (EF Englishtown), place au pairs with American families, coordinate life-changing student travel, and international exchange experiences. EF is affiliated with a business school, Hult International Business School, formerly the Arthur D. Little School of Management, which is named after Bertil Hult.

EF Education First is wholly owned by Hult and his family. Forbes estimated Bertil's net worth to be US$5 billion as of March 2015. He is a keen sailor and his boat, EF Language with skipper Paul Cayard, won the last Whitbread Round the World Race in 1998. He sails on his boat Erica XII. The boat hosted the Swedish Crown Princess Victoria and her husband Prince Daniel on their honeymoon.

In 2006 he was elected International Swede of the Year. In 2012, Bertil Hult was awarded the Lucia Trade Award by the Swedish-American Chamber of Commerce for his contribution to fostering free trade between Sweden and the United States. In 2014, Bertil Hult was named a Laureate by the World Entrepreneurship Forum. The award recognizes "exceptional entrepreneurs for their impact on society and their capacity to change the world."

== Charity work ==
Apart from EF, Hult has been involved in charities fighting drug abuse and promoting dyslexia education. In 1993, he was a founding member of the Geneva-based Mentor Foundation, “an independent, non-governmental, not for profit, apolitical organization” focused on supporting research and initiatives in drug prevention. He has been chairman and is a trustee for the foundation. He also supports the Bertil Hult Prize. Starting in 2003, the Bertil Hult Prize has been given to a Swedish school once every year, based on their support for dyslexia education.

Hult sponsors the Hult Prize, a US$1 million award for a global business school case competition run by the Hult International Business School and supported by the United Nations. Lately, the Hult family has founded EF's Global Classroom Foundation, which has the goal of helping to rebuild elementary schools in troubled areas.

== Personal life ==
Hult has been married to Lisbeth Hult since 1974. Together they have four sons and live in Lucerne, Switzerland. Two of his sons, Philip and Eddie, are currently involved in leading EF Education First.

== See also ==
- List of people and organisations named in the Paradise Papers
- EF Education First
- Hult International Business School
- Hult Prize
