= EF Education First =

International education company

- Logo originally designed by Paul Rand
- Type: Private
- Industry: Education
- Founded: 1965
- Founder: Bertil Hult
- Headquarters: Zurich, Switzerland
- Key people: Philip Hult, Chairman; Eddie Hult, CEO
- Number of employees: 52,000
- Website: www.ef.com

EF Education First (abbreviated as EF) is an international education company that specialises in language training, educational travels, academic degree programmes, and cultural exchanges. It was founded in 1965 by Bertil Hult in the Swedish university town of Lund. The company is privately held by the Hult family.

As of 2017, EF had approximately 52,000 employees in 116 countries.

== History ==
=== 1965–1979 ===
Bertil Hult dropped out of college to launch EF's initial product, English immersion trips to the UK for Swedish students. He had struggled to learn English in school, but while interning for a shipbroker in London he found that he picked English up more easily. He came to think that "learning by doing" could be as effective as traditional methods.

In the 1970s, EF opened language schools in Western Europe and Asia. It opened its first school in Japan in 1972, around the same time that English keyboards were introduced there. It introduced its first cultural exchange programme in 1979, EF High School Exchange Year.

=== 1980–1995 ===
In the 1980s, EF began organising travel and immersion programmes for North America, including EF Explore America, EF Educational Tours, and EF Go Ahead Tours. These did not have a language learning component. The company also launched an au pair programme in 1988, EF Au Pair, which is regulated by the US Department of State. It is now called Cultural Care Au Pair.

In 1988, EF served for the first time as the official language trainer for the Seoul Olympic Games, giving free language training to judges, athletes, volunteers, and host country residents. The company also did this for Beijing 2008, Sochi 2014, Rio 2016, PyeongChang 2018, Tokyo 2020, and Beijing 2022.

In 1993, EF opened its first office in China. The company's network of English language schools in China grew quickly. It marketed its international footprint and hired native English-speaking teachers from abroad to differentiate itself from competitors. It selected cities with a university, a McDonald's, and more than 1 million residents as new locations.

In 1996, the company launched EF Englishtown, now EF English Live, which was among the first online English schools. In 1997, EF sponsored two teams in the Whitbread Round the World Race – a men's team, EF Language, that won the competition, and the race's first fully female-helmed team, EF Education.

In 2002, the Hult family purchased the Arthur D. Little School of Management, which was subsequently renamed Hult International Business School. It is one of the few triple-accredited business schools in the United States.

=== 2006–2015 ===
EF and Hult International Business School started the Hult Prize in 2010, a challenge for young people to solve issues through social entrepreneurship. The Hult family donates US$1 million in annual seed capital to the winning team.

In 2011, EF introduced the EF English Proficiency Index, an annual ranking of countries by their English skills. In 2014, EF launched the EF Standard English Test – a free English test designed for non–native English speakers. In the same year, EF partnered with Community Boating, Inc., the oldest public sailing centre in the United States, to help people with physical and cognitive disabilities learn how to sail.

EF celebrated its 50th anniversary in 2015 with a series of events in Boston including "A Day with World Leaders" with speakers including Bill Clinton, Gordon Brown, Steve Wozniak, and Priyanka Chopra.

=== 2016–present ===
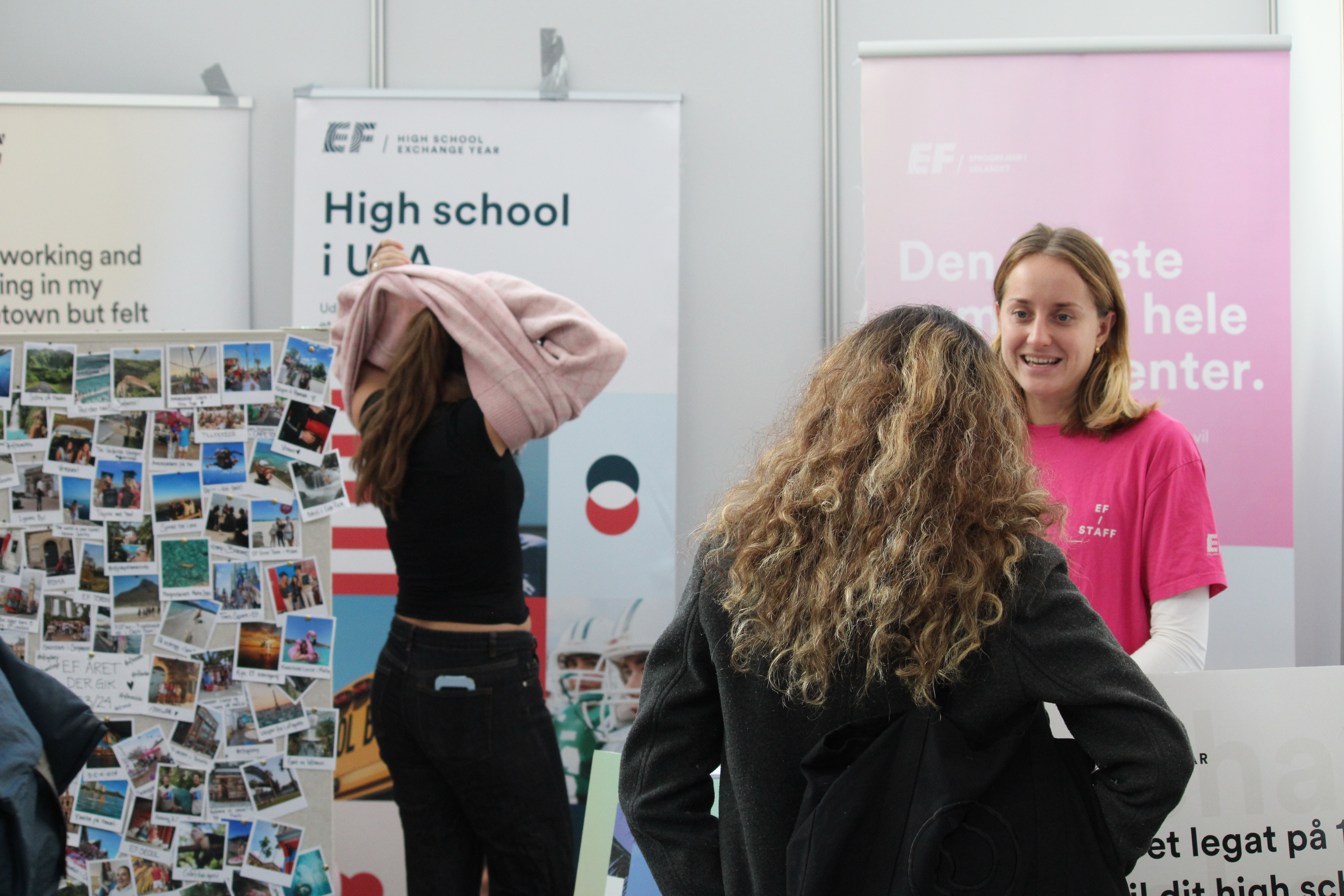
EF's stand at the Danish book fair Bogforum 2025

In 2016, EF became the educational sponsor of the Nobel Prize Museum in Stockholm, Sweden.

In 2017, EF purchased the EF Education–EasyPost professional men's cycling team. In 2023, EF launched a women's professional cycling team, EF Education-Cannondale, which was renamed EF-Oatley-Cannondale in 2024.

In 2020, following the 2015 merger of Hult International Business School with Ashridge Business School, EF began offering executive training for international organisations, in part through Amazon's Career Choice programme. The same year, EF began working with the Mastercard Foundation and the Rwandan Development Board to help Rwandan youth improve their English to access professional opportunities and support the country's hospitality industry. EF sold a majority stake in its Kids & Teens schools in China to private-equity firm Permira the same year. The COVID-19 pandemic presented significant challenges to EF's travel-oriented businesses, but it grew the company's online programmes.

In 2022, the company opened a new campus in Pasadena, California to support enrollment growth in its private boarding school, EF Academy. The following year, EF served as the Official Language Training Services Supplier for the 2023 Rugby World Cup.

In the summer of 2024, EF Education First was declared an "undesirable organization" in Russia. EF Education First was adopted by the São Paulo Department of Education (SEDUC-SP) as a platform of the São Paulo Media Center, called "SPeak".

== Corporate affairs ==
=== Governance ===
Following their father's retirement, two of Bertil Hult's sons took over management of EF – Philip Hult as global chairman and Edward Hult as chief executive officer.

=== Locations ===
EF has offices and schools in more than 100 countries. The company's hubs are in Cambridge, Massachusetts; London, England; and Zurich, Switzerland. In 2014, EF opened a new North American headquarters facility on the Charles River in Cambridge, Massachusetts.

== Controversy ==
EF has been criticised in several instances by students taking its courses.

In 2019, seven of its English teachers in Xuzhou allegedly tested positive for drugs. The case ignited discussions about EF's hiring practices, leading to its suspension from the China Association for Non-Government Education.

In 2020, a former teacher of EF was charged for exploiting a previous pupil in China. The defendant, an American national, threatened to post video footage of the student's sexually explicit conduct online unless she sent him more images and a video of herself engaged in similar acts. EF said the alleged crime happened after the man returned to the US when his contract in China had already been terminated for violating the company's code of conduct; they declined to explain the specifics of the violation. The teacher pled guilty in a Missouri court to sexual exploitation of a minor and to receiving and distributing child pornography.

On 17 February 2022, Claudio Mandia, an Italian student participating in the IB Diploma programme of the EF Academy in New York, took his life following his expulsion after being caught cheating repetitively. The Academy of New York Thornwood responded to the accusations of Claudio's family members by saying that the young man was not confined, that the room was not locked, and that he "could have social interaction".

The Italian television show "Chi l'ha visto?" has many testimonies from students who participated in the EF language study trips. Students have claimed that they were hosted by drunk parents and that one host parent had shot a neighbour.

== See also ==
- EF English Proficiency Index
- EF Standard English Test
- Hult International Business School
- Hult Prize
