= Hixonia Nyasulu =

- Born: 1954 (age 71–72); South Africa
- Education: Hult International Business School
- Occupation: Chairwoman of Sasol

Hixonia Nyasulu (born 1954) is a South African businesswoman and executive, serves as Chairwoman of Sasol, the largest company in South Africa and on the boards of Unilever and JPMorgan Chase, among others. She formerly served as the Director of Anglo American Platinum, the largest platinum producer in the world.

== Early life and education ==
Hixonia Nyasulu was born in 1954 in South Africa. She received a BA in Social Work and an Honors degree in Psychology from the University of Zululand. She graduated from the Hult International Business School (then known as the Arthur D. Little School of Management), in Massachusetts.

== Career ==
Nyasulu worked at Unilever from 1978 to 1984. In 1984, she founded T.H. Nyasulu & Associates, a marketing and research company. In 2004, she founded Ayavuna Women's Investments, a woman-controlled investment firm.

She is a former Deputy Chairman of the South African bank Nedbank. She is a former director of Anglo American Platinum and McCarthy Retail. In 2006, Nyasulu joined Sasol and chaired the board from 2008 - 2013.Sasol. She sits on the Board of Directors of Unilever, Paton Tupper Associates and Tongaat Hulett. She also serves on the Advisory Board of JPMorgan Chase. As of November 2019, Nyasulu will serve as a non-executive director in the board of Anglo American.
