= Walter Bayly Llona =

Peruvian businessperson and economist

- Born: April 9, 1956 (age 70); Lima, Peru
- Education: Hult International Business School; Universidad del Pacifico
- Occupation: CEO of Credicorp

Walter Bayly Llona (born 9 April 1956) is a Peruvian economist and financier, and the Chief Executive Officer of Credicorp. He previously was CEO of Banco de Crédito del Perú, the largest bank in Peru. He is a member of the board of the Institute of International Finance.

== Early life and education ==
Bayly Llona was born in Lima, Peru on 9 April 1956, to James Francis Bayly Gallagher y Lucía Llona Astete. His grandmother was Peruvian writer Mercedes Gallagher Ortiz de Villate and his nephew is Emmy Award-winning television personality and author Jaime Bayly.

He received his bachelor's in business administration from the Universidad del Pacifico and his MBA from Hult International Business School (then known as the Arthur D. Little School of Management).

== Career ==
Bayly started working at Banco de Crédito del Perú in 1993. He became CEO of the bank in 2008.

In 2017, Bayly became a member of the board of directors of the Institute of International Finance.

In 2018, Bayly became CEO of Credicorp.

== Additional affiliations and memberships ==
Bayly also is on the board of Institute of International Finance and Banco de la Microempresa.

== Personal life ==
Bayly Llona is married to Fátima Aramburú Álvarez-Calderón.
