= Tonika Sealy-Thompson =

Barbadian diplomat

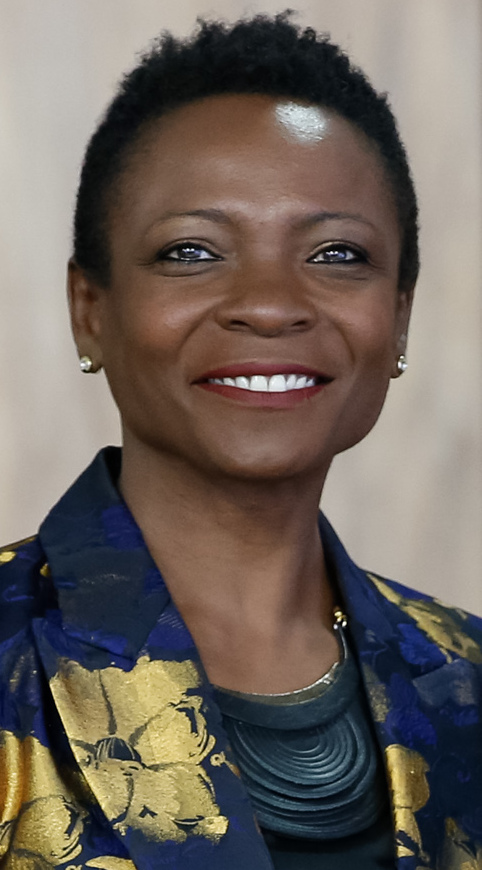
- Ambassador of Barbados to Brazil
- Assumed office 8 March 2019
- Appointed by: Mia Mottley

Personal details
- Born: 1977 (age 48–49)
- Education: University of California, Berkeley
- Occupation: Diplomat

Tonika Sealy-Thompson (born January 30, 1977) is a diplomat, academic, social justice and education activist from Barbados. She was appointed ambassador to Brazil in 2019, and also now serves concurrently as Barbados’ Ambassador to Argentina, Chile, Paraguay and Uruguay.

== Biography ==
Sealy-Thompson graduated from Manchester University in 2001 with a double honors degree in Modern Foreign Languages - French, Spanish and Portuguese. In 2004 she pursued a post graduate certificate program offered by the University of the West Indies Cave Hill Campus in Barbados, and Carleton University in Canada, in International Trade Policy and Diplomacy. In 2011 she was also awarded an MBA (Masters in Business Administration) from Hult International Business School, Shanghai Campus, and the Shanghai Institute of Foreign Trade. In addition to speaking fluent French, Spanish, Portuguese, Sealy-Thompson speaks conversational German and Mandarin. Prior to her appointment she was studying for a PhD in Performance Studies and Global Urban Humanities at University of California, Berkeley. Her research explores the links between the women in politics and performing arts across three locations: Barbados, the Bay Area and Brazil. In order to take up the appointment as Ambassador, Sealy-Thompson put her research on hold and was awarded a Masters in Performance Studiea in 2018. During her time at UC Berkeley she actively participated in multiple forms of anti oppression activism and hosted anti-racism workshops in addition to her research. For this work she won the Michael Mansfield and Randy Sweringen Social Justice Award for ‘Artistic Excellence in Creating a More Equitable and Inclusive World’

Ambassadorial career

At the time of her appointment, Sealy-Thompson was Barbados' youngest woman ambassador at the age of 42. In 2019, she visited Bahia state to explore connections between it and Barbados, particularly in relation to the shared heritage of the Black population in both places. Sealy-Thompson was also instrumental in establishing a festival of Caribbean culture in Porto Velho, where there a Barbadian community. In 2020, she paid an official visit to Olinda, along with the ambassadors of Romania and Ireland. In 2021 during the COVID-19 pandemic Sealy Thompson partnered with the UWI Cave Hill Center for English Language Learning and the Barbados Community College Language Center to create an innovative online English language scholarship program in honor of the multilingual descendants of Barbados in Brazil. Between 2022 and 2023 she has added Argentina, Chile and Paraguay to her areas of jurisdiction as Ambassador.

=== Career in the Arts ===
Sealy Thompson has worked with Senegalese curator, Ms N’Goné Fall, as festival coordinator for the 2nd African Caribbean and Pacific (ACP) Arts Festival in Cape Verde, Brussels and Barbados. She founded the annual Fish & Dragon Festival, a cooperation project between the governments of Barbados and the People's Republic of China, where the first two editions were held in Bridgetown 2015 and 2016 under her direct management and from 2016 - 2019 under the supervision of other directors. She co-founded, with her partner Stefano Harney, the arts project Ground Provisions. This project explores black metaphysics and the politics of reading.

=== Awards ===
- Regents Fellowship, University of California, Berkeley, 2016-2018
- Hadidi Fellowship in Arts and Design, University of California, Berkeley, 2016
- Cervantes Institute, Graduation Prize for outstanding work in Spanish Language and Literature, University of Manchester, 2001
- Barbados National Scholarship, Harrison College, 1996
- Tom Adams Prize for Excellence in Humanities, Harrison College, 1996
