= Ciena =

American telecommunications company

Ciena Corporation
- Type: Public
- Traded as: NYSE: CIEN; S&P 500 component
- Industry: Networking systems & software
- Founded: 1992; 34 years ago
- Founder: David Huber, Optelecom (company), and Kevin Kimberlin
- Headquarters: Hanover, Maryland, U.S.
- Key people: Patrick Nettles (executive chairman); Gary Smith (president & CEO)
- Products: Networking systems and products
- Revenue: ▲US$4.77 billion (2025)
- Operating income: ▲US$198 million (2025)
- Net income: ▲US$123 million (2025)
- Total assets: ▲US$5.86 billion (2025)
- Total equity: ▼US$2.73 billion (2025)
- Number of employees: 9,080 (2025)
- Website: ciena.com

Ciena Corporation is an American optical networking systems and software company based in Hanover, Maryland. The company reported revenues of $4.8 billion and more than 9,000 employees, as of November 2025. Gary Smith has been president and chief executive officer (CEO) since 2003.

Customers include AT&T, Deutsche Telekom, KT Corporation and Verizon Communications.

== History ==
Ciena was founded in 1992 under the name HydraLite by electrical engineer David R. Huber. Optelecom, an optical networking company and Huber's former employer, provided management assistance and production facilities, and co-founder Kevin Kimberlin provided initial equity capital during the formation of the company. Huber engaged William K. Woodruff & Co. to present the idea to John Bayless at Sevin Rosen in November 1993 which resulted in Sevin Rosen investing $1.25 million in April 1994. William K. Woodruff & Co. was a co-manager of Ciena's IPO in February 1997.

Ciena received $40 million in venture capital financing from Charles River Ventures, Japan Associated Finance Co., Star Ventures, and Vanguard Venture Partners. Bayless recruited physicist Patrick Nettles, a former colleague at the telecommunications company Optilink, to be Ciena's first CEO, and Lawrence P. Huang, another former colleague, to accept the sales chief role. Huber and Nettles, changed the company's name to Ciena, in 1994. They began working from an office in Dallas in February 1994; Huber would remain with Ciena until 1995.

The company's first products were introduced in May 1996 to Sprint Corporation. At $195 million, the company's first-year sales were the highest ever recorded by a startup at the time. WorldCom also became an early customer. As of early 1997, Sprint and WorldCom accounted for 97 percent of Ciena's revenue. Ciena began diversifying its clientele and acquiring smaller contracts in 1997.

Ciena went public on NASDAQ in February 1997 with the largest initial public offering by a startup company to date, with a valuation of $3.4 billion. The company's headquarters were relocated to Maryland in March 1997. Ciena earned approximately $370 million in revenue and profits of $110 million for the fiscal year ending in October 1997. Customers at the time included AT&T, Bell Atlantic, and Digital Teleport.

In March 1998, Nettles and Michael Birck of Tellabs began discussing a possible merger. Tellabs announced the purchase of Ciena for $7.1 billion in June. Revenue surpassed $700 million by August 1998, and Ciena had approximately 1,300 employees at the time. The merger was called off. in September 1998 with financial performance and shareholder disapproval cited in the media as reasons.

Ciena 3903 in SVG format

=== Since 2000s ===
During the telecoms crash, Ciena's annual sales decreased from $1.6 billion to approximately $300 million. To address the company's challenges this presented, Gary Smith replaced Nettles as the company's CEO in 2001, and Nettles became executive chairman. The company raised $1.52 billion by selling 11 million shares of stock and $600 million in convertible bonds in 2001. Ciena was the second largest fiber optic networking equipment producer in the U.S. at the time.

While many telecommunications companies experienced downturns during the early 2000s, Ciena's cash influx provided flexibility and allowed the company to expand its product portfolio to include a broader range of advanced networking solutions and other technologies. Ciena also completed a series of strategic acquisitions, buying 11 companies between 1997 and early 2004, spending more than $2 billion to purchase five networking technology companies during 2001 to 2004.

AT&T, which previously tested select Ciena equipment, signed a supply agreement in 2001. In 2002, Ciena reported $361.1 million in sales and a loss of $1.59 billion, and had approximately 3,500 employees. The company was the fourth largest producer of fiber optic equipment in the U.S. by 2003.

In 2003, a federal court jury determined that Corvis Corporation, another fiber optic telecommunications equipment provider established by Huber in 1997, infringed a patent owned by Ciena.

In 2008, Ciena earned $902 million and reported a profit of $39 million. The company earned $653 million and reported a loss of $580 million in 2009; Ciena was generating approximately two-thirds of its revenue in the U.S. at the time. Ciena had net losses until 2015, when the company earned $2.4 billion in sales and posted a $12 million profit. Ciena's global workforce increased from 4,300 in 2011 to 5,345 by October 2015. The company's research and development budget for its Ottawa facilities was approximately $180 million per year, as of 2015.

Ciena earned $2.8 billion in revenue in 2017, and reported annual sales of approximately $3.09 billion in 2018. It crossed the 4 billion mark by 2024. The company ranked number 770 and number 744 on the Fortune 1000 in 2017 and 2018, respectively and ranked 699 in 2024.

=== Acquisitions ===
Company acquired	Year
AstraCom Inc.	1997
ATI Telecom International Ltd.	1998
Terabit Technology Inc.	1998
Lightera Networks Inc.	1999
Omnia Communications Inc.	1999
Cyras Corp.	2001
ONI Systems	2002
WaveSmith Networks Inc.	2003
Akara Corp.	2003
Catena Networks	2004
Internet Photonics	2004
World Wide Packets Inc.	2008
Nortel Metro Ethernet Networks	2010
Cyan	2015
TeraXion Inc.	2016
Packet Design	2016
DonRiver	2018
Centina Systems	2019
Nubis Communications	2025

Ciena acquired the telecommunications company AstraCom Inc. in 1997 for $13.1 million. Fourteen of AstraCom's engineers signed four-year contracts with Ciena, and joined the company's new research and development team in Alpharetta, Georgia. In early 1998, the company acquired Norcross, Georgia–based ATI Telecom International Ltd. and its subsidiary Alta Telecom in a transaction worth $52.5 million. Alta's engineering and installation products were used by service providers for switching, transport, and wireless communications; the company continued to operate as a subsidiary of Ciena. Ciena purchased Terabit Technology Inc., a producer of detectors for data transmission based in Santa Barbara, California, for $11.7 million in April 1998. The company acquired Cupertino, California–based Lightera Networks Inc. and Marlborough, Massachusetts–based Omnia Communications Inc. for $980 million in stock in 1999.

The company purchased Cyras Corp. of Fremont, California, during 2000 to 2001 for $2 billion in stock. ONI Systems, a San Jose, California–based producer of phone and computer data equipment, was acquired by Ciena for $900 million in stock in June 2002. The acquisitions of Cyras, which produced optical switch systems, and ONI, which made transport equipment for data transfer, allowed Ciena to focus on networks in metropolitan areas.

Ciena purchased WaveSmith Networks Inc., an optical-networking equipment manufacturer based in Acton, Massachusetts, for $158 million in stock in 2003. Ciena acquired the Ottawa-based data storage networking company Akara Corp. for $45 million in 2003. Akara expanded Ciena's product line and storage networking capabilities, and continued to operate as a subsidiary. Catena Networks and New Jersey–based Internet Photonics were purchased by Ciena in 2004. The stock transactions were valued at $486.7 million and $150 million, respectively. Catena had approximately 220 employees at the time, and the purchase of Internet Photonics marked Ciena's entrance into the cable industry.

In 2008, Ciena acquired World Wide Packets Inc. (WWP), a Spokane Valley, Washington–based producer of switches and software for Ethernet services, for approximately $296 million. WWP offered the LightningEdge operating system and network management tools, and had more than 100 customers in 25 countries at the time. WWP became a whole owned subsidiary, and the company's office and 65 employees in Spokane, Washington were used by Ciena until mid 2018.

Ciena acquired Nortel's optical technology and Carrier Ethernet division for approximately $770 million during 2009 to 2010. Nortel's Metro Ethernet Networks business developed next-generation optical-transmission equipment and had more than 1,000 customers in 65 countries at the time. The business had approximately 1,400 employees in Canada, including 1,125 in Ottawa and 250 in Montreal. In 2017, Ciena's 1,600 Ottawa personnel were relocated to a new campus in Kanata, Ontario, along with employees of Catena. These 1,600, many of whom worked for Nortel, comprise less than 30 percent of Ciena's workforce, but represent the company's largest operational hub and complete half of its research and development work.

Ciena acquired Cyan, which offers platforms and software systems for network operators, for approximately $400 million in 2015. The assets of TeraXion Inc., a network management system company based in Quebec City, were purchased for $32 million in 2016. Ciena acquired Packet Design, an Austin-based network performance management software company specializing in network optimization, route analytics, and topology, in 2016. In 2018, Ciena purchased software and services company DonRiver for an undisclosed amount.

=== Operations in India ===
Ciena opened a campus in Gurgaon, India, in 2006. The campus focuses on research and development, and was further expanded in 2018 to begin manufacturing products for local markets. There were approximately 1,500 employees on site, representing 20 percent of the company's global workforce, as of May 2018.

Ciena and Sify partnered in mid 2018 to increase the information and communications technology company's network capacity from 100G to 400G. Ciena's converged packet optical products support big data analysis, cloud computing, and the Internet of things across 40 of Sify's data centers in India. In 2019, Bharti Airtel used Ciena equipment to build a 130,000 km photonic control plane network, connecting more than 4,000 locations in India. Ciena provides converged packet optical and Ethernet services to Bharti Airtel, Jio, and Vodafone Idea Limited, and supplies equipment to the Government of India, as of mid 2019.

Rajesh Nambiar was named the chairman and president of Ciena India in mid 2019 until October 2020.

== Products ==
Ciena develops and markets equipment, software and services, primarily for the telecommunications industry and large cloud service firms. Their products and services support the transport and management of voice and data traffic on communications networks.

=== Network infrastructure ===
Ciena's network equipment includes optical network switches and routing platforms to manage data load on telecommunications networks. The company launched its WaveLogic 5 modem platform in 2019. The platform provides network capacity up to 800G. Ciena also provides technology and equipment for undersea cable networks.

=== Software and analytics ===
The company's Blue Planet software platform is used by telecoms companies for programming communications networks, including for network automation. It includes a service that uses machine learning algorithms that analyze anomalies in a network to predict issues, and identify actions for the network operators to take in order to prevent network outages and further disruptions.

== See also ==
- Ciena Optical Multiservice Edge 6500
