= United Nations Department of Safety and Security =

Department of the UN dealing with the security and safety of its staff

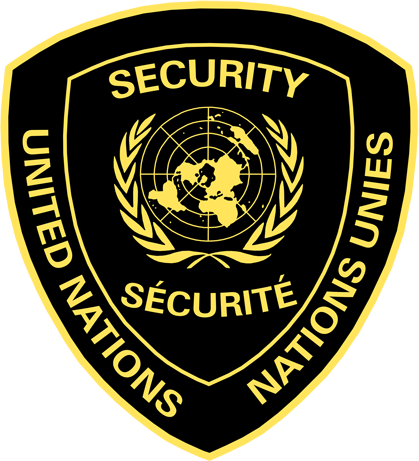
- UNDSS security officer patch
- Abbreviation: DSS
- Formation: January 1, 2005; 21 years ago
- Type: Department of the Secretariat
- Legal status: Active
- Region served: United Nations property, staff, and visitors
- Services: Security management; Security policing; Emergency response
- Head: Jeanine Hennis-Plasschaert, Under-Secretary-General for Safety and Security
- Parent organization: United Nations Secretariat
- Website: un.org/safety-and-security

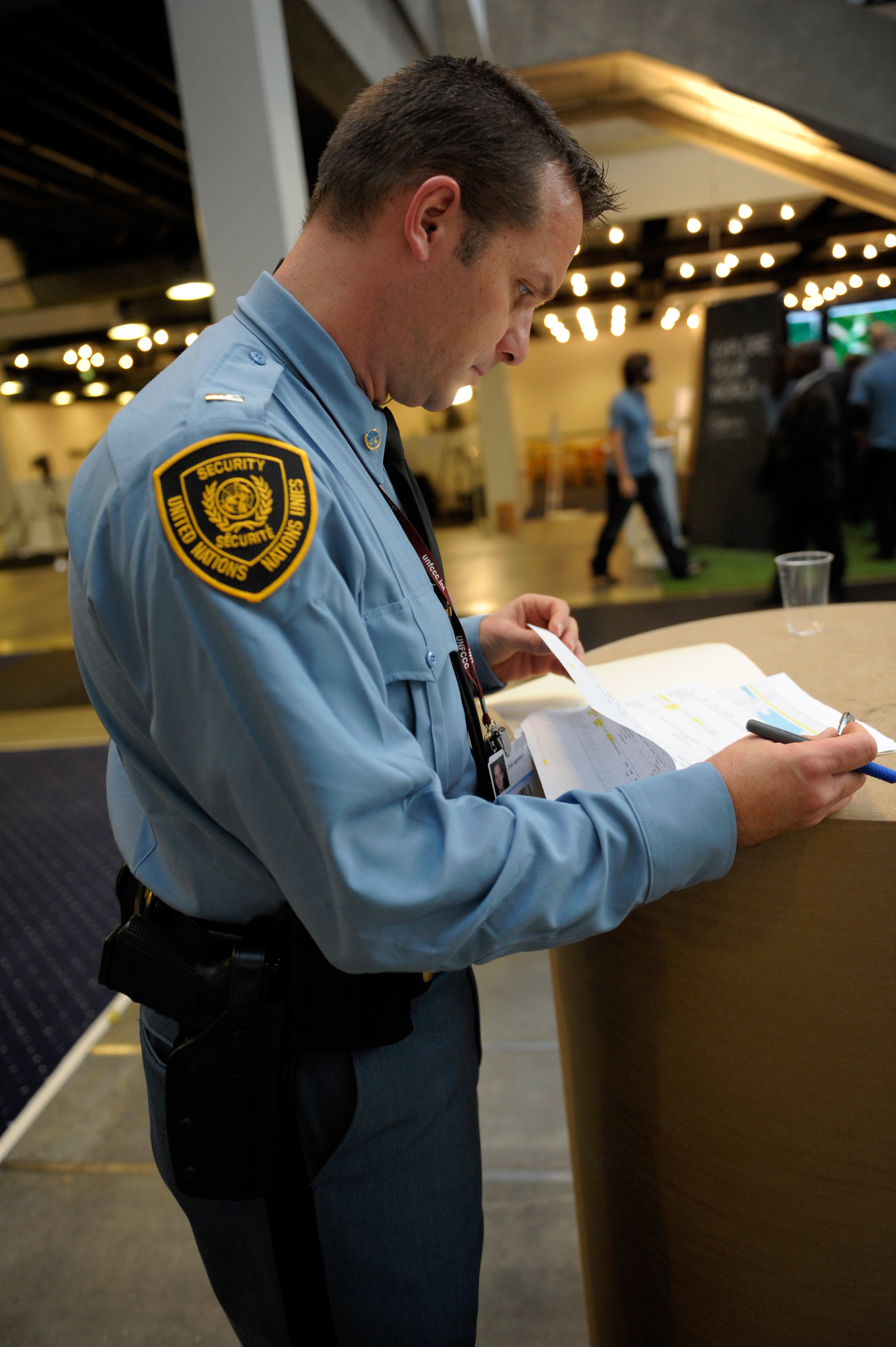
United Nations security officer at the 2009 United Nations Climate Change Conference in Copenhagen.

The United Nations Department of Safety and Security (UNDSS) provides safety and security services for United Nations agencies, facilities and departments as part of the UN Safety Management System. The UNDSS manages a network of security advisers, analysts, officers and coordinators in more than 125 countries in support of around 180,000 United Nations personnel, 400,000 dependents, and 4,500 United Nations premises worldwide. The department is overseen by Under-Secretary-General Jeanine Hennis-Plasschaert of the Netherlands.

== Mandate ==
Mission: To enable United Nations system operations through trusted security leadership and solutions.

Vision: Security for the United Nations, for a better world.

Legal Documents: UN Security is underpinned by five main legal documents, outlining the responsibilities of all stakeholders:

1. United Nations Charter – articles 104 and 105
2. Conventions on Privileges and Immunities of the United Nations (1946 and 1947)
3. Convention on Safety and Security of United Nations Personnel and Associated Personnel (1994) – Optional Protocol (2005)
4. Annual Resolutions of the General Assembly on Safety and Security of UN personnel and associated personnel
5. UNSMS Security Policy Manual

Objectives:

1. Leadership: UNDSS provides critical advice and rapid decision-making capacity on UNSMS (United Nations Security Management System) policy and operational issues to UNSMS members, senior United Nations management and personnel.
2. Security Management: The department provides services with security risk management capabilities and strategies to address multi-dimensional security challenges. The Security Risk Management (SRM) identifies, analyzes and manages safety and security risks to United Nations personnel, assets and operations.
3. Policy: UNDSS supports decision-making process with a solid policy framework with security policies covering all aspects of security management and ensuring cohesion within the UNSMS.
4. Workforce: UNDSS develops and maintains a professional and effective safety and security workforce.
5. Specialized Services: UNDSS delivers specialized safety and security services by offering the necessary expertise to stay ahead of the fast-paced changes in the security environment.

== History ==
For the first half-century of its existence, if UN personnel were directly targeted, it was generally viewed as an isolated event. In the early 1990s, the security environment for the UN changed and became more threatening. There was a rise in the number of deaths and injuries to personnel as a result of malicious acts. The mandate of the UN also evolved, resulting in a larger number of UN personnel, notably from the humanitarian agencies, being deployed on potentially hazardous missions. At the same time, peacekeeping missions were being established in areas at war or in situations of high risk. Increasingly, humanitarian personnel were being deployed alongside peacekeeping military units in integrated multidisciplinary missions.

=== An evolving security management system ===
The UN's security management system was designed for the operational requirements which existed in the UN's early days. To allow the UN to meet new demands in a changing environment, the General Assembly authorized an increase in the staff of the Office of the UN Security Coordinator (UNSECOORD), primarily in the field. In 2001, the General Assembly authorized the creation of a full-time UN Security Coordinator at the level of Assistant Secretary-General. By 2002, the number of professional security officer posts in the field numbered 100 Professional and 200 locally recruited posts.

The UN Security Coordinator oversaw the activities of the UN field security management system and was a senior official appointed by the Secretary-General. The Office was responsible for all policy and procedural matters related to security; to ensure a coherent response by the UN to any emergency situation; coordinating, planning and implementing inter-agency security programmes and acting as the focal point for inter-agency cooperation concerning all security matters and taking decisions related to the relocation/evacuation of personnel and their eligible dependents from very insecure areas.

In addition to UNSECOORD, the Department of Peacekeeping Operations (DPKO) had in place its own separate security structure for civilian personnel in UN peacekeeping operations. Political missions of the Department of Political Affairs that were administratively backstopped by DPKO remained under the UN field security management system. Each of the major UN locations around the world had their own Security and Safety Services, which operated independently from the UN security management system and from any central direction.

The Security and Safety Service (SSS) was first established at UN Headquarters in 1948. For decades, SSS in New York and at seven other Secretariat headquarters locations around the world (Geneva, Vienna, Nairobi, Bangkok, Beirut, Addis Ababa and Santiago), operated independently of each other and had no common governance structure. Their role was to provide security and safety for headquarters personnel, premises and operations at those locations, as well to protect delegates and visitors to the premises and provide personal security details for senior UN officials and visiting dignitaries.

Between 2002 and 2003, efforts were made by the UN Security Coordinator to professionalize the organization's security for its personnel through improved recruitment and training, and to institutionalize security coordination among UN agencies, funds, and programmes through the establishment of an Inter-Agency Security Management Network (IASMN). However, security structures in PKOs and SPMs, as well as in SSS locations continued to function as separate entities to the structure in place for the field.

In early August 2003, independent security experts carried out an analysis of the UN security management system, and concluded that the development and implementation of an overall security governance and accountability framework, including headquarters, humanitarian and development personnel and civilian personnel in peacekeeping missions would lead to a strengthened and unified security management system.

=== The Ahtisaari Panel ===
Despite the growing security concerns and the efforts to address them the UN Headquarters at the Canal Hotel in Baghdad was attacked on 19 August 2003. The attack, carried out by a suicide bomber driving a truck filled with explosives, killed 22 UN personnel and visitors and injured more than 150 people. The attack was the first significant and targeted attack against the UN calling to attention the limited coordination and cohesion of security provisions for UN staff and premises globally. The attacks led to an urgent second review of the security system by the Independent Panel on the Safety and Security of UN Personnel In Iraq led by Martti Ahtisaari, known as the Ahtisaari panel.

Based on information posted on web sites related to global terror groups, the United Nations could in theory be the target of similar attacks anywhere at any time, from Baghdad to Kabul, Nairobi, Jakarta, Geneva or New York. There are no indications that the perpetrators of the two attacks in Baghdad would refrain from attacking other UN targets worldwide if it provided further advantages.

— Ahtisaari Panel report

The Ahtisaari panel called for a new, drastically revised security strategy for the UN. The panel recommended that the core elements of the new strategy include clear articulation of the responsibilities of the UN to ensure the security of its personnel; the establishment of professional assessment tools for the analysis of threat and risks for UN operations worldwide; a robust security management system with adequate disciplinary measures to counter non-compliance; accountability at all managerial levels for the implementation of security regulations; and significant increases in resources to develop and maintain the necessary security infrastructure.

=== UNDSS establishment ===
In 2004, a proposal for strengthening and unifying the UN security management system was presented to the 59th session of the General Assembly in Report A/59/365 of 11 October 2004. This resulted in the adoption of General Assembly Resolution (A/RES/59/276 December 2004) that created the Department of Safety and Security which merged the security management component of the Office of the UN Security Coordinator (UNSECOORD) and the Security and Safety Services (SSS) at Headquarters and at Offices away from Headquarters, (including the regional commissions).

Furthermore, the Resolution mandated that the new department be headed by a senior UN official at the rank of Under-Secretary-General for a non-renewable term of five years. The General Assembly also adopted measures to reinforce security operations in all locations and decided to establish a unified capacity for policy, standards, coordination, communications, compliance and threat and risk assessment.

The UN Department of Safety and Security (UNDSS) was formally established on 1 January 2005.

== Organizational Structure ==
The UNDSS is divided into various divisions and units including:

- Under Secretary General
    - Office of the Under Secretary General
    - Office of the Chief of Staff
      - Strategic Communications Unit
      - Insight and Accountable Unit
      - Policy, Intergovernmental Processes and Partnerships Unit
      - Emergency Response Team (ERT)
      - Operational Resilience Unit
    - Division of Field Operations
      - Field Offices
      - Regional Desks
      - Security Information Analysis Unit
      - Situational Awareness Unit
    - Division of Headquarters Security & Safety Services
      - Security Events Planning Unit (SEPU)
      - Security for Special Events Unit
      - Security and Safety Services for HQ Offices Away from HQs Unit
      - Regional Commissions
      - International Tribunals
  - Assistant Secretary General
    - Office of the Assistant Secretary General
    - Executive office
      - Human Resources Unit
      - Budget and Finances Unit
      - Logistics Unit
      - General Administration Unit
    - Gender Equality & Inclusivity Unit
    - Specialized Services Branch
      - Information Management Unit
      - Training and Development Section (TDS)
      - Physical Security Section (PSS)
      - Protection Coordination Unit
      - Critical Incident Stress Management Section

Some other units they have include Special Services Unit (SSU), Pass and ID Unit, Executive Protection Unit, tactical response team, Security Information and Operations Center (SIOC, located Iraq), K9 Unit, Security & Safety Team, IOM security team, Fire and Safety Unit, and Special Investigation Unit.

== Equipment & ranks ==
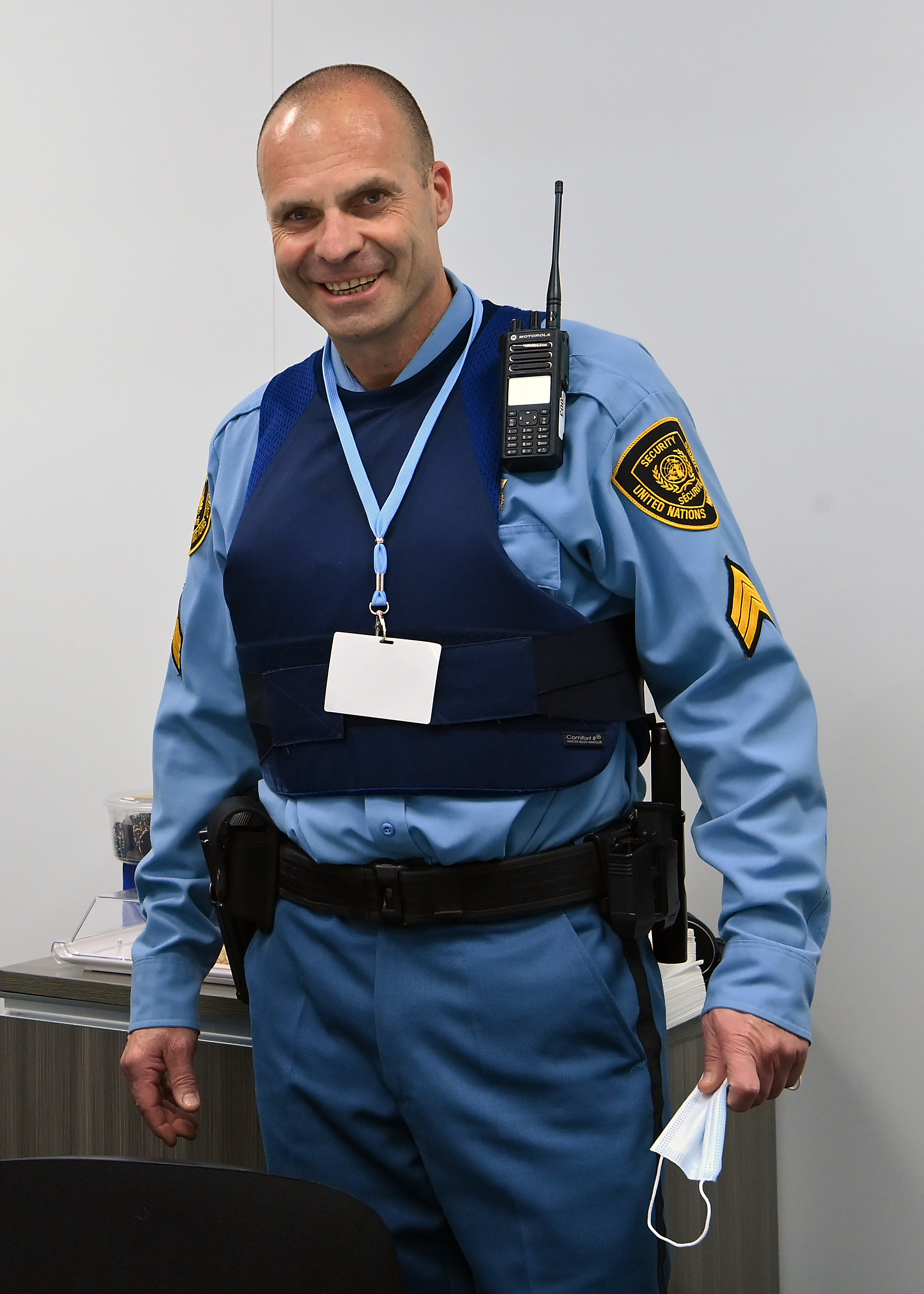
Security officer at COP26, Glasgow

DSS security officers are ranked similar to conventional Western law enforcement, in ascending order from Recruit, Officer, Corporal, Sergeant, Lieutenant, Captain, to Inspector. Officers are routinely armed where permissible by both the United Nations' and host country's firearms regulations and carry the Glock 17 or Glock 19 pistols in caliber 9×19mm Parabellum. Body armor, batons, handcuffs, and two-way radios are also part of the standard equipment.

UN security officer rank structure
Rank	Insignia	Shirt color	Salary grade
Inspector		White	G-7
Captain		White	G-6
Lieutenant		Light blue	G-5
Sergeant		Light blue	G-4
Corporal		Light blue	G-3
Officer	N/A	Light blue	G-2
Recruit	N/A	Light blue	G-1

== Criticism and controversy ==
Despite an official stance by UN working groups against the use of private military and security companies except as a last resort, the UNDSS has widely contracted private military companies across deployments in various nations. Further audits by the United Nations Joint Inspection Unit revealed that despite having the mandate of unifying security responses, the UNDSS suffered from leadership, staffing, and funding issues especially pervasive due to the lack of coordination between UN agencies and multi-leveled bodies of the United Nations Security Management System responsible for ensuring the safety of UN staff.
