= Hult International Business School =

Private business school headquartered in Cambridge, Massachusetts, USA

Coordinates: 42°22′10″N 71°04′25″W

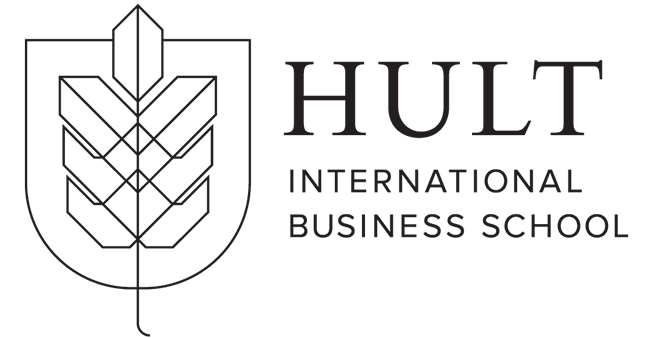
- Former name: Arthur D. Little School of Management
- Motto: For Those Made to Do
- Type: Private business school
- Established: 1964; 62 years ago
- Affiliations: AACSB; AMBA; EQUIS; (triple accreditation)
- President: Matt Lilley
- Faculty: 478
- Students: 2,798
- Undergraduates: 1,266
- Postgraduates: 1,532
- Location: Cambridge, Massachusetts, US; London, England; San Francisco, California, US; Dubai, UAE; New York City, New York, US; Ashridge, England; Boston, Massachusetts, US
- Website: hult.edu

Hult International Business School (also known as Hult Business School or Hult) is a private business school headquartered in Cambridge, Massachusetts, United States. It also operates campuses in London, San Francisco, Dubai, New York City, and Boston. Hult is named for the school's benefactor Bertil Hult and is affiliated with the EF Education First Group.

Hult is the successor of the Arthur D. Little School of Management, founded in 1964 in Cambridge, Massachusetts, and of the Ashridge Business School, founded in 1959 in Ashridge, England. It offers undergraduate, master's, and MBA degree programs, as well as executive education through Hult Ashridge, housed on the Ashridge Estate campus. The school is also the patron of the Hult Prize, a student entrepreneur competition.

== History ==
=== American background ===
The Arthur D. Little School of Management was founded in 1964 by Arthur Dehon Little in Cambridge, Massachusetts. Originally developed as an executive management education program, the school began to grant degrees after receiving full accreditation by the New England Association of Schools and Colleges in 1976. In 1996, the Arthur D. Little School of Management formed a partnership with Boston College's Carroll School of Management in order to share access to faculty and facilities.

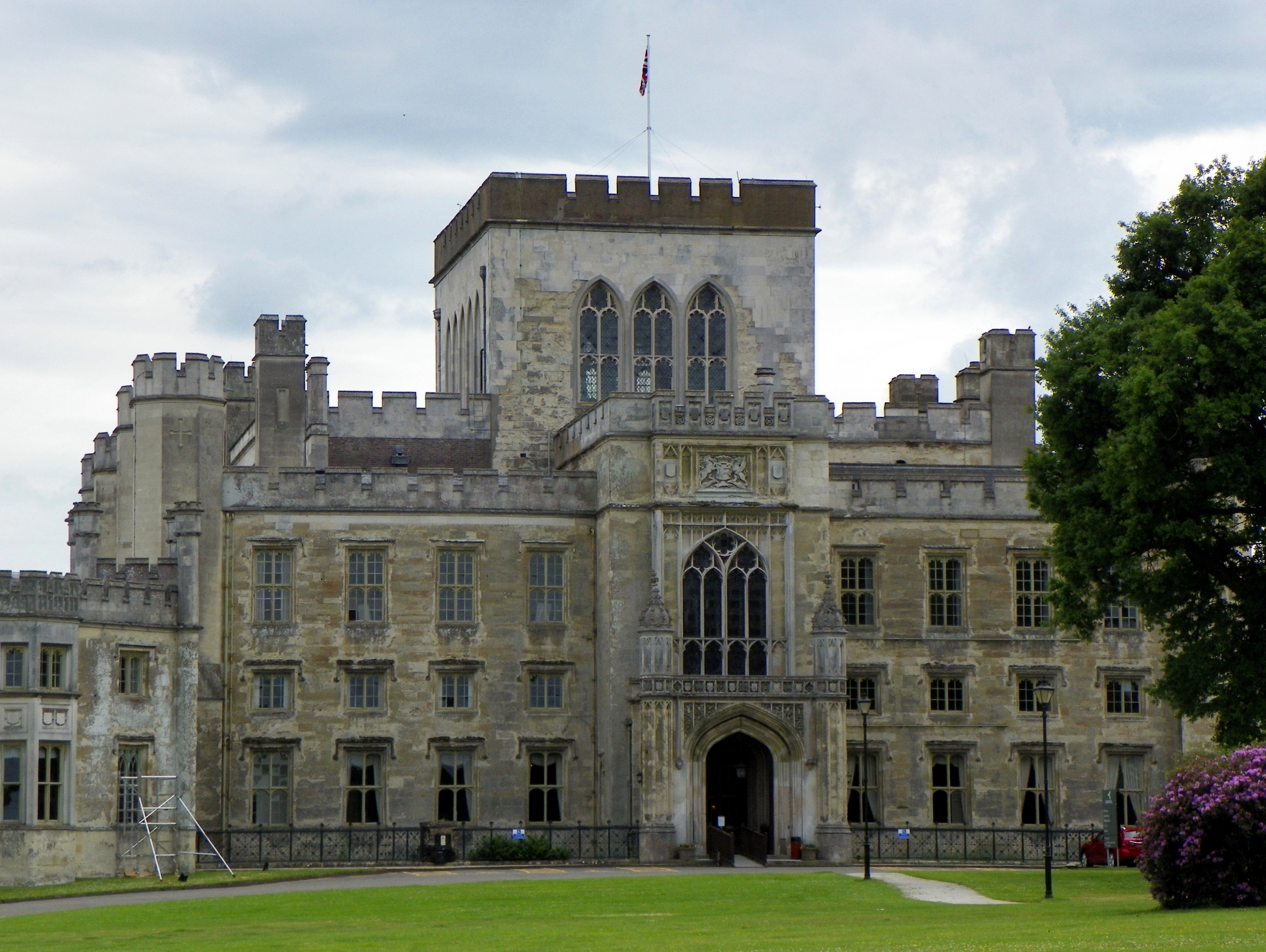
Hult Ashridge's executive education program, housed in Ashridge House, was ranked in the UK's top 10 programs in 2014.

=== British background ===
In 1929, Ashridge was formally established as the College of Citizenship with the backing of the Conservative Party. In 1959, the college was re-established as a school of management under the name Ashridge Business School.

=== Contemporary history ===
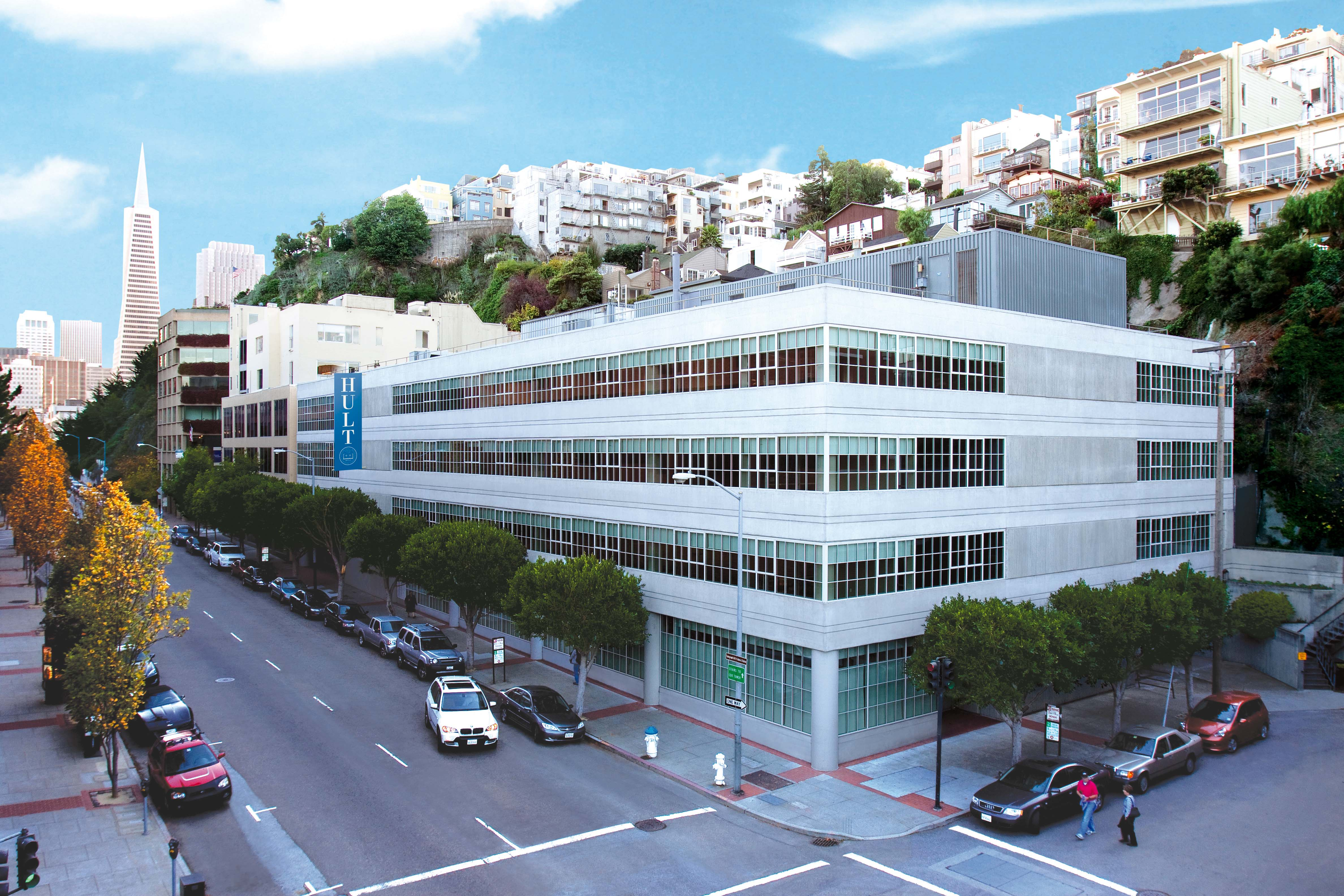
Hult's San Francisco campus is located in the North Beach neighborhood, by Telegraph Hill.

In 2002 Arthur D. Little declared bankruptcy and the for-profit educational branch of the Washington Post, Kaplan Education, initiated the purchase of the Arthur D. Little School of Management (which had then changed its name to the Concord School of Management), but subsequently decided against the plan. At the time, the school had 26 students. The same year, Swedish billionaire Bertil Hult purchased the Arthur D. Little School of Management, which resulted in the school's reorganization and reestablishment as Hult International Business School in 2003.

Under its restructuring, Hult established a new curriculum oriented on international business, which led to the establishment of Hult's global campuses in Dubai (2008), San Francisco (2010), Shanghai (2011), and New York (2014).

In 2007, Hult acquired Huron University in London, a private American university located in London's Bloomsbury neighborhood, which subsequently was reestablished as Hult International Business School's London campus.

In 2008, Hult opened its Dubai campus in Dubai International Academic City, initially welcoming 130 students. In 2012, it relocated to Dubai Internet City, offering three postgraduate degrees, including a full-time MBA, a part-time Executive MBA and a master's degree in business. Subsequently in 2025, undergraduate programmes for marketing and entrepreneurship were added to the portfolio.

In 2014, Hult International Business School acquired and merged with Ashridge Business School, creating one of the largest business schools in the world. After 2015, the two schools began operating as a singular entity, with the establishment of Ashridge Executive Education as Hult's executive program.

Hult opened its undergraduate campus in London, near the City of London financial centre, in 2014.

The Economist Intelligence Unit, supported by Hult International Business School, launched the Business Professor of the Year Award in 2012.

By 2014 Hult had become the world's largest graduate business school by enrollment.

In 2018, Hult received its latest accreditation from EQUIS, adding to its existing AACSB and AMBA accreditations. In addition, Hult International Business School holds institutional accreditation from the New England Commission of Higher Education (NECHE). NECHE records 1976 as Hult's initial accreditation year, with its last comprehensive evaluation visit taking place in 2017. The next visit is scheduled for 2027.

In 2022, Matt Lilley took over as president of Hult International Business School. The same year, Hult revised its Business Administration (BBA) programme, replacing it with practical, team-based challenge modules, as well as regular coaching and feedback to encourage continuous skills development. This revision to the undergraduate programme aims to provide students with the knowledge needed to bridge the gap between employer requirements and employee capabilities.

In 2023, the Office for Students (OfS) made an order granting Hult International Business School Ltd time-limited powers to award taught degrees. This authorisation is valid from October 2023 to January 2027, during which time Hult is authorised to grant taught awards up to Level 7 for subjects related to business and management.

== Campuses ==
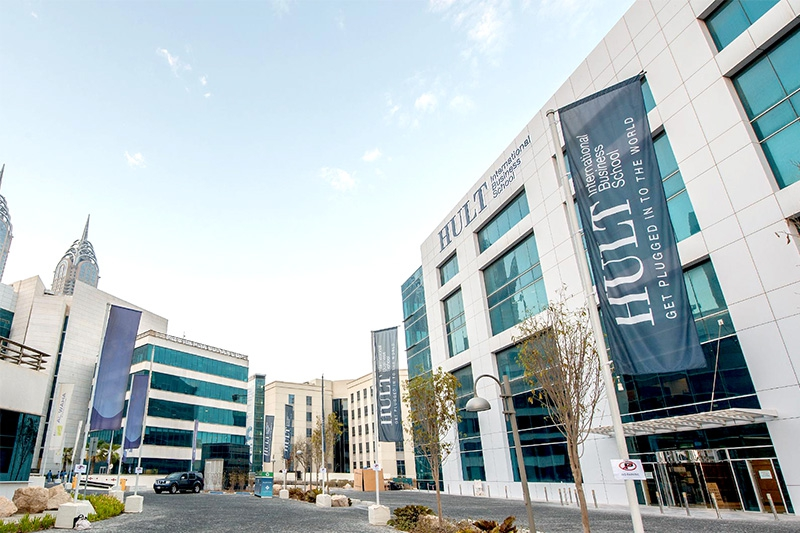
Hult campus in Dubai.

Hult maintains 7 campuses across 3 countries and serves approximately 3,000 students: two undergraduate and postgraduate campuses (London and Boston), three postgraduate campuses that serve as summer rotational campuses (San Francisco, Shanghai and Dubai) one solely postgraduate campuses (New York City), and one executive education campus (Ashridge Estate in Hertfordshire, United Kingdom). Furthermore, Hult set up a campus in Singapore for summer elective and city seminar opportunities. Students are encouraged to rotate between campuses during their programs.

Hult operates separate undergraduate and postgraduate campuses in London. Hult House East, the undergraduate campus, is located in Aldgate East, while the postgraduate campus is located between Holborn and Bloomsbury.

The Hult London Undergraduate Campus, built by British firm Sergison Bates Architects, won the Royal Institute of British Architects National Award in 2015.

=== Facilities ===
The Hult House complex is located in Cambridge. The 12-storey, mixed-use building comprises student accommodation, classrooms, offices, and communal facilities, including fitness and social spaces. The planning documents specified around 500 beds, ten study lounges, a cafeteria, a gym, a lobby café and outdoor recreation space.

Hult House East is based in a converted nineteenth-century brewery that was adapted by Sergison Bates Architects. The building contains classrooms, study spaces, meeting rooms and roof terraces, and retains elements of the former industrial structure.The project had a contract value of £3.7 million and a gross internal area of 4,300 square metres. The conversion also involved installing an open timber staircase in the former atrium. The existing timber and concrete floors, as well as the freestanding columns, were retained.

Teaching at Ashridge takes place within the Ashridge House estate, which provides flexible classrooms, collaborative spaces, residential accommodation, and recreational facilities. Ashridge House is a Gothic Revival mansion built in the early nineteenth century on the site of the College of Bonhomme, which was founded in 1283.

== Academics ==
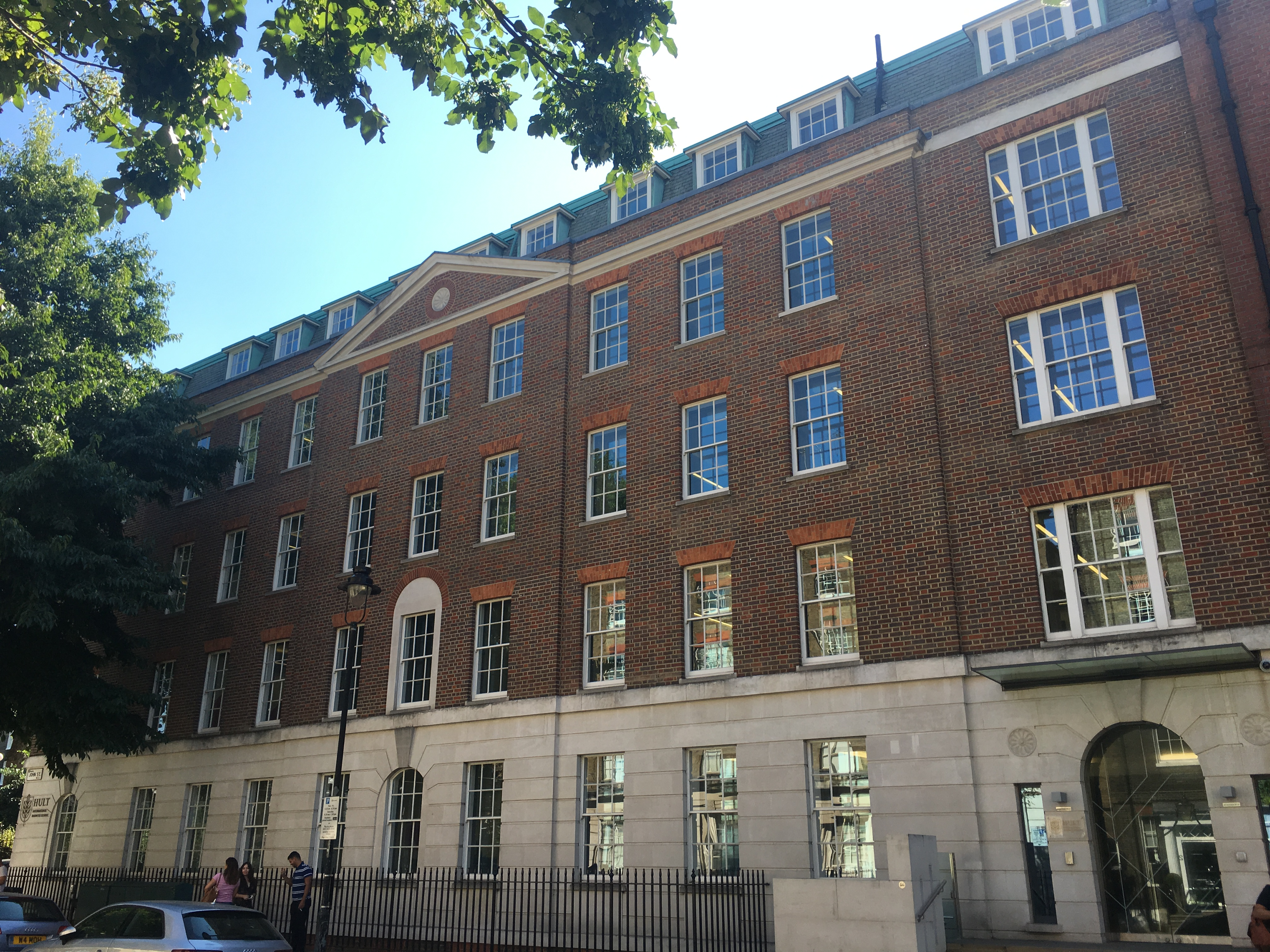
Hult's London postgraduate campus is located in the Bloomsbury district.

Business school rankings

United States
- Bloomberg MBA: 60

Hult conducts business and market research out of its global research centers.

As of 2026, Hult offers undergraduate programmes in Business Administration, Computer Science for Business, Entrepreneurship, and Psychology, Economics & Politics. A Master's programme can be studied in a number of areas, including International Business, Business Analytics & AI, Finance, Marketing, Marketing with Analytics, Marketing with Communications and Branding, or an Executive postgraduate programme. Additionally, a one-year Global Master of Business Administration programme is offered in Boston, Dubai or London.

MBA students receive access to Coursera courses, micro-credentials and industry skills certificates alongside their degree. Hult also offers a part-time Doctorate in Business Administration and Organisational Change, delivered through a hybrid study program.

Hult Impact Research comprises several research units. These include the Sustainability Lab and the Leadership Lab. The Sustainability Lab studies the sustainability transitions of industries and societies in relation to the UN Sustainable Development Goals. Meanwhile, the Leadership Lab focuses on leadership capability and learning.

Hult International Business School has an acceptance rate of 54%. As of 2026, Hult has over 37,000 alumni in over 170 countries. The same year, Hult partnered with the AI software platform Lovable for the Computer Science for Business programme, incorporating the development of digital products into the coursework.

Student life involves events organised by the Student Life team on campus. The team is also responsible for student-led clubs and societies.

The Carnegie Classification of Institutions of Higher Education classifies Hult as a More Selective Institution.

=== Rankings ===
Hult's Master of International Business program was ranked #17 in The Economist's ranking of Masters in Management programs worldwide in 2019.

In 2020, Hult's Ashridge Executive Education was ranked #16 in the Financial Times Executive Education Top 50 Schools list.

In 2022, Hult's Executive MBA was ranked among the top 100 in the world in the QS International Trade Rankings.

=== EY Tech MBA by Hult ===
On 1 July 2020, Hult and Ernst & Young (EY) announced the EY Tech MBA by Hult, consisting of online learning, practical experiences, insight papers and a capstone project. This MBA is now offered by EY free to all its people, regardless of rank or location and can be done over any duration. The curriculum is updated every four months.

== Hult Prize ==
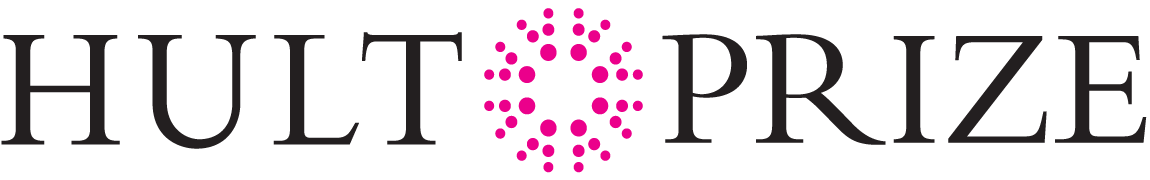
The Hult Prize is hosted in cooperation with the United Nations Foundation and the Clinton Initiative.

Hult International Business School is the lead sponsor of the Hult Prize (formerly Hult Global Case Challenge), an annual international case competition launched in 2010 that asks students to find solutions to global social challenges. The Prize is a partnership between Hult International Business School, the Clinton Global Initiative, and the United Nations Foundation.

The best teams from each regional event advance to a global final, at which a single winning team is chosen. Bertil Hult provides a $1 million cash grant to help fund the winning solution.

== Notable alumni ==
- Luis Abinader, President of the Dominican Republic
- Nataliey Bitature, 2016 World Economic Forum's Top 5 African Innovators & 2014 Forbes 30 Under 30
- Juan Cohen, parliamentarian in the Central American Parliament
- Mbaranga Gasarabwe, United Nations Assistant Secretary-General for Safety and Security
- Shaun Gregory, CEO of Exterion Media
- Mbaranga Gasarabwe, United Nations Assistant Secretary-General for Safety and Security
- André Bier Gerdau Johannpeter, CEO of Gerdau
- Htin Kyaw, 9th President of Myanmar
- Walter Bayly Llona, CEO of Credicorp
- Thabo Mbeki, 2nd President of South Africa
- Hixonia Nyasulu, chairwoman of Sasol
- Oba Otudeko, founder of Honeywell Group and Forbes Africa's 40 Richest
- Tonika Sealy-Thompson, Barbados' ambassador to Brazil
- Anil Shastri, Indian parliamentarian; son of former Prime Minister Lal Bahadur Shastri
- Gary Smith, CEO of Ciena

== See also ==
- Hult Prize
- EF Education First
