= Hult Prize =

International prize for social enterprise

- Reward: $1 million USD prize
- Final award: Startup Rutopia from Instituto Tecnológico y de Estudios Superiores de Monterrey Mexico
- Website: www.hultprize.org
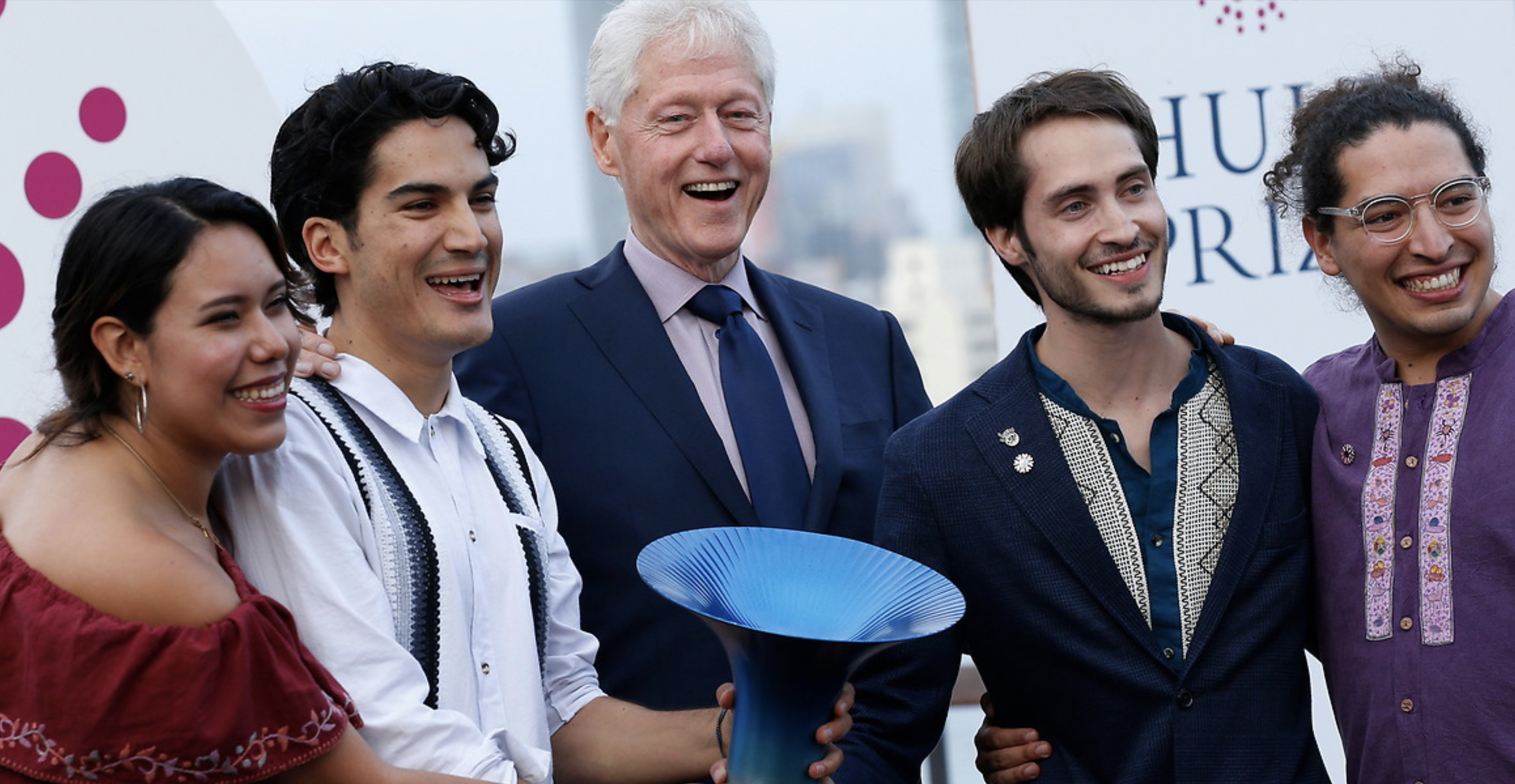

The Hult Prize is an annual competition for ideas solving pressing social issues, such as food security, water access, energy, and education. Named for Bertil Hult, the prize is awarded to college students, and has been referred to as the "Nobel Prize for students". (Note: As per Muhammad Yunus)

Former U.S. president Bill Clinton selects the challenge topic and announces the winner each September, with the selected idea receiving US$1 million in seed capital to be launched into a social enterprise.

== History ==
A lecture given by One Laptop Per Child chief operating officer Charles Kane sparked the idea for a business case competition focused on solving global problems via social entrepreneurship. In March 2010, MBA students Ahmad Ashkar, Tamara Sam, Carolin Bachmann, Jose Escobar and Nabil Chaachou launched the Hult Global Case Challenge, later renamed the Hult Prize. Students from around ninety business schools competed at three Hult campuses in Dubai, London and Boston.

In 2011, the competition expanded into five regional rounds at Hult campuses around the globe (Shanghai, Dubai, London, Boston and San Francisco) with the winning team from each region continuing to the Global Finals in New York City. President Bill Clinton first announced the Hult Prize Winner (still called the Hult Global Case Challenge at the time) in 2011, and has done so in each subsequent year. In 2012, the competition expanded to include three tracks - energy, housing and education - and the Global Final was held at the New York Public Library. By 2013, the Prize attracted more than 10,000 MBA and undergraduate applicants.

Many major business schools run internal competitions to pre-qualify teams, which they then send into the competition. In 2018, more than 250,000 students from over 100 countries participated in the Hult Prize, competing for a total of $5m in prize money. As of 2017, the Hult Prize is at 1,000 universities around the world.

In 2021, the Hult Prize was suspended due to an investigation into sexual misconduct at a "summer camp-style event" it operates, the investigation was conducted by Kirkland & Ellis resulting in the replacement of the entire Hult Prize senior leadership team, including its Founder and CEO Ahmad Ashkar and staff member, Nelly Andrade.

== Organizations ==
=== Programs ===
Since its launch in 2010, The Hult Prize has launched several programs. The original competition is now the Hult Prize Flagship Competition, with other programs being the Hult Prize Regionals, Hult Prize on Campus, the Hult Prize Accelerator and the Hult Prize Summit. The flagship event continues to be the Annual Global Summit and Awards Gala hosted at the United Nations with its US$1,000,000 award for social entrepreneurship.

== Competitions ==
=== 2010: Early childhood education ===
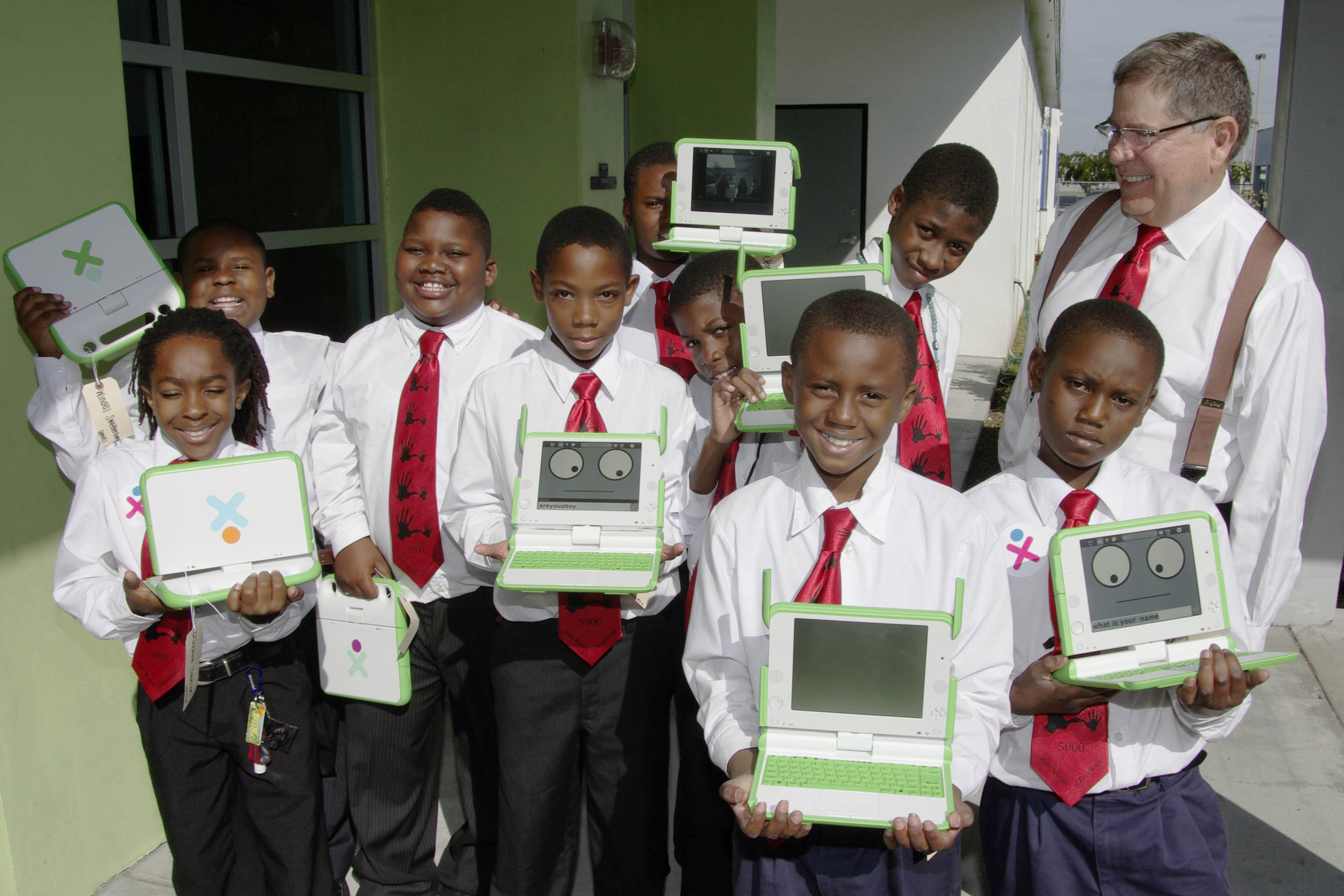
Children with laptops from One Laptop Per Child, a non-profit organization and the case study of the 2010 inaugural Hult Global Case Challenge.

The inaugural Hult Prize was held as The Global Case Challenge and participants sought ways to support and scale the impact of One Laptop Per Child's mission in developing, producing and distributing affordable laptops, particularly for developing countries.

=== 2011: Global water crisis ===
In 2011, the Hult competition focused on the topic of clean water. Participants were challenged to provide and improve clean water and sanitation ways for the more than 2.5 billion people worldwide, that don't have access to it. The competition was held in partnership with Matt Damon and Water.org. The prize was awarded to a team from Cambridge University, led by Akanksha Hazari, with their proposal turning into the social enterprise m. Paani, working on digital ways to provide safe water, education, healthcare, energy, nutrition and mobility to rural Indian communities.

=== 2012: Housing, education and energy ===
In 2012, the Hult competition revolved around global energy poverty, seeking to support the many people worldwide, that still live without electricity. The challenge was focused on removing the use of kerosene lamps in Africa by 2018. The winner was a group from New York University Abu Dhabi, consisting of international students. The group was priced for their solution to supply solar lighting. To apply the student's ideas, NGO SolarAid was awarded with a part of the prize money.

=== 2013: The Global Food Crisis ===
Due to the fact that nearly one billion people worldwide are still suffering from hunger, the Hult Prize 2013 focused on the Global Food Crisis. The 2013 topic was personally chosen by Bill Clinton. The prize went to Aspire Food from McGill University for the idea of processing edible insects to produce a sustainable source of protein. This way providing slum communities with an easier and better access to essential nutrients.

=== 2014: Solving Non-Communicable Disease in the Urban Slum ===
The 2014 Hult Prize concentrated on Healthcare: Non-Communicable Disease in the Urban Slums. The students were challenged to build sustainable and scalable social enterprises to fight again non-communicable disease in slums. The prize was awarded to a group of five alumni from Indian School of Business (ISB). The winning team, Nano Health, suggested the education and employment of health workers, who would run screening camps, help to diagnose diseases and support citizens in lifestyle changes. The health workers were equipped with "Doc-in-a-Box" – a diagnostic tool for basic health indicators. Nano Health is supported by various industrial partners, including GVK Biosciences, who supported with the project with their tool HEART (Health Emphasized Analytical and Reporting Tool).

=== 2015: Early Childhood Education ===
In 2015, the prize challenged teams to find solutions for the early childhood education gap (0–6 years old kids). The winning team was IMPCT from the IMBA Program at National Chengchi University in Taiwan. The team developed PlayCare, a micro-equity platform, where everyone can invest in sustainable education businesses under a profit-sharing-model. The education businesses, like care centers in urban slums, supports also with educational efforts and increasing enrollment. The team also named Ann Louie Li their Founding Ambassador, who pioneered the social media movement 'Creating an #IMPCT'.

=== 2016: Crowded urban spaces ===
The 2016 Hult Prize challenge for teams participating was to present the idea for a business that would double the income of 1 million people in the developing world by 2022. The prize was awarded to a team from Earlham College whose business idea, Magic Bus Ticketing, focused on improving the public transportation system in Kenya.

Judges at the 2016 competition were: Mohammed Ashour, CEO of Aspire Food Group, the late Bob Collymore, CEO of Safaricom, Brian Fetherstonhaugh, Chairman & CEO of OgilvyOne, Kathleen Rogers, President of Earth Day, Premal Shah, President and co-founder of Kiva and Muhammad Yunus, 2006 Nobel Peace Prize recipient.

=== 2017: Refugees – Reawakening Human Potential ===
In 2017, the Hult competition centered the motion of humanity, and the ensuing massive demographic shifts, which pressure social, political, and physical infrastructures. The Competition was won by Roshni Rides from Rutgers University.

=== 2018: Transform – Harnessing the Power of Energy ===
In 2018, the prize challenged student teams, from 121 countries to find and evolve energy innovations to enhance million of lives. The Hult Prize assumes, that it is necessary for the world to find more disruption that taps into energy innovations. The competition was won by team SunRice from University College London.

=== 2019: Global Youth Unemployment ===
In 2019, a team of Mexican entrepreneurs from the Tec de Monterrey won the Hult Prize with a project/start-up named Rutopía. The contest focused on global youth unemployment and attracted more than 250,000 participants from around the world.

=== 2020: Climate Change ===
In 2020, participants had to come up with a customer-centric business model that had a net positive environmental impact with every transaction made. Due to the pandemic, the accelerator was moved online and the $1M prize was split among 10 teams +1 jolly.

=== 2021: Food for Good ===
2021 Hult Prize challenged students to rethink our broken food systems by transforming food into a vehicle for change. Each of seven teams were selected as 2021 Hult Prize Winners.

=== 2022: Getting the World Back to Work ===
2022 Hult Prize challenged the students to rethink how the can get the world back to work. In this year EcoBana from St. Paul's University in Limuru, Kenya won the Hult prize.

== Partnerships ==
In 2010, the competition focused on education in partnership with One Laptop Per Child. The 2011 event partnered with water.org to focus on the provision of clean water.
