= Hult Ashridge =

English executives education programme

Coordinates: 51°47′57″N 0°33′35″W

Hult Ashridge Executive Education
- Other name: Hult Ashridge
- Former names: Ashridge Business School; Ashridge Management College; Ashridge Executive Education
- Type: Business school for executive education
- Established: 1959
- Parent institution: Hult International Business School
- Accreditation: Triple accreditation
- President: Stephen Hodges
- Administrative staff: 400 +
- Location: Hertfordshire, England
- Campus: Ashridge Estate
- Website: hultashridge.com

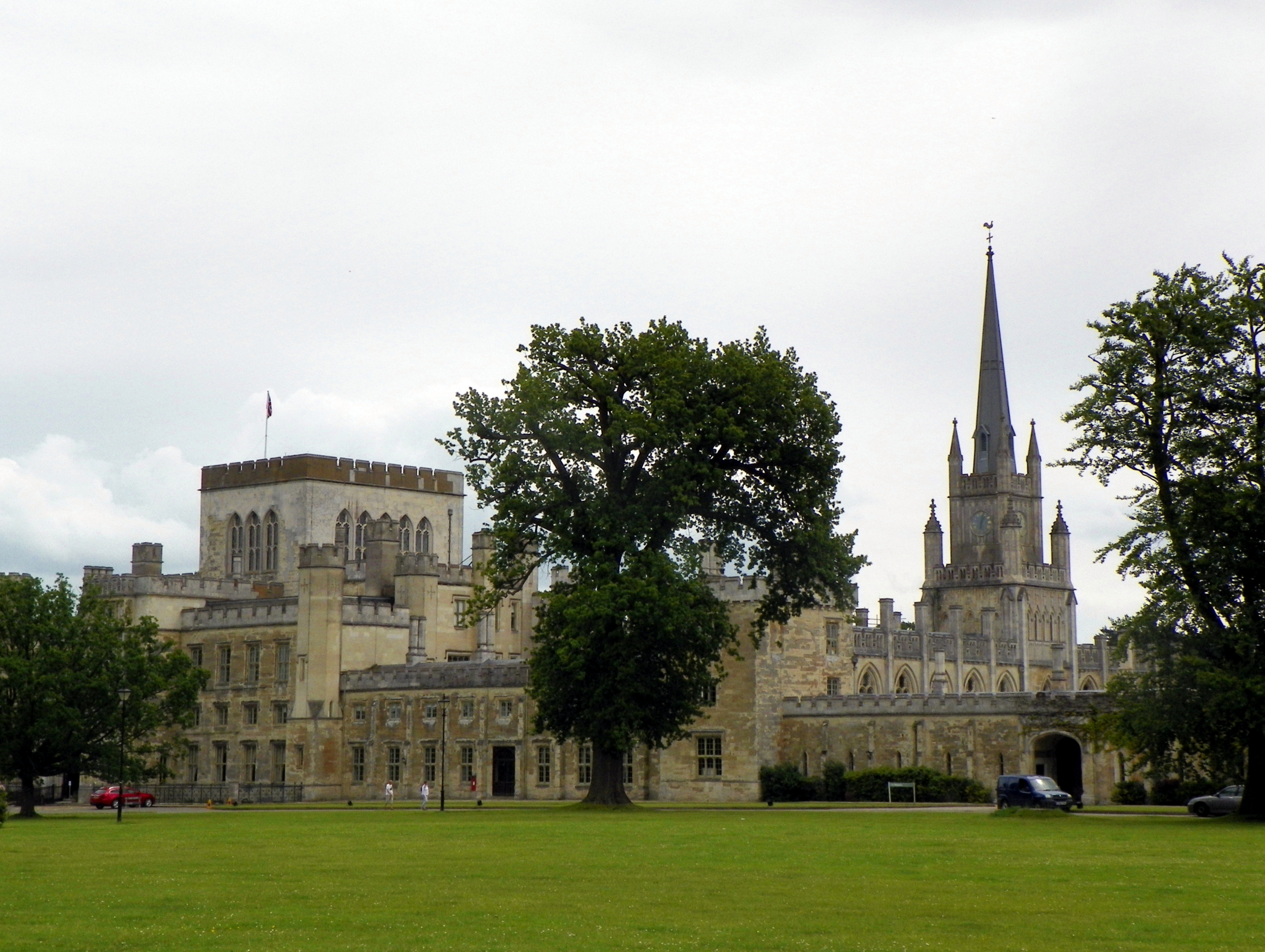
Hult Ashridge Executive Education, housed in Ashridge House, is ranked one of the UK's top 10 business schools.

Hult Ashridge Executive Education (also known as the Hult Ashridge) is the executive education arm of Hult International Business School, based in Hertfordshire, England, on the Ashridge Estate.

Formerly an independent business school, known as Ashridge Business School, Ashridge completed an operational merger with Hult in 2015. It offers teaching in the fields of leadership and organisational development.

== History ==
The college was conceived at Ashridge House in 1921, when the house was acquired by a trust established by Bonar Law, a future UK Prime Minister; in 1929 it became a "College of Citizenship", established to help the Conservative Party develop its intellectual forces in struggles with left-wing organisations such as the Fabian Society. It became a cross between a think-tank and a training centre and had Arthur Bryant as its educational adviser.

After the Second World War, the "College of Citizenship" was briefly re-established but in 1959 it was re-launched with a new focus on management training, taking the name Ashridge Management College.

In 2015, the then Ashridge Business School operationally merged with Hult International Business School, an international business school with campuses in seven cities around the world. As part of the merger, Ashridge Business School changed its name to Ashridge Executive Education.

== Organization and administration ==
=== Constitution ===
Ashridge Business School is constituted as a registered charity, formally named the Ashridge (Bonar Law Memorial) Trust, and is one of the 150 largest UK charitable organisations ranked by annual expenditure. The trust has the following goals: (a) honouring the memory of a great statesman, (b) the preservation of the house and grounds as an historic building, (c) to create an educational centre (d) to train lecturers, speakers and writers to further the study of the subjects outlined above (e) provide lectures and/or discussions on these subjects open to the public or for those who had paid fees to attend, (f) provide a supporting staff, (g) to allow boarding by those attending the lectures and discussions.

=== Faculty ===
Ashridge employs approximately 95 full-time academic staff and has a further 100 associate faculty members. Faculty members are not traditional academics – the majority combine significant academic qualifications with extensive international business experience, enabling them to become fully involved with the issues and challenges faced by clients and individual participants. Academic staff regularly serve on the councils of international educational and advisory bodies, including the Graduate Management Admission Council (GMAC), European Foundation for Management Development (EFMD) and Association of MBAs (AMBA). They also share their expertise as visiting professors at many international business schools and universities.

== See also ==
- Ashridge
- Ashridge Priory
