= Economy of the Dominican Republic =

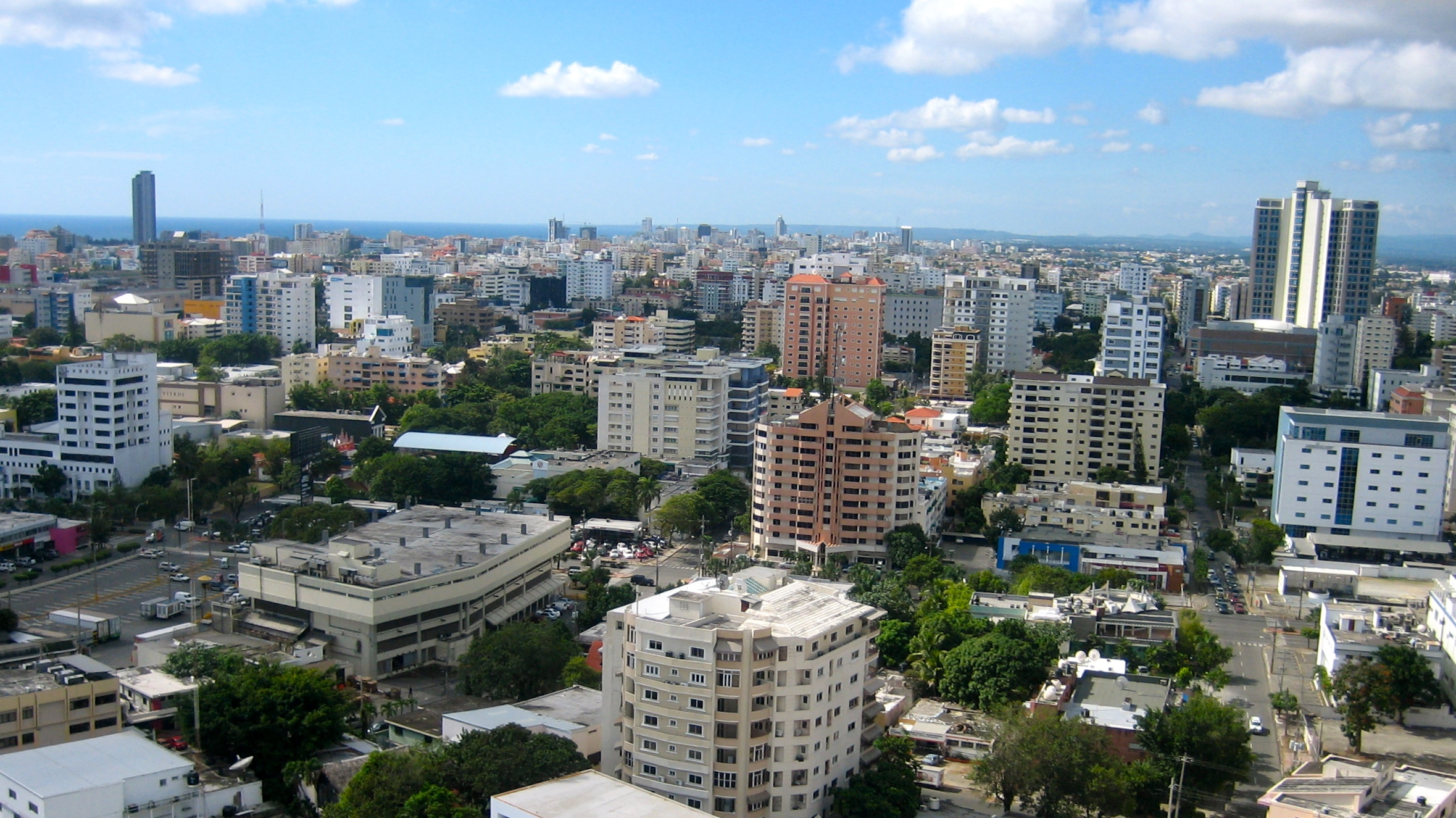
- Santo Domingo is the capital and financial center of the Dominican Republic
- Currency: 1 Dominican Peso (RD$) = 100 Centavos
- Fiscal year: Calendar year
- Trade organizations: WTO, CAFTA-DR
- Country group: Developing/Emerging; Upper-middle income economy

Statistics
- Population: ▲10,771,504 (2022 census)
- GDP: ▲$145.36 billion (nominal, 2026); ▲$357.75 billion (PPP, 2026)
- GDP rank: 63rd (nominal, 2026); 62nd (PPP, 2026)
- GDP growth: ▲4.6% (2026); ▲4.4% (2027f); ▲4.6% (2028f)
- GDP per capita: ▲$13,245 (nominal, 2026); ▲$32,597 (PPP, 2026)
- GDP per capita rank: 77th (nominal, 2026); 71st (PPP, 2026)
- GDP by sector: agriculture: 5.5%; industry: 33.8%; services: 60.8% (2017 est.)
- Inflation (CPI): 3.564% (2018)
- Population below national poverty line: 30.5% (2016 est); 23.9% (2021 est)
- Gini coefficient: ▲38.5 medium (2021)
- Human Development Index: ▲0.776 high (2023) (89th); ▲0.634 medium IHDI (78th) (2023)
- Labor force: 5.278 million (2022 est.)
- Labor force by occupation: agriculture: 14.6%; industry: 22.3%; services: 63.1% (2005)
- Unemployment: 7.1% (2022 est.)
- Main industries: ferronickel and gold mining, textiles, cement, tobacco, and sugar production, tourism

External
- Exports: $11 billion (2019 est.)
- Export goods: ferronickel, sugar, gold, silver, coffee, cocoa, tobacco, meats, consumer goods
- Main export partners: United States 50.8% Haiti 11.8% Switzerland 10% India 7.5% Canada 6.2% (2017 est.)
- Imports: $20 billion (2019 est.)
- Import goods: foodstuffs, petroleum, cotton and fabrics, chemicals and pharmaceuticals
- Main import partners: United States 44.7% China 14.2% Mexico 8.3% Brazil 6.5% Chile 4.7% (2017 est.)
- FDI stock: $42 billion (31 December 2019 est.)
- Gross external debt: $29.69 billion (31 December 2017 est.)

Public finance
- Government debt: 37.7% of GDP (2017 est.)
- Foreign reserves: $14.5 billion (March 2022 est.)
- Revenue: $14.10 billion (2021 est.)
- Spending: $16.60 billion (2021 est.)
- Credit rating: BB− (Domestic); BB− (Foreign); BB (T&C Assessment) (Standard & Poor's)
- All values, unless otherwise stated, are in US dollars.

The economy of the Dominican Republic is the seventh largest in Latin America, and is the largest in the Caribbean and Central American region. The Dominican Republic is an upper-middle income developing country with important sectors including mining, tourism, manufacturing (medical devices, electrical equipment, pharmaceuticals, and chemicals), energy, real estate, infrastructure, telecommunications and agriculture.

The Dominican Republic is on track to achieve its goal of becoming a high-income country by 2030, and is expected to grow 79% in this decade. The country is the site of the single largest gold mine in Latin America, the Pueblo Viejo mine. Although the service sector is currently the leading employer of Dominicans (due principally to growth in tourism and free-trade zones), agriculture remains an important sector in terms of the domestic market and is in second place (behind mining) in terms of export earnings.

== Economic history ==
Following independence, the economy relied heavily on primary commodity exports, primarily tobacco, coffee, and cacao. In the late 19th century, large-scale sugar plantations took root, transforming the country into a classic export-led economy highly vulnerable to fluctuating global sugar prices. Heavy foreign debt led the United States to take control of Dominican customs in 1905, followed by a military occupation from 1916 to 1924, which centralized and modernized state finances.

During his 31-year dictatorship, Rafael Trujillo centralized vast portions of the economy—especially the agricultural sector and newly built manufacturing plants—into his personal and family fortune. In the 1950s, the regime initiated state-led Import substitution industrialization (ISI) to promote local industries (like textiles and distilling) and established the country's first Free Trade Zone.

Under President Joaquín Balaguer (starting in 1966), the country experienced rapid but unequal economic growth, focusing on massive infrastructure projects and sugar production. Hit hard by the 1970s oil crises and slumping sugar prices in the 1980s, the country aggressively diversified, the focus shifted away from agriculture into export-assembly manufacturing (maquiladoras), free trade through the Dominican Republic–Central America Free Trade Agreement (CAFTA-DR) and tourism.

== Causes and other correlations ==
Tourism accounts for more than $7.4 billion in annual earnings in 2019. Free-trade zone earnings and tourism are the fastest-growing export sectors. A leading growth engine in the Free-trade zone sector is the production of medical equipment for export having a value-added per employee of US$20,000, total revenue of US$1.5 billion, and a growth rate of 7.7% in 2019. The medical instrument export sector represents one of the highest-value added sectors of the country's economy, a true growth engine for the country's emerging market. Remittances are an important sector of the economy, contributing US$8.2 billion in 2020. Most of these funds are used to cover household expenses, such as housing, food, clothing, health care and education. Secondarily, remittances have financed businesses and productive activities. Thirdly, this combined effect has induced investment by the private sector and helps fund the public sector through its value-added tax. The combined import market including the free-trade-zones amounts to a market of $20 billion a year in 2019. The combined export sector had revenues totaling $11 billion in 2019. The consumer market is equivalent to $61 billion in 2019. An important indicator is the average commercial loan interest rate, which directs short-term investment and stimulates long-term investment in the economy. It is currently 8.30%, as of June 2021.

The Dominican Republic's most important trading partner is the United States (over 40% of total commercial exchange; over $12 billion in trade). Other major trade partners are China (over $3 billion in trade), Switzerland (over $1 billion), Puerto Rico (over $800 million), Mexico (over $700 million), Haiti (over $700 million), Spain (over $700 million), the Netherlands (over $700 million), Canada (over $600 million), Brazil (over $500 million), and Germany (over $500 million), in that quantitative order.

The country exports free-trade-zone manufactured products (medical devices, electrical equipment, pharmaceuticals, and chemicals), gold, nickel, agricultural products, liquor, cocoa beans, silver, and sauces and seasonings. It imports petroleum, industrial raw materials, capital goods, and foodstuffs. On 5 September 2005, the Congress of the Dominican Republic ratified a free trade agreement with the U.S. and five Central American countries, the Dominican Republic – Central America Free Trade Agreement (CAFTA-DR). CAFTA-DR entered into force for the Dominican Republic on 1 March 2007. The total stock of U.S. foreign direct investment (FDI) in Dominican Republic as of 2019 was US$42 billion, much of it directed to the energy, tourism, real estate, manufacturing, infrastructure and the telecommunications sectors. In 2019 the foreign direct investment stock amounted to $42 billion a significant growth in the last decade and a half. In 2020, during the COVID-19 pandemic, foreign direct investment flows in the Dominican Republic had remained strong at $2.5 billion added to the stock in that year. Having grown to an estimated $44.5 billion, and growing more than ten-fold since 2006 when the liberalization efforts began.

An important aspect of the Dominican economy is the Free Trade Zone industry (FTZ), which made up US$6.2 billion in Dominican exports for 2019. Reports show, however, that the FTZs lost approximately 60,000 between 2005 and 2007 and suffered a 4% decrease in total exports in 2006. The textiles sector experienced an approximate 17% drop in exports in 2006 due in part to the appreciation of the Dominican peso against the dollar, Asian competition following expiration of the quotas of the Multi-Fiber Arrangement, and a government-mandated increase in salaries, which should have occurred in 2005 but was postponed to January 2006. Lost Dominican business was captured by firms in Central America and Asia. The tobacco, jewelry, medical, and pharmaceutical sectors in the FTZs all reported increases for 2006, which offset textile and garment losses. Industry experts from the FTZs expected that entry into force of the CAFTA-DR agreement would promote substantial growth in the FTZ sector in 2007. By the end of the last decade-and-a-half, the free-trade-zone sector has rebounded and surpassed the former amounts of $4.5 billion in 2006 to grow to $6.2 billion by 2019.

== Primary Industries ==
=== Agriculture ===
In 2018, the Dominican Republic produced 644 thousand tons of avocado (it is the second largest producer in the world), 1 million tons of papaya (it is the fourth largest producer in the world), 5.2 million tons of sugarcane, 2.1 million tons of banana, 85 thousand tons of cocoa, 442 thousand tons of palm oil, 407 thousand tons of pineapple, 403 thousand tons of coconut, 627 thousand tons of rice, 160 thousand tons of cassava, 136 thousand tons of orange, in addition to from smaller productions of other agricultural products such as potato, lemon, melon, onion and yam.

With almost 80% of the total land area suitable for crop production and about 17% of the labor force engaged in farming, agriculture remains the primary occupation, accounting for 11% of GDP in 2001. Value of agricultural output grew at an average annual rate of 7.1% during 1968–73, but since 1975 the sector has been hampered by droughts (1975, 1977, and 1979), hurricanes (in 1979 and 1980), and slumping world prices and quota allocations for sugar (since 1985). In 1999, agricultural production was 0.4% higher than during 1989–91. The fertile Cibao Valley is the main agricultural center. In 1998, arable land totaled 1,020,000 hectares (2,500,000 acres); with land under permanent crops at 480,000 hectares (1,200,000 acres).

After Cuba, the Dominican Republic is the second-largest Caribbean producer of sugarcane, the nation's most important crop. The State Sugar Council operates 12 sugar mills and accounts for about half of total production in Batey. Other large producers are the privately owned Vicini, with three mills, and Central Romana Corporation, whose mill is the largest in the country. Sugar is grown in the southeastern plains, around Barahona and on the North Coast Plain. In 1999, sugar production was 4.4 million tons, down from an average of 7.1 million tons during 1989–1991. Output of sugar has declined annually since 1982, and land is gradually being taken out of sugar production and switched to food crops. Production of raw sugar rose from 636,000 tons in 1990 to 813,000 tons in 1997 but fell to 374,000 tons in 1999.

Part of the crop was destroyed by hurricanes in 1979 and 1980, and 1979–80 production was only 670,000 bags (40,200 tons). Although production was usually about 57,000–59,000 tons annually in the 1980s, the acreage harvested declined from 157,000 hectares (390,000 acres) in the early 1980s to 139,000 hectares (340,000 acres) in 1999, indicating a greater yield per acre. Coffee production in 1999 was estimated at 35,000 tons; exports of coffee in 2001 generated $11 million. Cocoa and tobacco are also grown for export. Dominican Republic is one of the top 10 major producers and exporters of cocoa in the world. Cocoa is also grown in the Cibao Valley around San Francisco de Macoris. Tobacco is also grown in the Cibao Valley, but around Santiago. In 1999, production of cocoa beans was 26,000 tons and of tobacco, 35,000 tons. Rice is grown around Monte Cristi and San Francisco de Macoris. Banana production in 1999 was 432,000 tons. Production of other crops in 1999 (in thousands of tons) included rice, 563; coconuts, 184; cassava, 127; tomatoes, 281; pulses, 69; dry beans, 26; eggplants, 7; and peanuts, 2.

=== Livestock farming ===
In 2001, Dominican livestock included 187,000 goats and 106,000 sheep. There were also about 2.1 million head of cattle, 60% for beef and 40% for dairy. The hog population was decimated by African swine fever in 1978, decreasing from 400,000 in 1978 to 20,000 in 1979; by 2001, however, it was 565,000. Poultry is the main meat source because it is cheaper than beef or pork. Poultry production relies on imports of feed grain from the United States. In 2001, 203,000 tons of poultry meat were produced, along with 71,000 tons of beef and 420,000 tons of milk.

=== Fishing ===
In 2017 the total marine production was 18,000 metric tons. Marlin, barracuda, kingfish, mackerel, tuna, sailfish, and tarpon are found in the Monte Cristi Bank and Samaná Bay, which also supports bonito, snapper, and American grouper.

=== Forestry ===
About 28.4% of the total land area consisted of forests and woodlands in 2000. Round wood production in 2000 totaled 562,000 cu m (19.8 million cu ft). Timber is cut for land clearing for the use of agriculture. There are important national parks protecting the natural resources and aquifers of the country.

=== Mining ===
In 2019, the country was the ninth largest world producer of nickel. The country had almost zero production of gold until 2011, when it grew exponentially. In 2016 the country produced almost 38 tons. The country had almost zero production of silver until 2008, when it grew exponentially. In 2017 the country produced 147 tons.

Ferronickel was the country's leading export commodity and third-leading industry. Nickel is mined at Bonao. In 2000, nickel production was 39,943 tons, ranking tenth in the world, a decrease from 49,152 in 1997. Currently the most important mineral export is gold.

Production of gold in the Pueblo Viejo mine is the largest gold producing mine in Latin America and fourth most productive mine in the world producing a total of 30,100 kg of gold in 2018. The extraction by a foreign company of gold at one of the largest mines in the Western Hemisphere has startled and concerned a part of the country who believe that the natural resource should be extracted by local companies and not foreign. Some groups began to protest against Barrick Gold in 2009 and 2010. In 2019 gold is one of the largest exports of the country totaling $1.6 billion and has helped to balance the commodity current account balance.

Production of bauxite, traditionally the principal mining product, ceased in 1992. The Aluminum Co. of America (Alcoa) mined bauxite between 1959 and 1983, when it turned its concession over to the state. Production in 1991 dropped 92% from the previous year, as a presidential decree suspended mining operations at the largest mine, in response to increasing fears of deforestation, although reforestation of mined areas was in progress. Output averaged 1 million tons each year.

The country was one of the few sources of blue amber in the Western Hemisphere. Salt Mountain, a 16 km block of almost solid salt west of Barahona, was the world's largest known salt deposit. There were also large deposits of gypsum near Salt Mountain, making the Dominican Republic one of three sources of gypsum in the Caribbean. The country also produced hydraulic cement, limestone, marble, and sand and gravel. Substantial lignite deposits were found in the early 1980s. Deposits of copper and platinum are also found in the country.

== Secondary Industries ==
The industrial sector contributed an estimated 31.1% to the country's GDP in 2023, led by mining and the manufacture of goods for export to the United States, Europe and Asia. To a lesser extent, there is the manufacturing of food products, consumer non-durables, and building materials for the local market. The sector employed 20.8% of the workforce in 2014.

About 500 companies in the Dominican Republic manufacture goods primarily for the North American market. Situated in 50 industrial free zones around the country, these mostly foreign-owned corporations take advantage of generous tax and other financial inducements offered by the government to businesses that operate within the zones. Approximately 200,000 people, or about 8% of the workforce, are employed in this sector. They mostly produce clothing, electronic components, footwear, and leather goods, which are assembled. The raw materials or semi-manufactured goods are usually imported duty-free from other emerging markets (electronic parts are imported from industrialized Puerto Rico) and assembled in the free trade zones. Products include cosmetics, pharmaceuticals, textiles, perfumes & foodstuffs. The value of free-trade-zone exports amounted to US$6.2 billion in 2019, while their imports of intermediate products amounted to US$4 billion.

Other, more traditional manufacturing is based on sugar refining, cement, iron and steel production, and food processing. Rum is a significant export commodity, and beer and cigarettes are manufactured for local consumption. Most industry of this sort is located around the working-class perimeter of Santo Domingo and other large towns. Metaldom is the main steel manufacturer in the country, with production of 1 million tons per year, most of which is exported. Reid & Compania engaged in the distribution of brands in the automotive and heavy equipment industries in the Dominican Republic such as Jeep, Chrysler, Dodge, RAM, Maserati, Komatsu, Wanco, among others.

== Tertiary Industries ==
Services were estimated to contribute 56% of the GDP in 2023 and employs 64.7% of the population.

=== Education ===
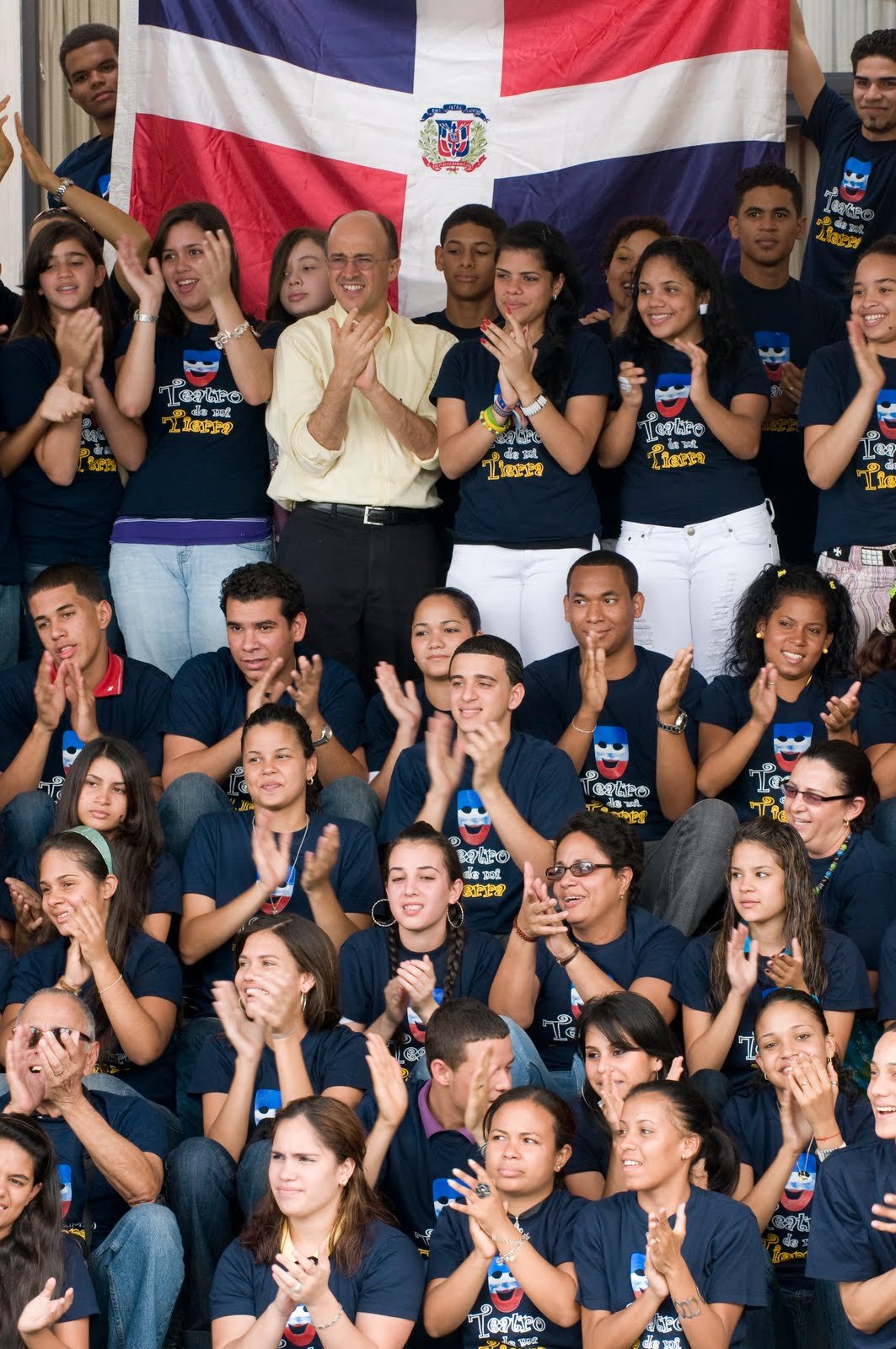
Dominican Republic students with flag in Santiago de los Caballeros.

In the Dominican Republic, education is free and compulsory at the elementary level, and free but non-mandatory at the secondary level. It is divided into four stages:

- preschool education (Nivel Inicial);
- primary education (Nivel Básico);
- secondary education (Nivel Medio);
- higher education (Nivel Superior).

Literacy rates and school participation in the Dominican Republic has risen over the past years. Through these efforts, women have reported fast upward movement in social class partially due to increased education. There have been numerous efforts to evaluate teachers, students, and facilities through examinations. Teachers in the Dominican Republic rate higher in multiple aspects than other countries in Latin America, however, still rank below many other countries.

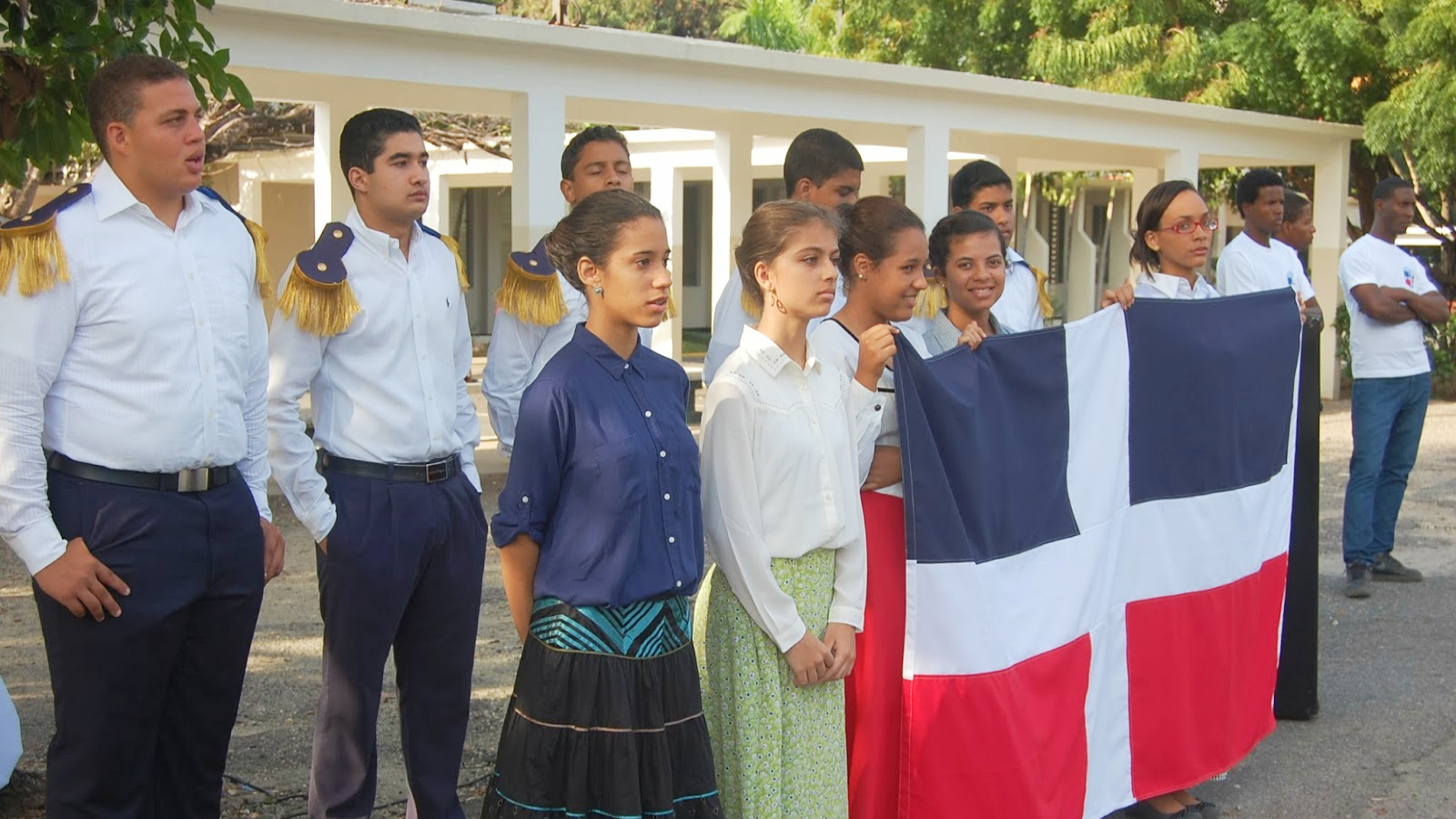
Dominican Republic students

The school conditions vary based on whether the school is private, polytechnic, or public non-polytechnic, with decreasing quality facilities respectively. A very similar trend has been found in student performance. Despite advances in the education system, there are still issues in regards to gender inequality, participation in the education system, and involvement of outside organizations.

The Human Rights Measurement Initiative (HRMI) finds that the Dominican Republic is fulfilling only 75.5% of what it should be fulfilling for the right to education based on the country's level of income. HRMI breaks down the right to education by looking at the rights to both primary education and secondary education. While taking into consideration the Dominican Republic's income level, the nation is achieving 79.8% of what should be possible based on its resources (income) for primary education but only 71.3% for secondary education.

=== Healthcare ===
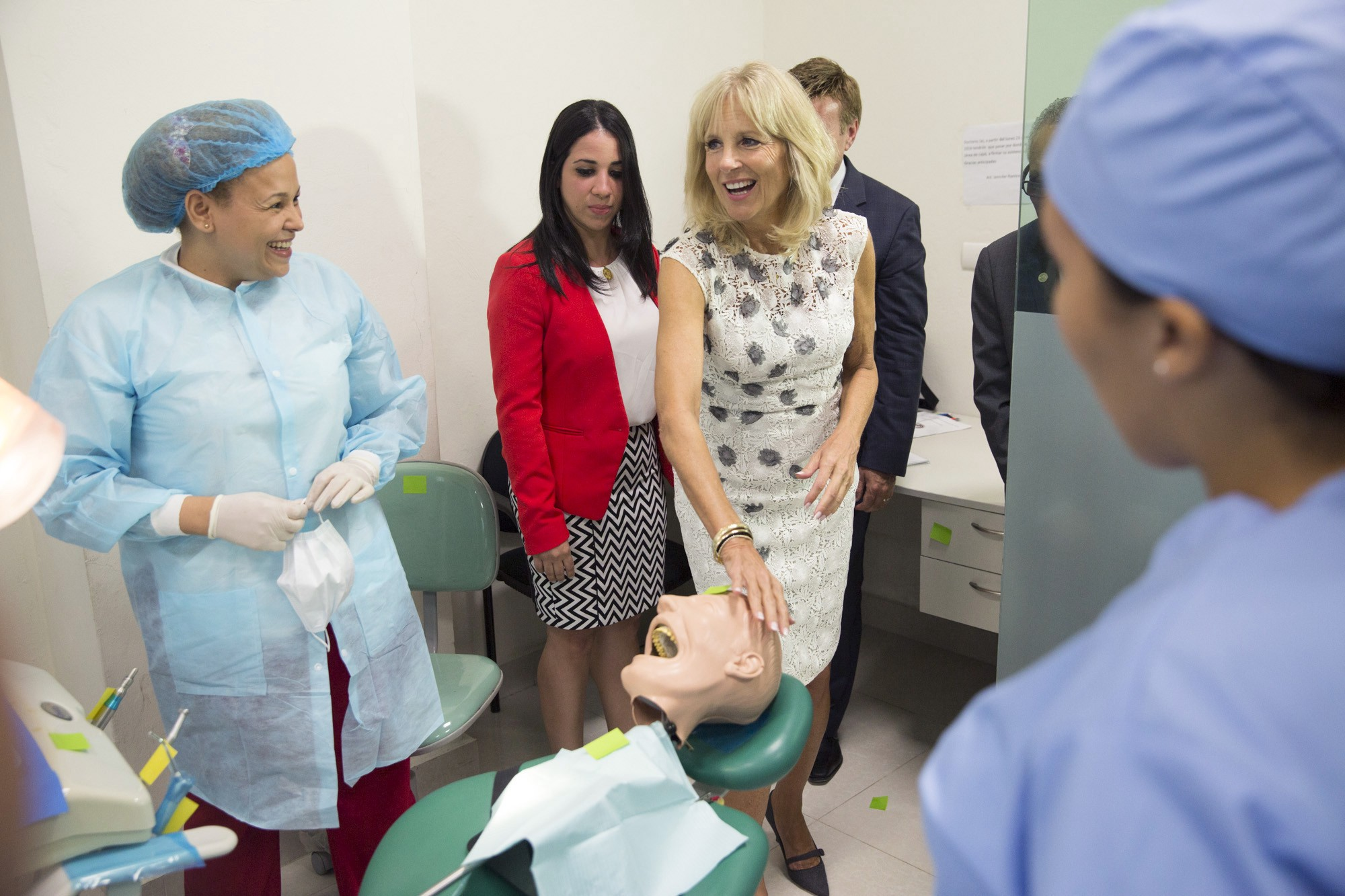
Dominican Republic medical students receive visit from Jill Biden.

Health is the state of overall emotional and bodily wellbeing. Healthcare exists to provide healthiness to people and maintain their ideal conditions. In the Dominican Republic, health haphazardness has resulted in economic disgrace. It was because of the rising of infectious health disparities. Healthcare institutions work extensively toward understanding contagious diseases that influence the Dominican economy.

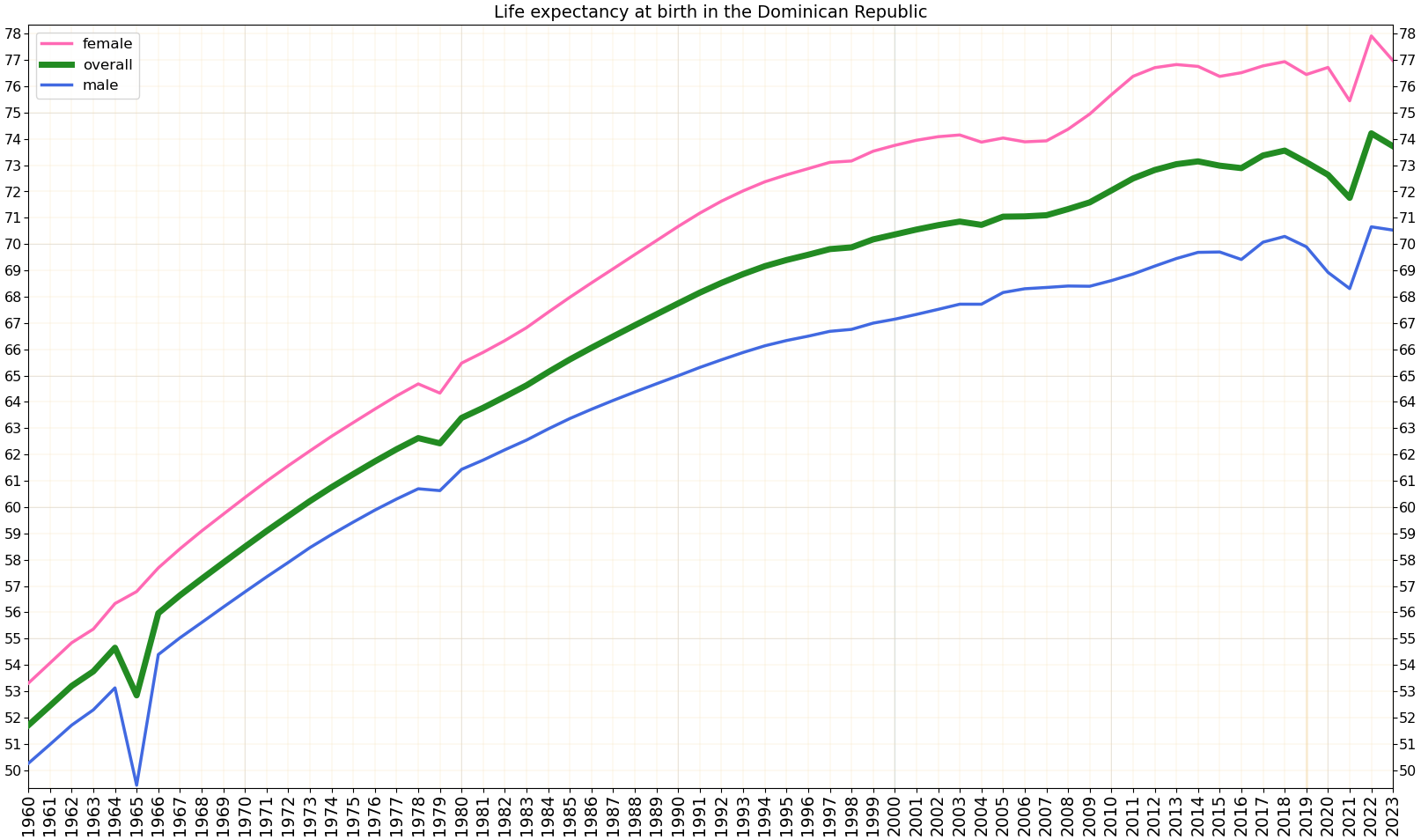
Life expectancy in the Dominican Republic

Life expectancy in the Dominican Republic was 71 years for men and 77 years for women in 2016.

In 2007 the Dominican Republic had a birth rate of 22.91 per 1000 and a death rate of 5.32 per 1000. Youth in the Dominican Republic is the healthiest age group.

The Human Rights Measurement Initiative finds that the Dominican Republic is fulfilling 86.0% of what it should be fulfilling for the right to health based on its level of income. When looking at the right to health with respect to children, the Dominican Republic achieves 89.3% of what is expected based on its current income. In regards to the right to health amongst the adult population, the country achieves only 84.6% of what is expected based on the nation's level of income. The Dominican Republic falls into the "bad" category when evaluating the right to reproductive health because the nation is fulfilling only 84.0% of what the nation is expected to achieve based on the resources (income) it has available.

=== Retail ===
Retail activity in the Dominican Republic takes many forms, from U.S.-style supermarkets and shopping malls in Santo Domingo to rural markets and tiny family-run corner stores in villages. A small but affluent middle class can afford to shop at the former, while the lower-income rural community resorts to buying small amounts of daily essentials from general stores (these small stores often double as pubs). In an attempt to regulate the retail sector, the government has recently reformed taxation laws, so that small shops pay taxes on a regular monthly basis. Many transactions, however, go unrecorded.

Plaza Lama is one of the main department store and supermarket chains of the Dominican Republic.

=== Telecommunications ===
CODETEL telephone network covers, installed in 1991 and 1993

Telecommunications in the Dominican Republic include radio, television, fixed and mobile telephones, and the Internet.

Numerous television channels are available. Tricom, S.A, WIND Telecom, S.A., Viva (network operator), and Claro Codetel provide television services digitally, with channels from Latin America and elsewhere in the world. There are extensive mobile phone and land-line services. Internet access is available as Cable Internet, ADSL, WiMAX, EDGE, EV-DO and UMTS/HSDPA in most parts of the country. Projects to extend Wi-Fi (wireless internet) hot spots have been undertaken in Santo Domingo. Since 2015 the country has been actively extending its fiber optics network, to provide faster and more reliable internet to business and private users.

The Instituto Dominicano De Telecomunicaciones (INDOTEL) regulates and supervises the development of the country's telecommunications market.

=== Tourism ===
Since the mid-1980s the tourism sector has become one of the country's most important sources of foreign exchange, and more popular tourist destinations. The country is famous for its favorable location in the Caribbean, tropical climate, beaches, and the restored Spanish colonial architecture. Many foreign investors have and continue to be encouraged to invest here to build and expand resorts and airports around the coasts. During this same period, tourism displaced sugar as the main source of the country's earnings, and by 1997 it was generating more than half of the country's total foreign exchange. In 2019 it generated one-third of the total foreign exchange for the country.

Tourism is the single biggest revenue earner, growing from humble beginnings in 1980 to more than $7.4 billion by 2019. Successive governments have invested heavily in tourism development, creating upgraded airports and other infrastructure. The number of tourist amounted to 6.4 million tourists arriving in the country in 2019. Most come from Europe, with about 25% originating from the United States or Canada. The country now has almost 70,000 hotel rooms, more than any other Caribbean country. About 50,000 Dominicans are directly employed in this sector, mostly working in hotels, and another 110,000 are indirectly employed as taxi drivers, tour guides, or tourist-shop staff. Most tourists visit the Dominican Republic on account of its beaches, but there is an expanding eco-tourism and outdoor activity sector, focused on the country's mountains and wildlife.

Although tourism generates large revenues, some scholars and activists argue that the development of tourism also has high impacts on many socioeconomic aspects. For instance, they argue that it involves ecological deterioration, profit leakage, social displacement, disported cultural patterns, rising land values, drugs and prostitution. As well, there is a concern by many about tourism effects on the local environment. Tourism takes a disproportionate amount of energy and produces a disproportion amount of waste both about 40%

Travel and tourism contribution to GDP [%]	2001	2008
Dominican Republic	19.2%	17.6%
Caribbean region	18.2%	19.5%

== Infrastructure ==
=== Energy ===
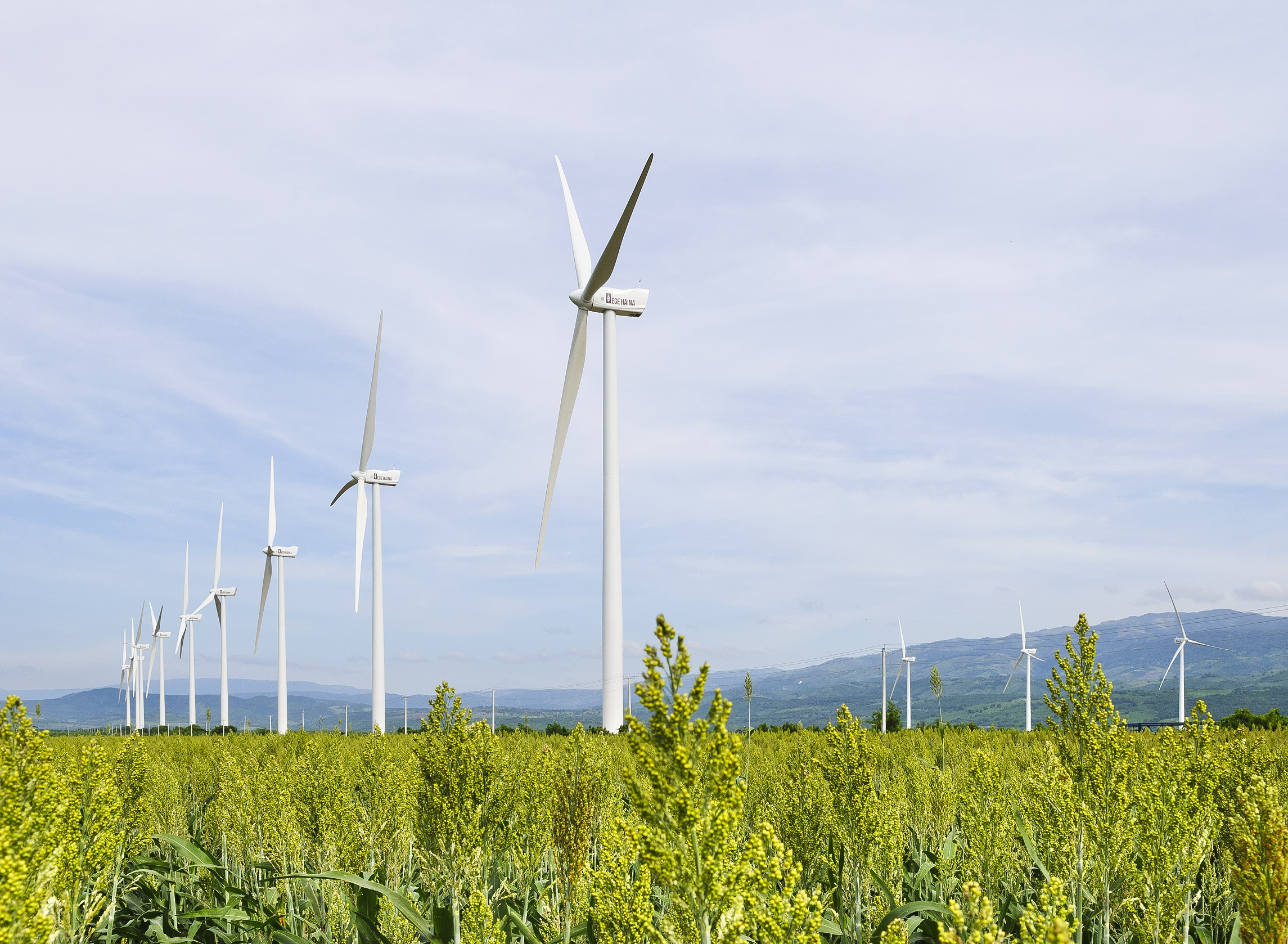
Wind energy in Pedernales province

The electricity sector has had big investments in the last decade 2010 to 2020 diversifying the sector away from petroleum which decreased from 50% of energy generation to 7%. The largest generation sources as of 2021 are coal, natural gas and renewables representing together 93% of electricity generation. This has transformed a strategic sector of the economy into a stable and lower cost sector. The rate of electricity loss improved from 38% in 2005 to 30% in 2019 showing improvement in the infrastructure. Low collection rates, illegal connections, infrastructure problems and poor governance are the sources of the high level of electricity loss in the system. The government plans to continue providing subsidies. Congress passed a law in 2007 that criminalizes the act of illegal electric connections. The state subsidizes the cost of electricity, funding the cost via indirect taxation instead of direct price increases for lower-income households, therefore it is a redistributive policy and partly funded by the country as a whole instead of the direct consumers of electricity. The profit from renewables, natural gas, and coal is positive and considered the current and future of the system, given that petroleum derivatives are considered more volatile and expensive in running costs.

As of 2020 significant investments in the electricity sector have been realized with the construction of the Punta Catalina coal-fired plant. Significantly diversifying the electric sector's away from the traditional mix to one with lower cost. The growth of the renewables sector and the natural gas power sector has made significant strides in this respect in the last few years, and is expected to continue to grow with foreign and local investment in the sector.

=== Transport ===
Transport in the Dominican Republic utilizes a system of roads, airports, ports, harbours, and an urban railway.

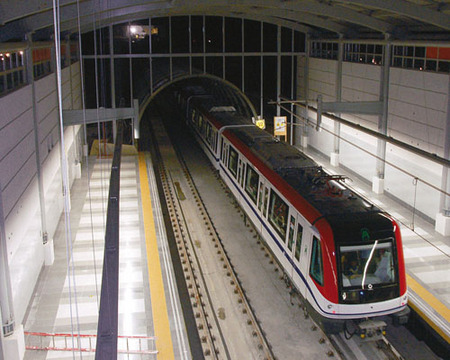
Dominican Republic transportation, Santo Domingo city metro pictured in 2008

=== Water supply and sanitation ===
The Dominican Republic has achieved impressive increases in access to water supply and sanitation over the two decades prior to 2010. However, the quality of water supply and sanitation services remains poor, despite the country's high economic growth during the 1990s.

== Employment ==
Labor participation has improved over the last decade from 62.4% to 67.3%. Despite this growth, female labor participation rates lag more than 25 percentage points behind male labor participation rates, 52.7% and 77.9% respectively. Marginal real wage growth since the end of the 1990s suggests low quality jobs and low bargaining power of employees,.

=== Informal Employment ===
In 2021, 45.5% of Dominicans lived in households where all workers were employed through informal jobs. In rural areas informal employment was 69.1%, compared to 56.9% in urban areas.

== Macroeconomic indicators ==
The following table shows the main economic indicators in 1980–2024 (with IMF staff estimates in 2025–2029). Inflation below 5% is in green.

Year	GDP (in Bil. US$ PPP)	GDP per capita (in US$ PPP)	GDP (in Bil. US$ nominal)	GDP per capita (in US$ nominal)	GDP growth (real)	Inflation rate (%)	Unemployment (%)	Government debt (in % of GDP)
1980	13.7	2,429.3	8.7	1,534.3	▲8.0%	▲21.7%	n/a	n/a
1981	▲15.7	▲2,710.8	▲9.7	▲1,677.4	▲4.3%	▲7.5%	n/a	n/a
1982	▲16.9	▲2,860.5	▼9.1	▼1,545.1	▲1.7%	▲7.6%	n/a	n/a
1983	▲18.4	▲3,038.1	▲9.5	▲1,562.1	▲4.6%	▲5.6%	n/a	n/a
1984	▲19.3	▲3,112.3	▲14.9	▲2,397.6	▲1.3%	▲20.2%	n/a	n/a
1985	▲19.5	▼3,068.1	▼6.5	▼1,022.6	▼-2.1%	▲45.3%	n/a	n/a
1986	▲20.6	▲3,162.4	▲7.9	▲1,212.4	▲3.5%	▲7.6%	n/a	n/a
1987	▲23.2	▲3,482.7	▲8.3	▲1,245.3	▲10.1%	▲13.6%	n/a	n/a
1988	▲24.6	▲3,597.5	▼7.6	▼1,113.8	▲2.2%	▲43.9%	n/a	n/a
1989	▲26.7	▲3,818.6	▲8.6	▲1,230.7	▲4.4%	▲40.7%	n/a	n/a
1990	▼26.1	▼3,672.4	▼8.0	▼1,123.2	▼-5.5%	▲50.5%	n/a	n/a
1991	▲27.3	▲3,766.8	▲9.9	▲1,365.2	▲0.9%	▲47.1%	9.2%	n/a
1992	▲31.0	▲4,207.8	▲11.6	▲1,573.7	▲11.2%	▲4.3%	▲9.5%	n/a
1993	▲34.1	▲4,541.0	▲13.1	▲1,741.7	▲7.4%	▲5.3%	▼9.3%	n/a
1994	▲35.7	▲4,677.0	▲14.6	▲1,916.4	▲2.6%	▲8.3%	▼7.4%	n/a
1995	▲38.6	▲4,962.8	▲16.6	▲2,141.1	▲5.7%	▲12.5%	▼7.3%	n/a
1996	▲41.6	▲5,270.0	▲18.2	▲2,309.9	▲6.0%	▲5.4%	▲7.5%	n/a
1997	▲46.1	▲5,745.7	▲20.0	▲2,495.0	▲8.9%	▲8.3%	▼7.2%	13.8%
1998	▲49.7	▲6,102.4	▲21.7	▲2,658.5	▲6.7%	▲4.8%	▲7.4%	▼13.2%
1999	▲53.4	▲6,457.7	▲22.1	▲2,674.8	▲5.9%	▲6.5%	▼6.3%	▲16.0%
2000	▲57.2	▲6,811.6	▲24.3	▲2,894.3	▲4.7%	▲7.7%	▲8.1%	▲16.7%
2001	▲59.9	▲7,039.8	▲25.6	▲3,007.4	▲2.5%	▲8.9%	▲9.1%	▲20.4%
2002	▲63.6	▲7,371.7	▲27.2	▲3,158.4	▲4.5%	▲5.2%	▼8.5%	▲21.5%
2003	▲64.0	▼7,316.3	▼21.5	▼2,460.6	▼-1.3%	▲27.5%	▲8.7%	▲48.2%
2004	▲67.4	▲7,607.9	▲22.5	▲2,540.8	▲2.6%	▲51.5%	▼7.9%	▼34.3%
2005	▲76.1	▲8,480.4	▲35.9	▲4,008.4	▲9.4%	▲4.2%	▲8.2%	▲38.3%
2006	▲85.6	▲9,435.5	▲38.0	▲4,188.7	▲9.2%	▲7.6%	▼7.1%	▼36.0%
2007	▲94.4	▲10,292.7	▲44.1	▲4,803.5	▲7.4%	▲6.1%	▼6.5%	▼32.9%
2008	▲99.3	▲10,703.6	▲48.2	▲5,194.8	▲3.2%	▲10.6%	▼6.0%	▲33.6%
2009	▲100.9	▲10,757.5	▲48.3	▼5,151.2	▲0.9%	▲1.4%	▲6.8%	▲36.7%
2010	▲110.6	▲11,672.3	▲53.9	▲5,688.8	▲8.3%	▲6.3%	▼6.5%	▲37.3%
2011	▲116.5	▲12,157.9	▲58.1	▲6,063.4	▲3.1%	▲8.5%	▲7.6%	▲39.1%
2012	▲118.2	▲12,207.7	▲60.7	▲6,274.9	▲2.7%	▲3.7%	▲8.4%	▲42.3%
2013	▲125.4	▲12,818.4	▲62.8	▲6,413.9	▲4.9%	▲4.8%	▲9.2%	▲46.7%
2014	▲137.0	▲13,859.1	▲67.3	▲6,805.7	▲7.1%	▲3.0%	▼8.5%	▼44.9%
2015	▲151.6	▲15,186.0	▲71.3	▲7,139.5	▲6.9%	▲0.8%	▼7.3%	▼44.7%
2016	▲167.5	▲16,625.8	▲75.8	▲7,521.3	▲6.7%	▲1.6%	▼7.1%	▲46.6%
2017	▲175.9	▲17,301.4	▲80.1	▲7,874.9	▲4.7%	▲3.3%	▼5.5%	▲48.9%
2018	▲192.7	▲18,772.6	▲85.6	▲8,341.0	▲7.0%	▲3.6%	▲5.7%	▲50.5%
2019	▲205.7	▲19,854.6	▲89.0	▲8,595.2	▲5.1%	▲1.8%	▲6.2%	▲53.6%
2020	▼194.4	▼18,602.9	▼78.9	▼7,553.5	▼-6.7%	▲3.8%	▼5.8%	▲71.5%
2021	▲228.2	▲21,655.0	▲94.5	▲8,962.3	▲12.5%	▲8.2%	▲7.4%	▼63.2%
2022	▲256.2	▲24,096.0	▲113.9	▲10,711.2	▲4.9%	▲8.8%	▼5.3%	▼59.5%
2023	▲271.9	▲25,355.1	▲120.0	▲11,274.2	▲2.4%	▲4.8%	▲6.2%	▲60.9%
2024	▲293.4	▲27,120.4	▲127.4	▲11,773.6	▲5.1%	▲4.01%	▼6.0%	▼59.5%
2025	▲313.3	▲28,715.5	▲136.3	▲12,491.6	▲5.0%	▲4.0%	6.0%	▼58.7%
2026	▲335.3	▲30,466.7	▲145.9	▲13,259.3	▲5.0%	▲4.0%	6.0%	▼57.1%
2027	▲358.9	▲32,325.8	▲156.5	▲14,094.6	▲5.0%	▲4.0%	6.0%	▼55.3%
2028	▲384.1	▲34,298.7	▲167.8	▲14,985.8	▲5.0%	▲4.0%	6.0%	▼53.3%
2029	▲411.2	▲36,399.7	▲179.9	▲15,925.3	▲5.0%	▲4.0%	6.0%	▼51.3%

== Other statistics ==
Exports of the Dominican Republic by product category (2019) Chemical products Transportation Machines Mineral products Plastics and rubbers Metals Foodstuffs Precious metals Textiles Instruments Animal products Vegetable products Paper goods Footwear and headwear Miscellaneous Stone and glass Wood products Animal and vegetable bi-products Animal hides Arts and antiques Weapons

GDP: purchasing power parity – $293.365 billion (2024 est.)

GDP – real growth rate: 5.4% (2024 est.)

GDP – per capita: purchasing power parity – $27,120 (2024 est.)

GDP – composition by sector: agriculture: 5.5% industry: 33.8% services: 60.8% (2017 est.)

Inflation rate (consumer prices): 4.2% (2024 est.)

Labor force: 5.278 million (2022 est.)

Labor force – by occupation: agriculture: 14.4% industry: 20.8% services: 64.7% (2014 est.)

Unemployment rate: 6.0% (2024 est.)

Population below poverty line: 23.9% (2021 est.)

Budget: revenues: $14.10 billion

expenditures: $16.60 billion (2021 est.)

Industries: tourism, sugar processing, ferronickel and gold mining, textiles, cement, tobacco, electrical components, medical devices

Electricity – production: 15.53 billion kWh (2015)

Electricity – consumption: 13.25 billion kWh (2015)

Electricity – exports: 0 kWh (2005)

Electricity – imports: 0 kWh (2005)

Oil – production: 0 bbl/d (0 m^{3}/d) (2014)

Oil – consumption: 122,300 bbl/d (19,440 m^{3}/d) (2012 est.)

Oil – exports: 0 bbl/d (0 m^{3}/d) (2017)

Oil – imports: 116,700 bbl/d (18,550 m^{3}/d) (2017)

Oil – proved reserves: 0 bbl (0 m^{3}) (1 January 2006 est.)

Natural gas – production: 0 cu m (2005 est.)

Natural gas – consumption: 1.108 million cu m (2015 est).

Natural gas – exports: 0 cu m (2005 est.)

Natural gas – imports: 1.108 million cu m (2015)

Natural gas – proved reserves: 0 cu m (1 January 2006 est.)

Agriculture – products: sugarcane, coffee, cotton, cocoa, tobacco, rice, beans, potatoes, corn, bananas; cattle, pigs, dairy products, beef, eggs

Exports: $10.33 billion f.o.b. (2017 est.)

Exports – commodities: ferro nickel, sugar, gold, silver, coffee, cocoa, tobacco, meats, consumer goods

Exports – partners: United States 50.4%, United Kingdom 3.2%, Belgium 2.4% (2017)

Imports: $19 billion f.o.b. (2017 est.)

Imports – commodities: foodstuffs, petroleum, cotton and fabrics, chemicals and pharmaceuticals

Imports – partners: United States 41.4%, China 13.9%, Mexico 4.5%, Brazil 4.3% (2017)

Debt – external: $29.69 billion (31 December 2017 est.)

Economic aid – recipient: $76.99 million (2005)

Currency: Dominican peso (DOP)

Exchange rates: Dominican pesos per US dollar – 33.113 (2007), 33.406 (2006), 30.409 (2005), 42.12 (2004), 30.831 (2003)

Fiscal year: calendar year

== See also ==
- List of companies of the Dominican Republic
- Administrative regions of the Dominican Republic by GDP
- Central Bank of the Dominican Republic
- Corruption in the Dominican Republic
- Dominican Republic and the International Monetary Fund and the World Bank
- Ministry of Economy (Dominican Republic)
- Ministry of Energy and Mines (Dominican Republic)
- Ministry of Finance (Dominican Republic)
- Ministry of Industry and Trade (Dominican Republic)
- Economy of the Caribbean
- List of Latin American and Caribbean countries by GDP growth
- List of Latin American and Caribbean countries by GDP (nominal)
- List of Latin American and Caribbean countries by GDP (PPP)
