= Johannpeter =

Johannpeter is a surname. Notable people with the surname include:

- André Bier Gerdau Johannpeter (born 1963), Brazilian businessman and equestrian
- Jorge Gerdau Johannpeter (born 1936), Brazilian businessman and equestrian

== See also ==
- Asteroid 19970 Johannpeter, named after Johann Peter Hebel (1760–1826)
