= Economy of Porto Alegre =

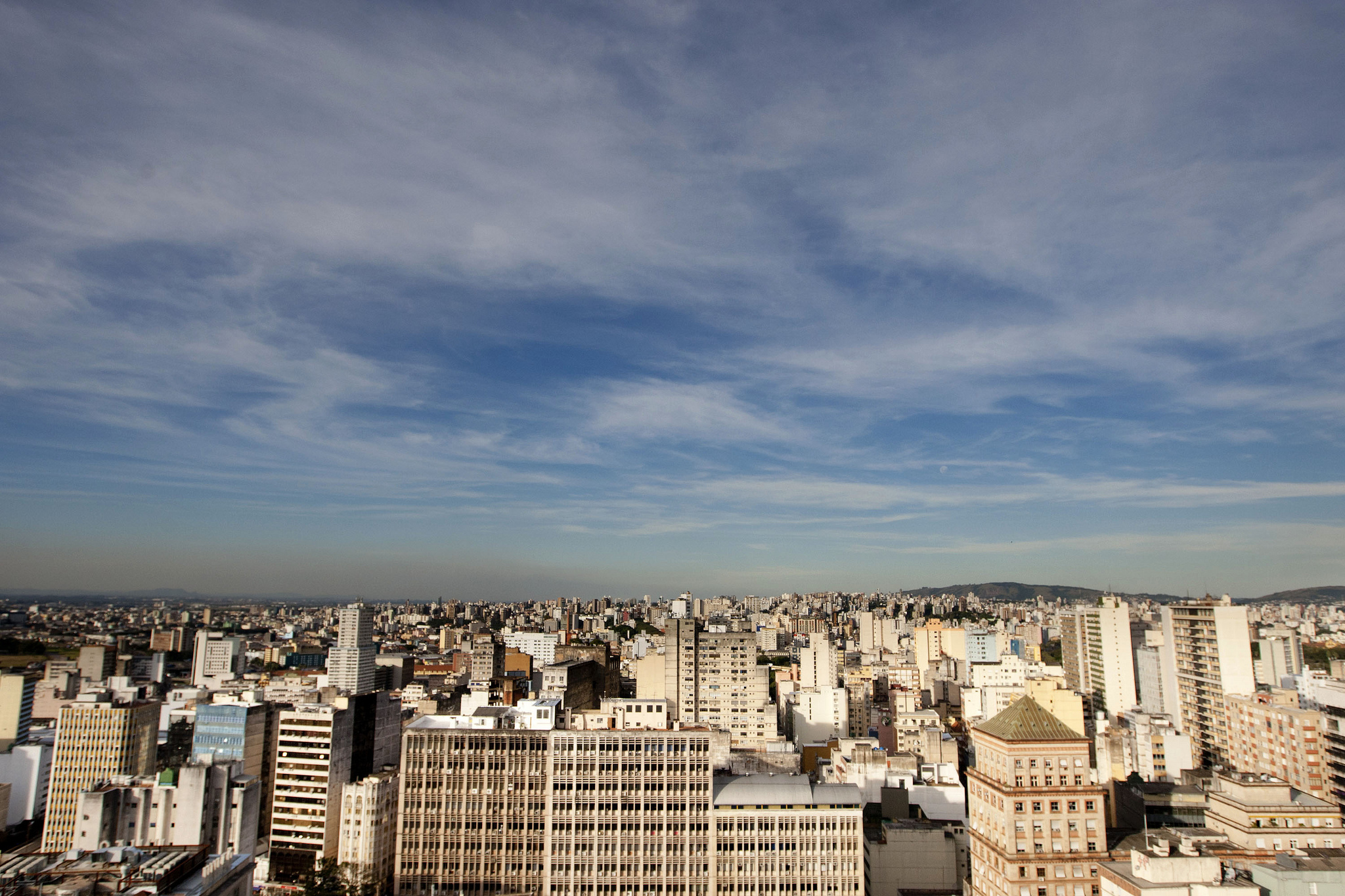
- City of Porto Alegre
- Currency: Brazilian Real
- Fiscal year: Calendar Year

Statistics
- GDP per capita: 49,740,90 R$
- GDP by sector: Service, Industry, Agriculture
- Unemployment: 9.5%
- All values, unless otherwise stated, are in US dollars.

The economy of Porto Alegre is the fastest growing economy in Brazil and is currently the country's 7th largest regional economy. The city of Porto Alegre has a population of approximately 1.4 million people (the countries 12th largest). The history of Porto Alegre, particularly during the industrial revolution established its economy and the basis of the current industrial sector in the city.

Porto Alegre has a gross domestic product (GDP) per capita of $18,770. The main contributors to the economy of Porto Alegre are services, followed by industry and then agriculture. The main features of the service sector include education, health and tourism, as well as computers/technology. In terms of industry features; the economy of Porto Alegre relies on shoe/leather making, petrochemicals and the manufacturing of cars. The importance of the agricultural sector is due to the environment of Porto Alegre being suitable for the production of tobacco and the raising of livestock. The concept of Participatory Budgeting originated in Porto Alegre and the city is a lead exporter for the state of Rio Grande do Sul.

== History ==
Historically, the industrialisation of Brazil was slow and it was not until the 1930s that the south of Brazil became industrialised. Porto Alegre acts as the centre for the industrial sector of the south of Brazil and particularly for Rio Grande do Sul. The city is located on the bank of the Rio Guaiba, through the history of the city, its location at the junction of five rivers has been important in establishing it as a "chief industrial and commercial centre of Brazil."

== Population and location ==
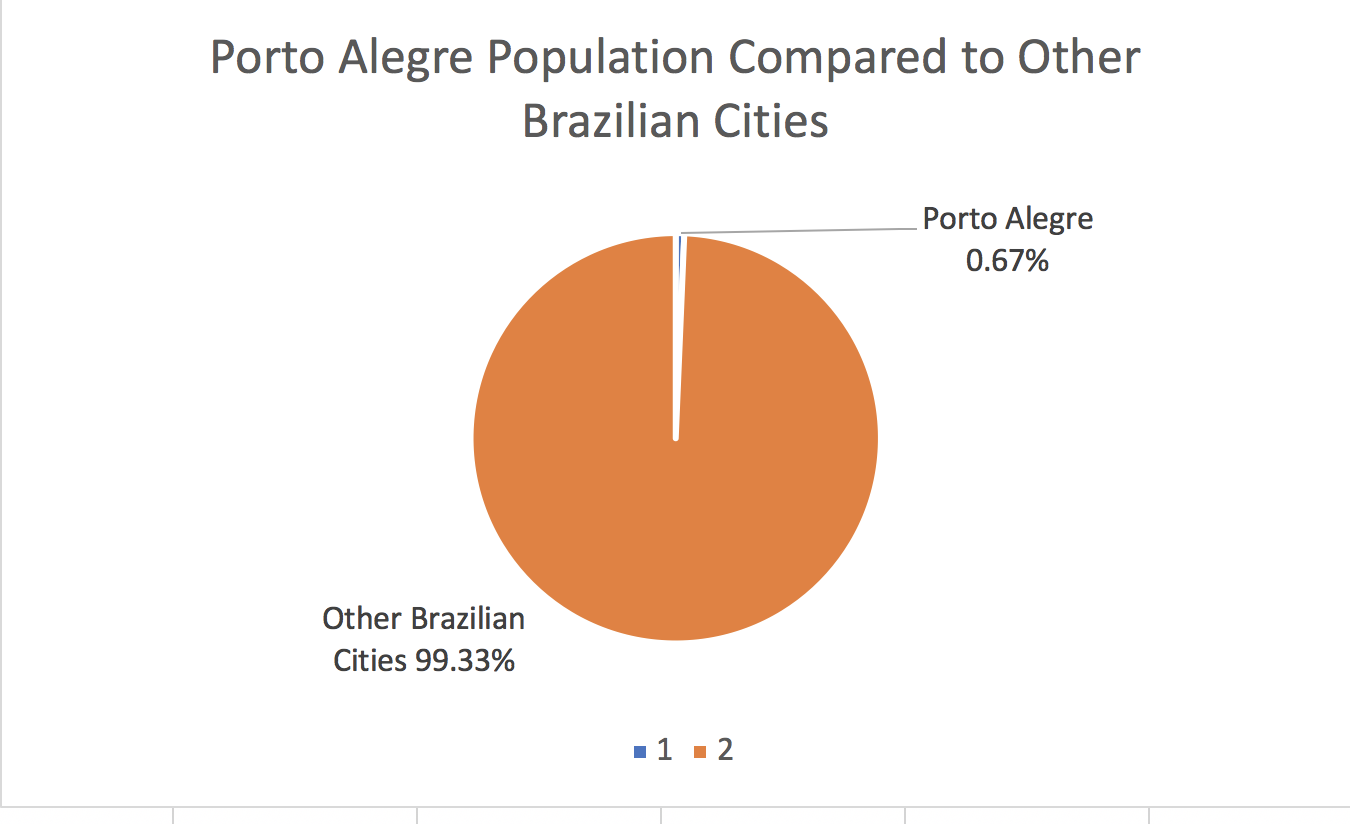
Population of Porto Alegre (Figure 1)

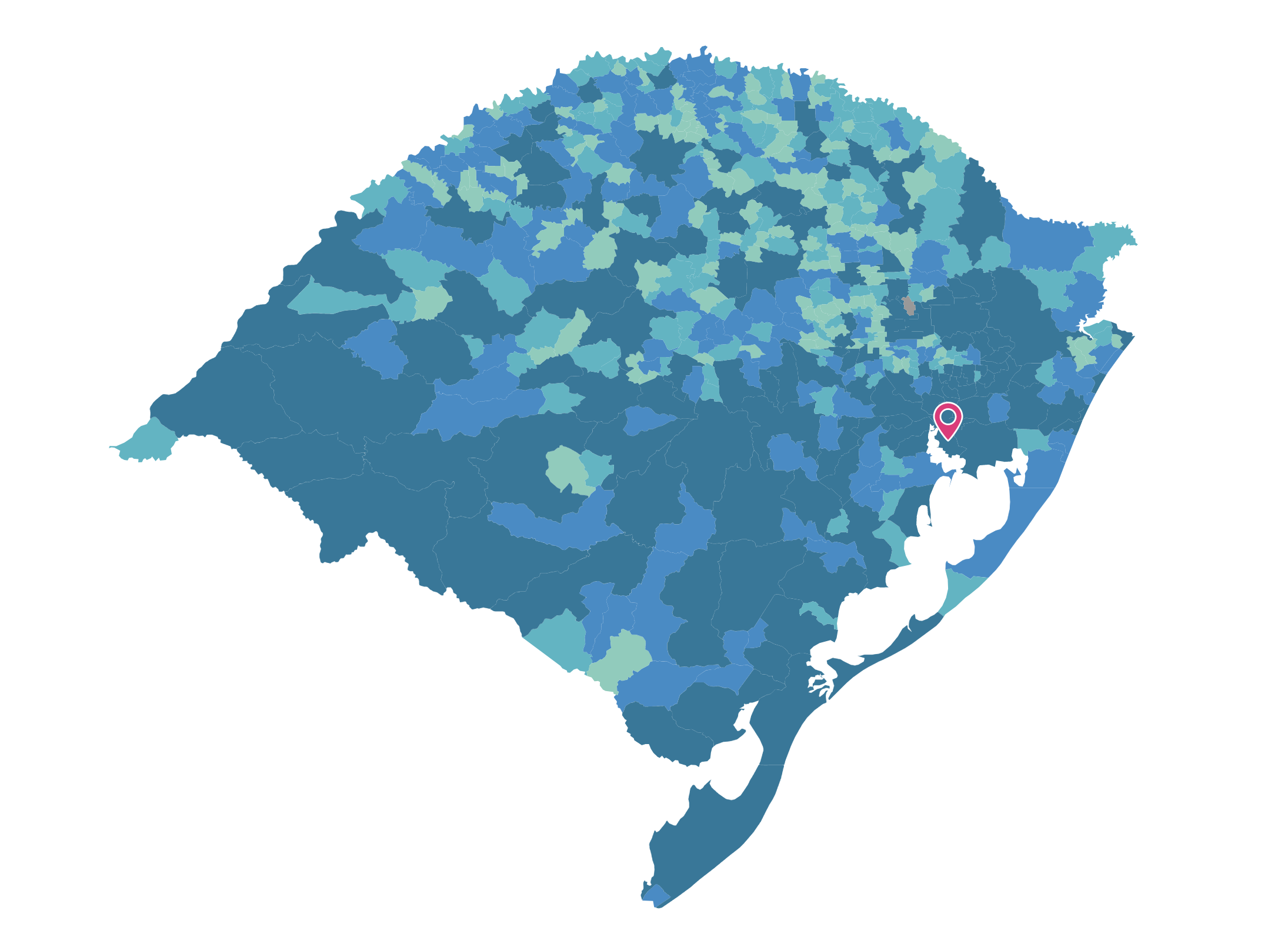
Location of Porto Alegre (figure 2)

The population of Porto Alegre is 1,483,771. As a percentage of the total population of Brazil (210, 147, 125), the people of Porto Alegre make up approximately 0.67% of the population. (As shown in figure 1).

Porto Alegre is the capital city of the southernmost state in Brazil (Rio Grande do Sul). Its location can be seen in figure 2. It is situated next to the freshwater lagoon named the Lagoa dos Patos, this lagoon is the meeting of 5 rivers.

== Gross domestic product (GDP) ==
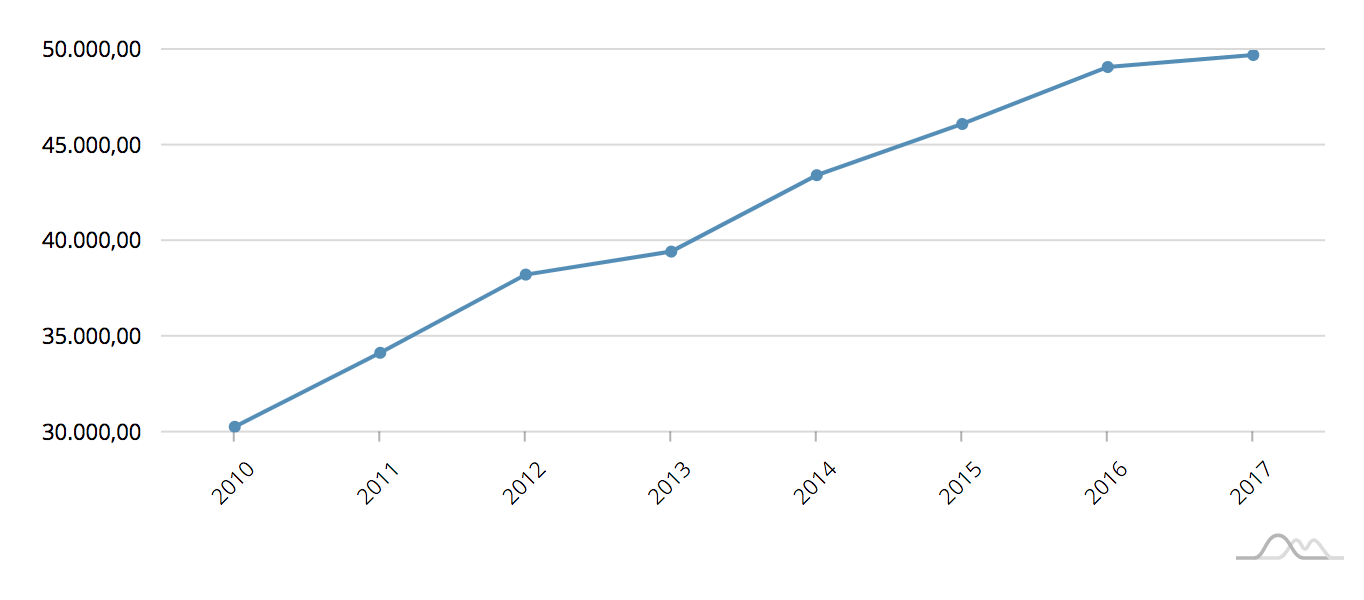
The GDP of Porto Alegre (figure 3)

The GDP per capita of Porto Alegre is R$49,740.90. As shown in the graph below (figure 2), the GDP per capita of Porto Alegre has been steadily increasing since 2010 showing a 65.8% increase. (Calculated from graph).

== Currency ==
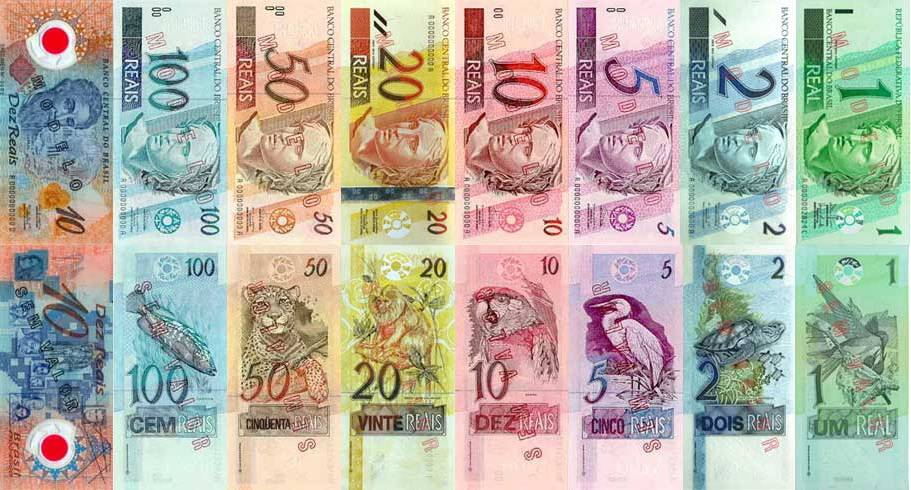
The Brazilian real (figure 4)

The currency used throughout Brazil (hence in Porto Alegre) is the Brazilian real (BRL).

Subunit:

1/100 centavos (i.e. it is 100 centavos per 1 Brazilian real).

Symbol:

The symbol used for denoting a Brazilian real is R$

Shown in figure 4 is the Brazilian real.

== Exports ==
The balance of trade of Rio Grande do Sul (of which Porto Alegre is the top exporter) between 2010 and 2017 was positive (i.e. the state exported more goods than they imported). In 2017 the states balance was US$7.5 billion. The state accounts for roughly 10% of Brazil's total exports; Porto Alegre contributing to at least 20% of this figure. Porto Alegre's major exports include plastics, oil, grains, fruits, meat, vehicle parts, soybeans, leather, and rice. Because of Porto Alegre's location; the cities port has always been a trading and logistics hub as it is a junction for 5 major rivers.

== Employment ==
The unemployment rate of Porto Alegre (2019) is 9.5%, which is 3.04% lower than the employment rate of Brazil. It can be seen in the graph below that since 2002 the unemployment rate of Porto Alegre has been generally decreasing until 2014 when they began to rise again. It can also be noted that no other capital city between 2014 and 2018 decreased their unemployment rates.

== Income ==
The average salary in Porto Alegre is between R$130,000 and R$145,000 yearly ($22825.04 (USD) to $25458.69 (USD)). Individuals working in the public sector earn on average 6% more than those working in the private sector. The average monthly salary has been notably increasing since 2016, averaging a 3% increase up to 2020. The income in Porto Alegre compared to that of Brazil shows that on average the salary is 5% higher in Porto Alegre than Brazil.

== Housing ==
The average price per square metre in Porto Alegre is R$6,390 compared to the average housing cost in Brazil being R$7,431.25 per square metre. The price per square metre is on average 15.1% lower in Porto Alegre than the average price in Brazil.

== Sectors ==
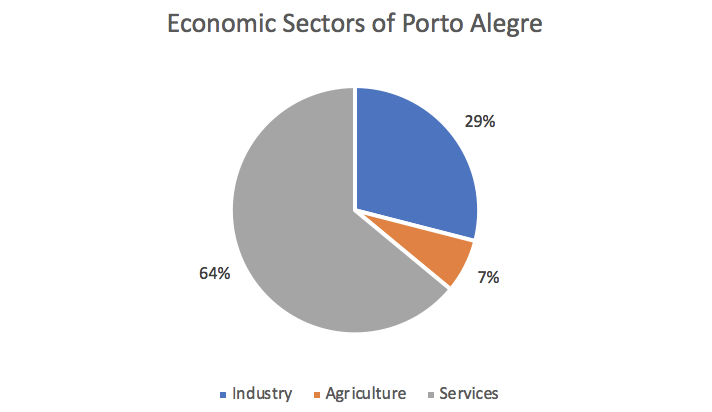
The economic sectors of Porto Alegre (figure 5)

The main sectors of the Economy of Porto Alegre are services, industry and agriculture. These three sectors are essential to the economy of the city. These sectors contributions to the economy are as follows:

=== Service ===
As seen in figure 5 service accounts for 64% of the economy of Porto Alegre. The main services making up this percentage include computers, health, education and tourism.

==== Education ====
Porto Alegre has four universities with over 85,000 total students.

The largest of the four universities is Universidade Federal do Rio Grande do Sul (The Federal University of Rio Grande do Sul), this university is a public university with roughly 27,000 students (2020). The university was established in 1934 making it the oldest university in Porto Alegre.

The Universidade Estadual do Rio Grande do Sul (The Rio Grande do Sul State University) is a public university in Brazil founded in 2001, making it a relatively young university. It was founded in the city of Porto Alegre, and now has multiple campuses across the state of Rio Grande do Sul.

The Universidade Federal de Ciências da Saúde de Porto Alegre (The Federal University of Health Sciences of Porto Alegre) is a Health Sciences university located in Porto Alegre. The university was founded in 1961 and now offers 15 degrees all in the health field.

The Pontifícia Universidade Católica do Rio Grande do Sul (The Pontifical Catholic University of Rio Grande do Sul) is the largest private university in the state, and has one of its two campuses in Porto Alegre (the other in Viamão)

==== Tourism ====
Tourism is another important part of the economy, supporting many jobs in the economy. The city has over 50 museums and memorials, 13 cultural centres and more than 30 theatres and arts centres. The city also has various parks and environmental preservation areas. Attractions include things such as:

- Metropolitan Cathedral

The Metropolitan Cathedral has been recognised as “one of the main symbols of the capital of the state of Rio Grande do Sul.” The cathedral is also known as Nossa Senhora Mãe de Deus Cathedral and is located in the city centre.

- Porto Alegre Public Market

The Porto Alegre Public Market is a public attraction as it is the city's oldest market. It also has historic significance to the city. The public market has many restaurants, cafes and stores nearby.

- Linha Turismo

A tourist bus line, that travels through 11 smaller towns showing the cities major attractions including parks, churches, monuments and landscapes.

- Monumento aos Açorianos (Açorianos monument)

This is a commemorative monument that recognises the first settlers of Porto Alegre (people from the island of Azores). The monument stands at 17m high.

- Santuário Mãe de Deus

This attraction is a traditional church of Porto Alegre. Its popularity is largely due to its location with views of the city and surrounding landscapes.

=== Industry ===
The main industries that contribute to the Economy of Porto Alegre are as follows: shoe/leathermaking, petrochemicals and the manufacturing of cars. The largest companies in the city that contribute to the industry section of the economy are:

- General Motors
- Dell Computers
- Zaffari
- RBS TV
- Ipiranga
- Metalurgica Gerdau

==== General Motors ====
General Motors is a global company and the Brazil sector; General Motors do Brasil, is the largest subsidiary of the General Motors in South America. A significant branch of General Motors operates in Porto Alegre providing numerous jobs to local citizens.

==== Dell Computers ====
Dell Computers Brazil headquarters is located in Rio Grande du Sol (Porto Alegre) where the company provides 700 jobs for locals in the State of Rio Grande do Sul. The headquarters includes Sales, Marketing and Services organizations as well as the GDC-Global Development Centre.

==== Zaffari ====
Zaffari is the 5th largest Brazilian company, the company is a chain supermarket company in Rio Grande du Sol. The headquarters of the company is located in Porto Alegre.

==== RBS TV ====
RBS TV is a television broadcasting station in the State of Rio Grande du Sol established in 1962. The station has a coverage of 98.8% of the state, with over 11.2 million viewers. One of the largest of the 12 broadcasters in the state is located in Porto Alegre.

==== Ipiranga ====
Ipiranga is a subsidiary of Ultragaz. Ipiranga has over 6500 stations and 1400 convenience stores across Brazil, making it the 2nd largest fuel distributor in Brazil and the largest in the private sector. The headquarters of Ipiranga is located in Porto Alegre, hence the company plays a large role in the cities Economy.

==== Metalurgica Gerdau ====
Gerdau is the largest producer of steel in the Latin America, with steel mills is 14 countries including Brazil, America and India. It is also the 14th largest steelmaker in the world. The company is made up of 337 industrial and commercial centres which employ over 45, 000 people. It has its main Brazilian office in Rio Grand du Sol, Porto Alegre.

=== Agriculture ===
The agricultural features of the economy of Porto Alegre include mainly tobacco and livestock. Due to the rich and fertile land surrounding the CBD of Porto Alegre; the city produces large amounts of beef, rice, soybeans, and leather.

== Participatory Budgeting ==
Participatory Budgeting is a democratic decision-making process allowing citizens to allocate the public budget. This concept originated in Porto Alegre, hence has historical significance to the city. Participatory budgeting was established in 1989 under the leadership of Olivio Dutra, this concept is built on 3 principles that are as follows:

1. "All citizens are entitled to participate;
2. Participation is governed by a combination of direct and representative democracy rules and takes place through regularly functioning institutions whose internal rules are decided upon by the participants;
3. Investment resources are allocated according to an objective method based on a combination of 'general criteria' and 'technical criteria'."

These principles are reflective of the democratic nature of this system. 2,700 governments have adopted the practice since the origination of the concept in Porto Alegre.

The benefits of Participatory Budgeting have been seen in many areas where this system is put in place; however, the benefits in the first 10 years of its implementation in Porto Alegre show strong results. Data from a case study by the World Bank shows the following results:

- An increase in public housing units; originally having only 1,700 new residents in 1986 à after the implementation of Participatory budgeting housing an additional 27,000 in 1989.
- Before Participatory Budgeting, only 75% of the households had sewer and water connections, increasing to 98% of total households by 1997.
- The number of has schools in the city by 1986 increased by 300%.
- The budget allocation for health and education increased from 13% to just shy of 40% in the first 10 years of the implementation of Participatory Budgeting.
