= Commercial Metals Company =

Steel and metal manufacturer

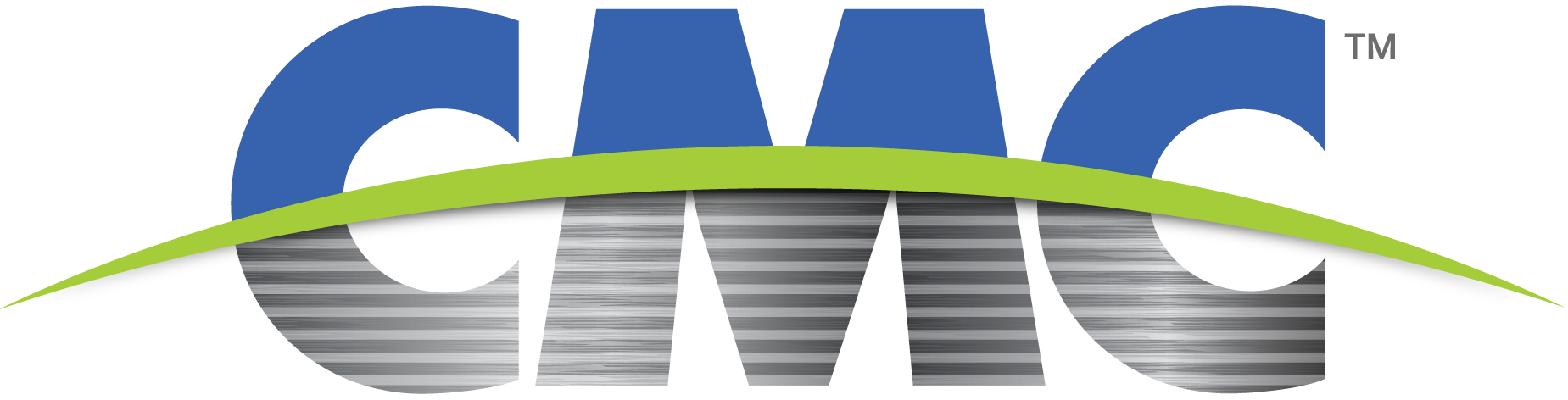
- Logo used since 2023
- Company type: Public
- Traded as: NYSE: CMC; S&P 400 component
- Industry: Metals; Steel
- Founded: 1915; 111 years ago
- Headquarters: Irving, Texas, United States
- Key people: Barbara R. Smith (chairman); Peter R. Matt (president & CEO); Paul J. Lawrence (CFO); Tracy L. Porter (COO)
- Products: Steel
- Revenue: ▼$8.799 billion (FY 2023)
- Net income: ▼$859 million (FY 2023)
- Total assets: ▲$6.639 billion (FY 2023)
- Total equity: ▲$4.120 billion (FY 2023)
- Number of employees: 13,022 (2023)
- Website: www.cmc.com

Commercial Metals Company (CMC) is a company that produces rebar and related construction materials headquartered in Irving, Texas. Along with Nucor, it is one of two primary suppliers of steel used to reinforce concrete in buildings, bridges, roads, and infrastructure in the U.S. The company also owns Tensar, a producer of foundation systems used for the construction of roadways, public infrastructure, and industrial facilities.

CMC operates 212 facilities in the United States and Poland, including electric arc furnace mini-mills, scrap recycling facilities, and steel fabrication plants. In its fiscal 2023 year, it shipped 6.1 million short tons of steel to external customers; 84% of its sales were in the United States and 16% of its sales were from its facilities in Poland.

The company was founded in 1915 by Russian immigrant Jacob Feldman as American Iron & Metal Company, a scrap trading company.

== Acquisitions and divestitures ==
Date	Acquisition / Divestiture	Company	Price	Ref(s).
September 1994	Acquisition	Owen Steel Company	$87 million	
March 2007	Acquisition	Assets of Nicholas J. Bouras Inc.	$63 million	
April 2012	Divestiture	Heavy fabrication plant of SMI-Owen Steel	$20 million	
June 2011	Acquisition	G.A.M. Steel Pty. Ltd of Australia	Undisclosed	
October 2013	Divestiture	Howell Metal Company	$58.5 million	
October 2016	Acquisition	Steel fabrication business of Associated Steel Workers, Limited (steel fabrication facility in Kapolei, Hawaii)	Undisclosed	
August 2017	Divestiture	CMC Cometals Division	$179 million	
November 2018	Acquisition	33 rebar manufacturing facilities and 4 EAF mini mills from Gerdau	$600 million	
January 2022	Divestiture	95-acre land parcel in Rancho Cucamonga, California; former site of steel mill acquired from Gerdau	$313 million	
April 2022	Acquisition	Tensar	$550 million	
September 2022	Acquisition	Advanced Steel Recovery	Undisclosed	
November 2022	Acquisition	Galveston area metals recycling facility	Undisclosed	
March 2023	Acquisition	Roane Metals Group LLC	Undisclosed	
July 2023	Acquisition	EDSCO Fasteners LLC	Undisclosed	

== See also ==
- List of steel producers
- History of the Commercial Metals Company
