= Jorge Gerdau Johannpeter =

Brazilian businessman

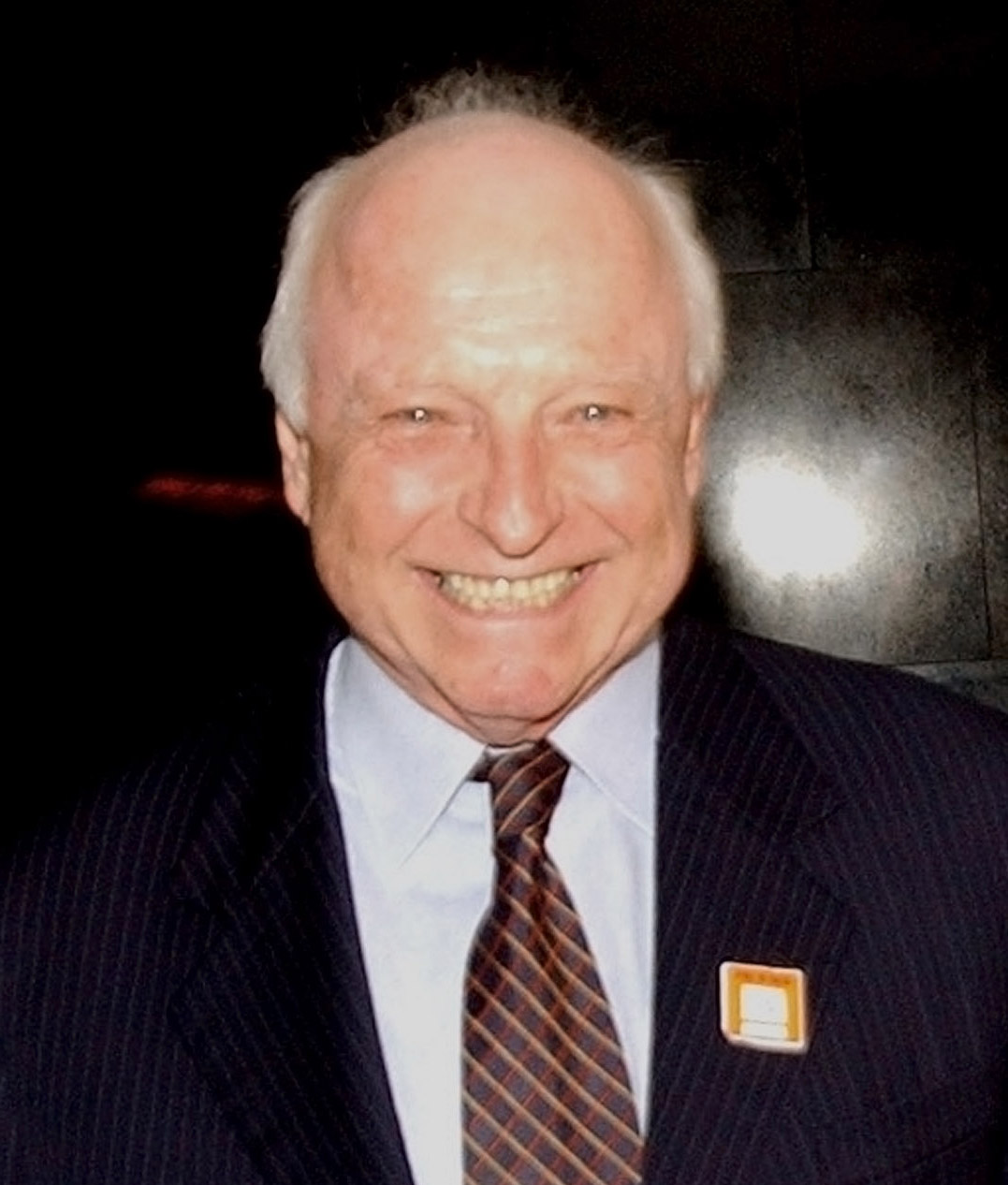
- Jorge Gerdau Johannpeter in 2006
- Born: Jorge Gerdau Johannpeter; December 8, 1936 (age 89); Rio de Janeiro, Brazil
- Education: Universidade Federal do Rio Grande do Sul (1958)
- Children: 5, including André Bier Gerdau Johannpeter

Jorge Gerdau Balbi Johannpeter (born December 8, 1936) is a Brazilian businessman and a former executive of Gerdau.

== Biography ==
=== Early life ===
Jorge Gerdau Johannpeter was born in Rio de Janeiro, Brazil in 1936. He is the great-grandson of João Gerdau, the founder of Gerdau. He earned a bachelor's degree from the Universidade Federal do Rio Grande do Sul in 1958.

=== Career ===
Jorge Gerdau Johannpeter began working at Gerdau at age 16 and was the CEO of Gerdau from 1983 to 2006. He was chairman until 2015.

In 2011, then President of Brazil Dilma Rousseff named Gerdau as president of the Chamber of Management Policies, Performance and Competitiveness (CGDC). He advocated the reduction in the number of ministries, which he considered to be excessive.

=== Awards ===
- Great Cross (National Order of Scientific Merit), 2002
- Juran Medal (American Society for Quality), 2010
- Gold Medal (Americas Society), 2012

== Personal life ==
Gerdau was an equestrian until 2009. He was the owner of the Haras Joter, which in 1996 placed three animals of his creation in the 1996 Summer Olympics.

In 2012, his net worth was estimated to be R$1,87 billion ($926 million).

Gerdau has been married three times: to Érica Bier, Maria Elena Pereira, and to Christina Harbich. He has 5 children. His son André Bier Gerdau Johannpeter won a bronze medal in the competition of show jumping (team).

Gerdau is also an aficionado of surfing, a sport he practiced in Rio Grande do Sul from the early 1960s.

== See also ==
- List of Brazilians by net worth
