= Telecommunications in the Dominican Republic =

CODETEL telephone network covers, installed in 1991 and 1993

Telecommunications in the Dominican Republic include radio, television, fixed and mobile telephones, and the Internet.

Numerous television channels are available. Tricom, S.A, WIND Telecom, S.A., Viva (network operator), and Claro Codetel provide television services digitally, with channels from Latin America and elsewhere in the world. There are extensive mobile phone and land-line services. Internet access is available as Cable Internet, ADSL, WiMAX, EDGE, EV-DO and UMTS/HSDPA in most parts of the country. Projects to extend Wi-Fi (wireless internet) hot spots have been undertaken in Santo Domingo. Since 2015 the country has been actively extending its fiber optics network, to provide faster and more reliable internet to business and private users.

The Instituto Dominicano De Telecomunicaciones (INDOTEL) regulates and supervises the development of the country's telecommunications market.

== Radio and television ==
- Radio stations: AM 146, FM 233, shortwave 14 (2013). A combination of state-owned and privately owned radio stations with more than 300 radio stations operating (2007).
- Radios: 1.44 million (1997).
- Television stations: 46 (2012). A combination of state-owned and privately owned broadcast media; 1 state-owned and a number of private TV networks; networks operate repeaters to extend signals throughout country (2007).
- Pay TV: 49,010 subscribers (2010).
- Television sets: 770,000 (1997).

Cable television in the Dominican Republic is provided by a variety of companies. These companies offer both English and Spanish language television, plus a range of channels in other languages, high definition channels, pay-per-view movies and events, sports packages, premium movies channels and adult channels such as HBO, Playboy TV, Cinecanal, MLB Extra Innings, etc. The channels are not only from the Dominican Republic, but also the United States and Europe.

In the Dominican Republic there are 46 in VHF and UHF channels free-to-air channels. The programming on the free of charge channels consists mainly of locally produced entertainment shows, news, and comedy shows; and foreign sitcoms, soap operas, movies, cartoons, and sports programs.

The main service provider in the Dominican Republic is Tricom. Aster is concentrated in Santo Domingo, but is expanding its service throughout the Dominican Republic. There are new companies using new technologies that are expanding quickly such as Claro TV (IPTV and Satellite TV), Wind Telecom (MMDS) and SKY (Satellite TV).

On election day in May 2012 government broadcast regulators took two popular national television channels (11 and 33) off the air on the grounds that they violated an electoral law prohibiting distribution of exit poll or other unofficial information regarding the final results of the electoral process. Both channels were closed on the afternoon of 20 May and reopened the next morning.

== Telephones ==
- Area codes: 809, 829, and 849.
- International call prefix: +1
- Fixed lines: 1.14 million lines in use, 70th in the world (2022).
- Fixed line teledensity: 10 per 100 people (2011).
- Mobile cellular: 9.0 million lines (2012).
- Mobile cellular teledensity: 90 per 100 people (2011).
- Domestic system: Relatively efficient system based on island-wide microwave radio relay network (2011) and fiber optics lines that cover many of the main cities.
- Communications cables: Landing point for the Americas Region Caribbean Ring System (ARCOS-1), ANTILLAS I, and the Fibralink submarine cables that provide links to South and Central America, parts of the Caribbean, and the US (2011).
- Satellite earth station: 1, Intelsat (Atlantic Ocean) (2011).

== Internet ==
- Top-level domain: .do
- Internet users: 9.35 million users, 62nd in the world; 85.0% of the population (2021).
- Fixed broadband: 446,420 subscriptions, 72nd in the world; 4.4% of the population, 108th in the world (2012).
- Wireless broadband: 1.6 million subscriptions, 65th in the world; 15.4% of the population, 80th in the world (2012).
- Internet hosts: 404,500 hosts, 55th in the world (2012).
- IPv4: 857,600 addresses allocated, less than 0.05% of the world total, 85 addresses per 1000 people (2012).
- Internet service providers (ISPs): 8: Claro (Fiber, ADSL and wireless), Tricom (Fiber, WiMAX, ADSL, and Cable), Aster (CABLE), VIVA (wireless), Orange (wireless), ONEMAX (Fiber GPON, Wireless PTP, Data Center), Wind Telecom (WiMAX) (2008).

=== Broadband Internet access ===
The Dominican Republic is considered one of the countries with the most advanced telecommunications infrastructures in Latin America, with over 8.9 million cell phones connected (on just about 10 million populants, with 3.5 million of them on extreme poverty conditions) and large companies like Codetel and Orange (FR) on the telecommunications market. Broadband Internet access is growing, with over 622,931 Internet accounts globally and 3,851,278 Internet users as of December 2010 according to INDOTEL (DR Telecommunications Institute). Broadband DSL represents about 56% of the total Internet subscribers. There is access to regular ADSL, G.SHDSL, and services only on metropolitan areas, costs are high and service is decent. Cable Internet is offered by a couple of cable companies at lower costs than ADSL but the service is very deficient and unreliable. WiFi is becoming more common. It is available in some universities. Most hotels also offer wi-fi internet. The implementation of the WiMAX and HSPA technology by some of the Cellphone service providers are resulting in the rapid investment by other providers in the market to match the new and faster platform of services. Mobile broadband users have seen their percentage grow from 14% in 2007 all the way to 39% in 2010, and will continue to grow as more and more users are opting for this type of technology in a country where Home Broadband speeds are more expensive and slower. Also the ongoing installation of a Fiber-Optic network structure in the National District and the City of Santiago (second largest in the country) will force other competitors into upgrading theirs to be able to compete in the markets they now lead.

=== Pricing ===
As of October 2018, not including taxes.

Key: DOP: Dominican peso, USD: United States dollar. Exchange rate ( $50 DOP : US$1 )

Pricing – Home Internet Access (By ISP)

The following table shows the speeds/prices* available and designed for home usage.

Download Speeds	Claro Dominican Republic	Altice Dominicana S.A.	Wind Telecom (Dominican Republic)	Viva (network operator)
1 Mbit/s	–	–	$790 DOP (US$15.80)	–
2 Mbit/s	$750 DOP (US$15)	–	$990 DOP (US$19.80)	–
3 Mbit/s	$895 DOP (US$17.90)	$890 DOP (US$17.80)	$1,290 DOP (US$25.80)	$699 DOP (US$13.98)
5 Mbit/s	$1,045 DOP (US$20.90)	$1,049 DOP (US$20.98)	$1,490 DOP (US$29.80)	$899 DOP (US$17.98)
10 Mbit/s	$1,345 DOP (US$26.90)	–	–	–
15 Mbit/s	–	$1,499 DOP (US$29.98)	–	–
20 Mbit/s	$1,595 DOP (US$34.67)	–	–	–
30 Mbit/s	–	$1,949 DOP (US$38.98)	–	–
40 Mbit/s	$1,945 DOP (US$38.90)	–	–	–
100 Mbit/s	$2,645 DOP (US$52.90)	$2,799 DOP (US$55.98)	–	–

*Note: The pricing and speeds are subject to change since Altice, Claro and Wind have multi plans (Two or Three services combined), those plans have a discount on all services. Up to 25% discount for combined services.

Pricing – Mobile Broadband (By ISP)

Currently the mobile internet market is governed by three aspects:

1. The first is based on a contract where you are granted a certain amount of data (MB/GB) per month, after having consumed the data you can continue browsing at 512 kbit/s.
2. Second option is a monthly income (postpaid) for the acquisition of a speed package with "unlimited data" (is subject to fair use policies with unlimited browsing at 512 kbit/s after you surpass the monthly capacity).
3. Third group belongs to the prepaid modality, in this option the client determines the number of days or amount of data he needs to navigate.

Data Caps	Claro Dominican Republic	Altice Dominicana S.A.	Wind Telecom (Dominican Republic)
5MB	$115 DOP (US$2.30)	–	–
50MB	$175 DOP (US$3.50)	–	–
250MB	$295 DOP (US$5.90)	–	–
2GB	$395 DOP (US$7.90)	–	–
5GB	$695 DOP (US$13.90)	$790 DOP (US$15.80)	$590 DOP (US$11.80)
10GB	$995 DOP (US$19.90)	$999 DOP (US$19.98)	–
15GB	$1,195 DOP (US$23.90)	$1,199 DOP (US$23.98)	$790 DOP (US$15.80)
20GB	$1,495 DOP (US$29.89)	$1,499 DOP (US$29.97)	–
25GB	$1,795 DOP (US$35.89)	$1,799 DOP (US$35.97)	$990 DOP (US$19.80)
40GB	–	–	$1,490 DOP (US$29.79)
50GB	$3,895 DOP (US$77.88)	$3,590 DOP (US$71.79)	–
60GB	–	–	$1,690 DOP (US$33.79)

Postpaid Speeds	Altice Dominicana S.A.	Wind Telecom (Dominican Republic)
1 Mbit/s	$799 DOP (US$15.80)	$790 DOP (US$15.80)
2 Mbit/s	–	$990 DOP (US$19.80)
3 Mbit/s	$999 DOP (US$19.98)	$1,290 DOP (US$25.79)
5 Mbit/s	$1,499 DOP (US$29.97)	$1,490 DOP (US$29.79)
10 Mbit/s	$1,999 DOP (US$39.97)	–

Prepaid Navigation	Days							
Prepaid Navigation	1	2	3	4	5	7	10	30
Viva (network operator)	$45 DOP (US$0.90)	$75 DOP (US$1.50)	–	$90 DOP (US$1.80)	–	$190 DOP (US$3.80)	–	$995 DOP (US$19.90)
WIND Telecom, S.A.	$35 DOP (US$0.70)	–	$100 DOP (US$2)	–	$200 DOP (US$4)	–	$340 DOP (US$6.80)	–

=== Internet censorship and surveillance ===
There are no government restrictions on access to the Internet or credible reports that the government monitors e-mail or Internet chat rooms without judicial oversight.

The constitution provides for freedom of speech and press, and the government generally respects these rights in practice. An independent press, an effective judiciary, and a functioning democratic political system ensure freedom of speech and press. The independent media are active and express a wide variety of views without restriction. Individuals and groups are generally able to criticize the government publicly and privately without reprisal, although there have been incidents in which authorities intimidated journalists or other news professionals. Local journalists engage in self-censorship, particularly when coverage could adversely affect the economic or political interests of media owners. The government denies using unauthorized wiretapping or other surreptitious methods to interfere with the private lives of individuals and families, however, human rights groups and opposition politicians allege that such interference does occur.

== See also ==
- Dominican Postal Institute
- North American Regional Broadcasting Agreement
