= .do =

Top-level Internet domain for the Dominican Republic

- Introduced: 25 August 1991
- TLD type: Country code top-level domain
- Status: Active
- Registry: NIC.DO
- Sponsor: Pontificia Universidad Catolica Madre y Maestra
- Intended use: Entities connected with Dominican Republic
- Actual use: Popular in the Dominican Republic, occasionally used for domain hacks (such as the Gizmodo URL shortener gizmo.do, and Nintendo URL shortener ninten.do)
- Registered domains: 38,059 (2023-6-13)
- Registration restrictions: None for most domains (.gov.do registrations require signed letter from government agency)
- Dispute policies: Política de Solución de Controversias
- DNSSEC: No
- Registry website: www.nic.do

.do is the country code top-level domain (ccTLD) for the Dominican Republic. The Network Information Center .do has administered the domain since 1991.

== Domains available ==
- .do: General use

=== Second-level ===
- .edu.do: Educational Institutions or Research
- .com.do: Commercial organizations
- .org.do: Non-governmental institutions
- .net.do: Internet service providers
- .gob.do/gov.do: Governmental institutions
- .web.do: Web Services Organizations
- .art.do: Arts institutions
- .sld.do: Institutions of health
- .mil.do: Military institutions

== See also ==
- Internet in the Dominican Republic
