= Claro Dominican Republic =

Telecommunications company in Dominican Republic

Compañía Dominicana de Teléfonos, S.A.
- Trade name: Claro
- Native name: Compañía Dominicana de Teléfonos, S.A.
- Type: Subsidiary of América Móvil
- Industry: Telecommunications
- Predecessor: CODETEL (1930–2004; 2007–2011); Verizon (2004–2007)
- Founded: November 11, 1930; 95 years ago
- Headquarters: 18°28′57″N 69°56′02″W; Edificio Corporativo Claro Dominicana, Avenida John F. Kennedy 54, Serrallés, Piantini, Santo Domingo, Distrito Nacional, 10510, Dominican Republic
- Area served: Dominican Republic
- Key people: Carlos José Cueto Stefani (President)
- Products: Broadband Internet services, local wireline and wireless telecommunication services, hosting, and digital cable
- Parent: Anglo Canadian Telephone Company (1930–1931); General Telephone & Electronics Corporation (1931–2004); Verizon Communications (2004–2007); América Móvil (since 2007)
- Website: claro.com.do (in Spanish)

Claro Dominicana (Compañía Dominicana de Teléfonos, S.A.) doing business as Claro (formerly CODETEL), is the largest telecommunications company in the Dominican Republic. The company provides local, long-distance, and wireless voice services, as well as Internet and IPTV services, to approximately four million customers.

== History ==
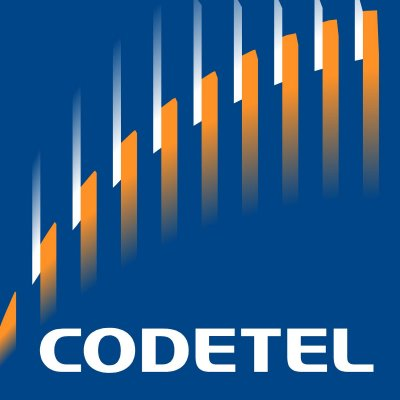
Logo used pre-Verizon Dominicana

Until 1930, telephone service had been administered by the government, but when the Hurricane San Zenon destroyed all the facilities, the Dominican government granted exclusive franchise for telecommunications services to the Anglo Canadian Telephone Company on November 11, 1930.

CODETEL began in the Dominican Republic in 1932 as a subsidiary of the U.S. firm General Telephone & Electric Corporation, and held a de facto monopoly until the mid-1990s, when Tricom began operations. After the Dominican government passed Law 153 in 1998 providing for effective liberalization and improved pro-competition regulation, new entrants had eroded CODETEL's predominant position with the incumbent capturing only 50% of the international traffic to the United States (accounting for 70% of the total international traffic). In 2000 Verizon was formed after a merger by Bell Atlantic and GTE, with CODETEL continuing operations as a subsidiary of the new company. In December 2003, CODETEL announced the commercial launch of its Flash Movil 3G network, a CDMA2000 1X voice and high-speed data network using equipment, software and services from Lucent Technologies.

=== Verizon Dominicana ===
Previously known as CODETEL (Compañía Dominicana de Teléfonos), the name change was announced February 2, 2004, at the National Theater of Santo Domingo in a ceremony to welcome the Verizon brand to the country. Verizon Dominicana was an independent country bought by Codetel and now is Claro.

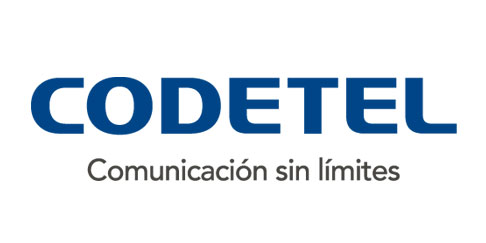
Logo and slogan used until 2011

=== América Móvil buyout ===
On April 3, 2006, Verizon agreed to sell its stakes in Verizon Dominicana along with Telecomunicaciones de Puerto Rico Inc. (TELPRI) in Puerto Rico to Carlos Slim Helú's group América Móvil for $3.7 billion. On January 31, 2007, the company's new owner América Móvil announced that the CODETEL brand would be used for its landline services and Claro for mobile services.

=== Present ===
On February 27, 2009, CODETEL launched Claro TV, a digital TV service based on Microsoft Mediaroom for urban areas and Direct To Home Satellite for rural areas. On January 20, 2011, Oscar Peña, the company's president, announced the company's brands would be unified and would become Claro as a part of a global unification across Latin America, where América Móvil's services are under the Claro brand.

On March 21, 2012, Claro announced the availability of Fiber to the Home plans for consumers.

== Services ==
=== Consumer ===
Claro Multiplan offers Telephone, Internet, and IPTV services. The bundles also include discounts on mobile Internet and mobile TV.

==== Internet ====
Claro provides Broadband Internet access to its customers over fixed ADSL2+, Fiber to the Home and mobile UMTS/HSPA. Speeds offered over Fiber are 20/2 (under a multiplan) and 100/5 (standalone).

As of August 2013, Fiber to the Home service is currently available in Altos de Arroyo Hondo II (Cerros de Arroyo Hondo, Cuesta Hermosa II, Isabel Villas, Altos de Arroyo Hondo II), La Julia, Evaristo Morales, La Esperilla, Naco, Serrallés, Paraíso, Los Cacicazgos, Julieta Morales, El Vergel, Piantini, Bella Vista, Viejo Arroyo Hondo, La Castellana, Nuevo Arroyo Hondo, Quisqueya, Urbanización Renacimiento, Urbanización Real, Mirador Norte, Arroyo Hondo III, Mirador Sur, Res. Carmen María, and Los Millones in Santo Domingo and in Cerros de Gurabo I and II, Quinta de Pontezuela, Las Carmelitas, and La Trinitaria in Santiago.

Speeds offered for fixed ADSL2+ internet on standalone plans and on Multiplans are as follows:

ADSL2+
Multiplan		Standalone	
Download	Upload	Download	Upload
512kbit/s	256kbit/s	1Mbit/s	256kbit/s
1Mbit/s	256kbit/s	1.5Mbit/s	256kbit/s
1.5Mbit/s	256kbit/s	2Mbit/s	512kbit/s
2Mbit/s	1Mbit/s	3Mbit/s	768kbit/s
3Mbit/s	768kbit/s	4Mbit/s	1Mbit/s
5Mbit/s	1Mbit/s	6Mbit/s	1Mbit/s
		8Mbit/s	1Mbit/s
		10Mbit/s	1Mbit/s

As of September 2012, Claro's Multiplan download speeds can be doubled for an additional monthly cost.

Claro's mobile internet packages are as follows:

Type	Data allowance	Time Active
Postpaid	100MB	N/A
Postpaid	500MB	N/A
Postpaid	3GB	N/A
Postpaid	5GB	N/A
Postpaid	10GB	N/A
Prepaid	200MB	1 Day
Prepaid	350MB	3 Days
Prepaid	700MB	7 Day
Prepaid	1.5GB	15 Days
Prepaid	3GB	30 Days
Prepaid	6GB	60 Days

==== Television ====
Claro offers fixed television services over Microsoft Mediaroom and satellite. It also provides mobile television services over Rok TV. Mobile television services are offered as daily and monthly packages.

==== Telephony ====
Claro offers fixed landline telephone services as well as services over CDMA 1xEV-DO in 800/1900 MHz, GSM/GPRS/EDGE in 850/1900 MHz, and 3G UMTS/HSPA service on the 850 MHz band.

=== Enterprise ===
Claro offers their enterprise customers mobile and fixed telephone, mobile, fixed, dedicated, and satellite Internet, satellite tv, Internet backhaul, colocation, web hosting, IPTV, equipment rental, and SMS services.

== Management ==
The current president of Claro Dominican Republic is Carlos José Cueto Stefani.

== See also ==
- Telecommunications in the Dominican Republic
