= André Bier Gerdau Johannpeter =

Brazilian businessman

Andre Bier Gerdau Johannpeter
- Born: March 17, 1963 (age 63); Porto Alegre, Brazil
- Education: Wharton School of Business; Hult International Business School; Pontifícia Universidade Católica do Rio Grande do Sul
- Occupation: co-Vice Chairman of Gerdau
- Spouse: Maria Teresa Campos

André Bier Gerdau Johannpeter
Medal record

Equestrian

Representing Brazil

Olympic Games
Bronze medal – third place	1996 Atlanta	Team jumping
Bronze medal – third place	2000 Sydney	Team jumping

André Johannpeter (born 17 March 1963) is a Brazilian businessman who is co-Vice Chairman of Gerdau. He is also a former Olympic equestrian.

== Biography ==
=== Early life and education ===
André Bier Gerdau Johannpeter was born in Porto Alegre on March 17, 1963. He is the son of Jorge Gerdau Johannpeter and Erica Bier.

Johannpeter obtained a bachelor's degree in business administration from Pontifícia Universidade Católica do Rio Grande do Sul and completed his academic training with courses in general business administration from University of Toronto, Canada, marketing from Ashridge Business School (now part of Hult International Business School) and the Advanced Management Program from Wharton School, in University of Pennsylvania, United States.

=== Career ===
Johannpeter began his career at age 16, as an assistant plant operator at Gerdau in 1980.

In 1989, he was appointed executive officer of Gerdau until he became Director of Information Systems in 1998. After a year, he became Director of New Business Development before he was appointed as Vice President, North American Operations. In November 2003, he served as Vice President of Business Development.

From July 2004 to March 2006, Johannpeter was the chief operating officer. From January 2007 to 2017, he was President and chief executive officer.

In 2008, he became a member of the board of directors. He is also a member of the Strategy Committee of the board of directors. In addition, since January 1, 2007, he has served as President Officer and president of the Executive Committee of the parent company Metalurgica Gerdau S.A. and President Officer of the subsidiary Seiva S.A Florestas Industrias.

=== Charges of bribery, tax evasion, and money laundering (2016) ===
In March 2015 and in February 2016, Gerdau's offices in São Paulo, Brasília, Rio de Janeiro, Recife and Porto Alegre, the company's headquarters, were raided by the Brazilian federal police as part of Operation Zealots, a probe into tax fraud. The company and Gerdau personally were sued on claims that "executives bribed tax authorities, defrauded Brazil's tax revenue service of $429 million, laundered illegal funds and carried out influence peddling". In 2017, the company agreed to pay $15 million to settle the claims.

=== Additional affiliations and memberships ===
In September 2018, the World Steel Association elected Johannpeter as chairman for the 2018-2019 year.

=== Olympic career ===
As an equestrian, Johannpeter won a bronze medal in show jumping, with horse Calei, at the 1996 Summer Olympics in Atlanta. At the 2000 Summer Olympics in Sydney he again won a bronze medal, once again with horse Calei, with the Brazilian team, and placed fourth in the individual contest.

== Personal life ==
Johannpeter is married to Maria Teresa Campos, they have three children.
