= Metaldom =

Steel manufacturer based in Dominican Republic

Complejo Metalúrgico Dominicano, S. A. (METALDOM)
- Industry: Ferrous metallurgy
- Founded: 1967; 59 years ago
- Headquarters: Santo Domingo, Dominican Republic
- Products: Long steel, specialty steel, flat steel, and other steel products
- Website: metaldom.com

Complejo Metalúrgico Dominicano, S. A. (METALDOM) is the largest steel manufacturer in the Dominican Republic, with an annual capacity of 1 million tons.

== History ==
The company was founded in 1967.

In October 2014, Metaldom merged with Industrias Nacionales (INCA), then a subsidiary of Gerdau, to form Gerdau Metaldom. At that time, the company operated 3 plants with an annual capacity of 1 million tons of rolled products. INCA was founded in 1947. Gerdau had acquired a 30.45% stake in INCA in 2007 for $42 million.

In 2016, the company opened a new steel plant to produce cut and bend wire rod steel for construction.

In June 2022, the company dismantled its plant on the Malecón in Santo Domingo.

In February 2024, Gerdau sold its 50% interest in the company to INICIA, which already owned the other 50% interest.
