= Altice Dominicana =

Dominican telecommunications company

Altice Dominicana, S.A.
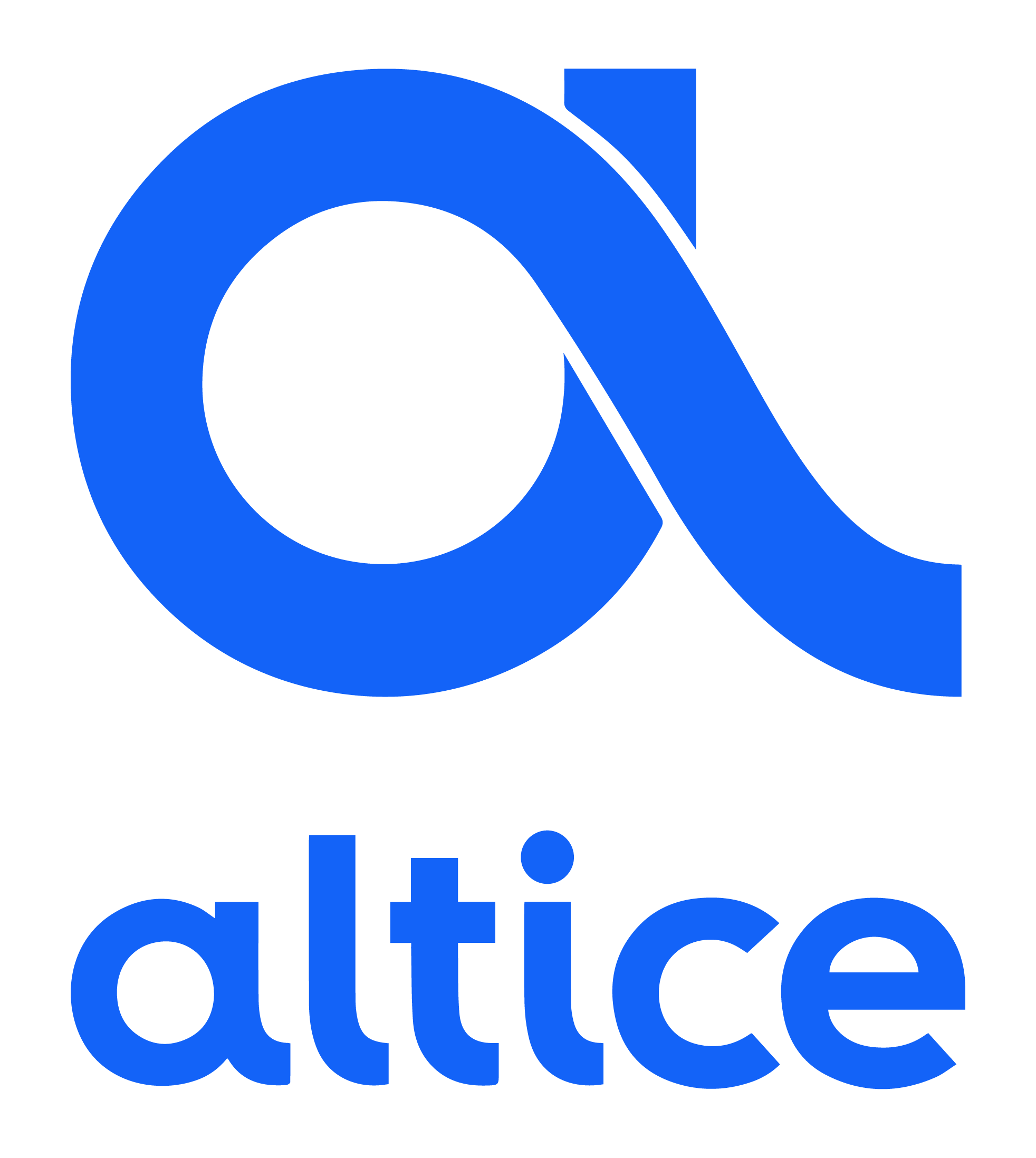
- Trade name: Altice
- Type: Subsidiary of Altice Group Lux Sàrl
- Industry: Telecommunications
- Predecessor: Tricom, S.A. (1988–2017); Orange Dominicana, S.A. (2000–2007)
- Founded: 1988; 38 years ago (as Tricom); November 21, 2017; 8 years ago (as Altice Dominicana)
- Headquarters: 18°27′02″N 69°57′06″W; Altice Tower, Avenida Nuñez de Cáceres 8, Bella Vista, Santo Domingo, Distrito Nacional, 10114, Dominican Republic
- Key people: Danilo Ginebra (CEO)
- Products: Broadband Internet services, landline, wireless telecommunication services, hosting, and digital cable.
- Parent: Altice Group Lux Sàrl
- Website: www.altice.com.do (in Spanish)

Altice Dominicana (Altice Dominicana, S.A.), doing business as Altice (formerly Tricom), is the second largest landline service provider in the Dominican Republic. Since 2013, it is part of the French Netherlands-based Altice. It owns and operates a major HDTV Cable TV service (which also operated under its former names "Telecable Nacional" and "Tricom") along with landline and wireless voice services. Its ISP branch offers residential bandwidth with speeds up to 300 Mbit/s and is also a national mobile network operator.

== Background ==
In 1988, Zona Franca de San Isidro spawned San Isidro Teleport, which was later renamed Tricom. In 1990, the company had reached an agreement with the Dominican Republic to provide communications services nationwide.

== Timeline ==
On May 20, 1992, the company began to implement "Long Distance Call Centers", entering the business of international long-distance services.

In 1993, Tricom sold Motorola a 40% stake in the company with a goal of improving their local and international infrastructure.

On November 17, 1994, Tricom and CODETEL connected their telephone exchanges, allowing a massive installation of residential lines. Following is the implementation of pagers, paging services, and mobile products. In 1995 the first long-distance prepaid card, "Efectiva", was made public.

Logos used up to 2011 and from that date onwards

In 1996, Tricom implemented Motorola's Digital Telephone services which allowed the installation of residential and business lines in just 48 hours. Amigo, the country's first prepaid wireless provider, is launched in 1997. Meanwhile, TRICOM USA is created to offer long-distance services to the Hispanic community in New York City.

In 1998, Tricom placed 5,700,000 shares of common stock in the New York Stock Exchange (NYSE), becoming the first Dominican company to be listed in the U.S. stock market.

In 1999, the company achieved 300,000 customers, becoming the leader in mobile communications in addition to servicing 68% of the country's landlines.

In 2004, the company was de-listed from the NYSE.

On June 5, 2012, Tricom announced their intent to begin a buildout of a Hybrid fibre-coaxial network across Bayahibe, Bonao, Casa de Campo, La Romana, La Vega, San Cristóbal, San Francisco de Macorís, San Pedro de Macorís, Santiago, and Santo Domingo.

On July 4, 2012, Tricom announced they were going to begin a build out of a 4G-LTE network.

On March 13, 2013, Tricom launched a video on demand service, becoming the second Dominican provider after Claro República Dominicana to offer a VOD service.

On March 18, 2013, Tricom launched their 4G-LTE network and became the second Dominican provider after Orange to offer LTE for modems.

On May 2, 2013, Tricom launched their LTE network for mobile phones, becoming the first Dominican provider to offer LTE for mobiles.

On November 27, 2013, Orange sold its Dominican unit to Tricom's Parent company, Altice, for US$1.435 billion. The merger was approved and finalized on November 21, 2017, with the Orange and Tricom brand names permanently retired and both of Tricom's and Orange's Cellular networks integrated to Altice's own cellular network. The company began using the Altice name as their brand for their services.

== See also ==
- Telecommunications in the Dominican Republic
