= Plaza Lama =

Dominican department store and supermarket chain

Dominican Republic supermarket store, Plaza Lama sign 2024

Plaza Lama is one of the main department store and supermarket chains of the Dominican Republic. The business is managed by Mario Lama Handal and his children. He owns several businesses: Plaza Lama, SuperLama, ElectroLama, Comercial Fila, SGN (Soluciones en Gas Natural) and more.

== Origins ==
The Lama company was founded in 1929 in San Pedro de Macorís by Pedro Juan Lama and his wife, Afife Handal, both Palestinian immigrants to the Dominican Republic. It was relocated to Avenue Duarte in Santo Domingo in the 1940s. Mario Lama Handal founded Plaza Lama and expanded his shoe business into a department store. As time went on, further department stores were opened in the city and in La Romana and Santiago.

== Present day ==
The Plaza Lama group now runs department stores, ElectroLama electrical goods stores, Súper Lama supermarkets, wholesale distribution, two television channels, and supply of consumer essentials, vehicles and natural gas. The annual profits of Lama Group is estimated to be approximately 35 million dollars.
