= João Gerdau =

German-born Brazilian businessman

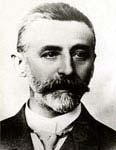
- João Gerdau
- Born: Johannes Heinrich Kaspar Gerdau; 14 November 1849; Altona, Hamburg, Germany
- Died: 24 November 1917 (aged 68)
- Known for: Founder of Gerdau

João Gerdau (born Johannes Heinrich Kaspar Gerdau, 14 November 1849 - 24 November 1917) was a German-born Brazilian businessman and the founder of Gerdau.

== Biography ==
=== Early life and education ===
Gerdau was born in 1849 in Altona, Hamburg, Germany, the son of farmers Johannes Gerdau and Anna Focken. He completed a technical accounting course at a technical school in Hamburg.

=== Career ===
In 1869, Gerdau emigrated to southern Brazil to find new business opportunities. He arrived at the port of Rio Grande, Rio Grande do Sul aged 20, and established himself in Colônia de Santo Ângelo (now the town of Agudo), where he invested in trade, transport and the subdivision of land. He moved to the town of Cachoeira do Sul in 1884, where he founded a General Store. In 1901, he bought a nail factory in Porto Alegre and founded Gerdau.

His son, Hugo Gerdau, inherited the business, and in turn, passed it to his son-in-law Curt Johannpeter in 1946.

=== Personal life ===
Gerdau was married to Alvine Maria Sophie Gerdau and had 4 children.
