= Administrative regions of the Dominican Republic by GDP =

The Dominican Republic, a country in the Caribbean, boasts one of the region's most dynamic economies. With a GDP (Gross Domestic Product) of approximately 127.356 billion USD in 2024, it stands out as one of the largest economies in the Caribbean. The GDP per capita, a measure reflecting the average economic output per person, is around US$11,774, highlighting the country's relative economic development compared to its Caribbean neighbors.

== Administrative subdivisions ==
The Dominican Republic's ten administrative subdivisions each play a unique role in the nation's economy, with most having an industrial and agricultural base. Cibao Nordeste and Cibao Noroeste are both significant agricultural hubs, known for their production of rice, cocoa, and other agro-industrial products. Cibao Norte, combines strong agricultural outputs, including tobacco and coffee, with emerging industrial sectors. Cibao Sur focuses on rice and vegetable production, along with a growing industrial base. El Valle is predominantly agricultural, recognized for its coffee and bean production.

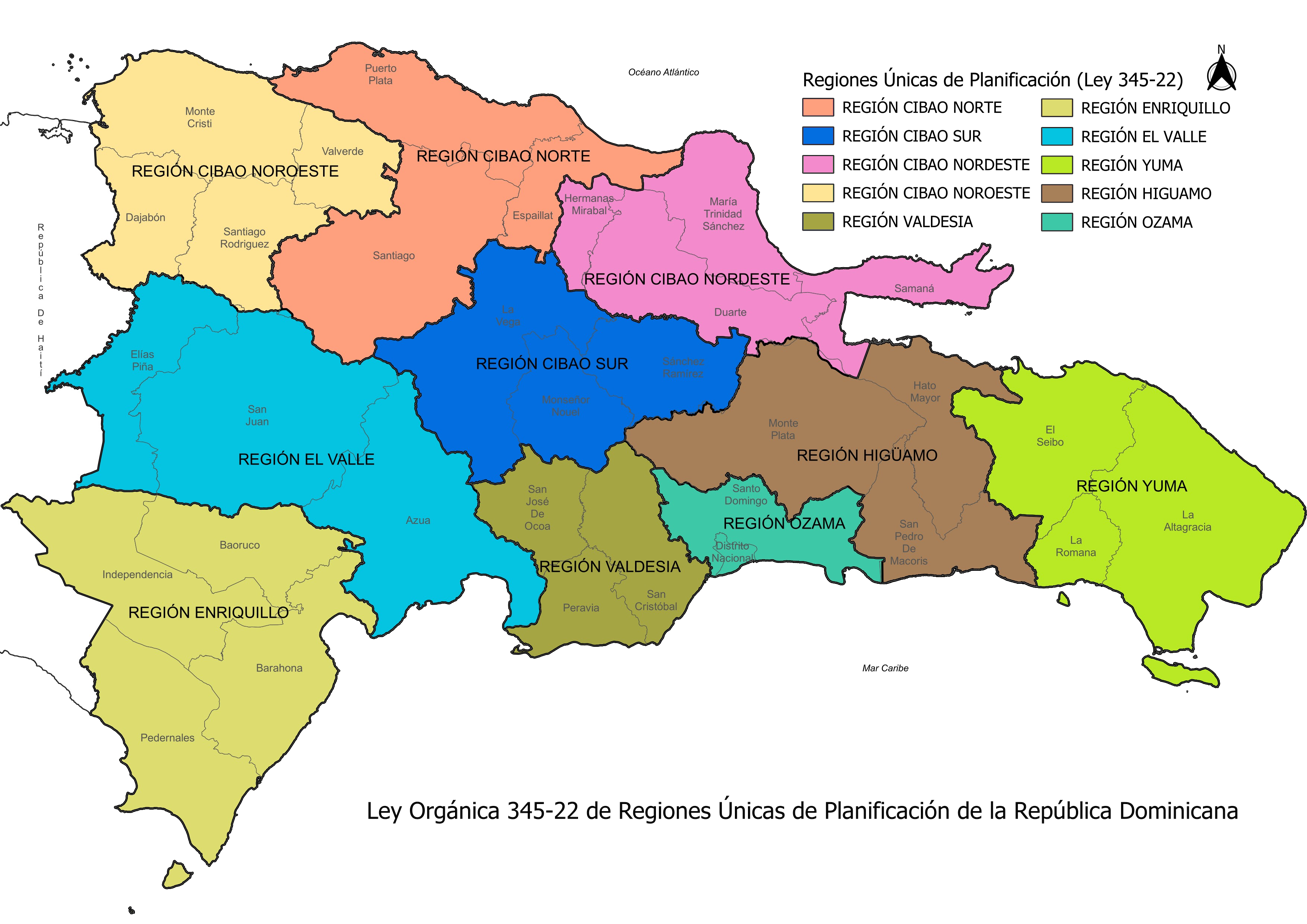
The 10 Administrative Subdivisions of the Dominican Republic with their respective 31 Provinces and it's Nacional District.

In contrast, Enriquillo features extensive banana and coffee plantations. Higüamo offers a diverse economic profile, balancing agriculture, livestock, and industrial activities. The most economically significant subdivision is Ozama, home to the capital city, Santo Domingo, and a center for finance, commerce, and services. Valdesia relies on agriculture, particularly sugar cane and livestock production. Lastly, Yuma stands out with its booming tourism sector, home to Punta Cana, the country's biggest tourism hub, supported by coastal resorts, alongside traditional agricultural activities. Each subdivision contributes uniquely to the Dominican Republic's economic landscape.

== Table ==
Data based on TelluBase Dominican Republic Fact Sheet 2023 data; can be reranked or reordered by any relevant data.

GDP and GDP Per Capita of Dominican Administrative Subdivisions - (Constant 2015 Values)
Rank	Administrative Subdivisions	Nominal GDP Estimate (Billions)	GDP PPP Estimate (Billions)	Per Capita Estimate	PPP Per Capita Estimate	Population Estimate (Millions)	Year
1	Ozama	$42.9	$84.2	$9,900	$19,500	4.31	2023
2	Cibao Norte	$16.6	$32.7	$9,500	$18,700	1.75	2023
3	Valdesia	$9.5	$18.6	$7,900	$15,500	1.20	2023
4	Cibao Sur	$7.2	$14.1	$9,100	$17,800	0.79	2023
5	Yuma	$5.9	$11.6	$7,500	$14,700	0.79	2023
6	Cibao Nordeste	$5.8	$11.5	$8,500	$16,600	0.69	2023
7	Higüamo	$4.7	$9.2	$7,500	$14,700	0.63	2023
8	Cibao Noroeste	$3.4	$6.7	$7,600	$14,900	0.45	2023
9	Eriquillo	$2.8	$5.6	$6,900	$13,600	0.41	2023
10	El Valle	$2.1	$4.1	$6,900	$13,500	0.30	2023
