= Gerdau =

Brazilian steelmaker

Gerdau S.A.
- Type: Sociedade Anônima
- Traded as: B3: GGBR3, GGBR4; NYSE: GGB; BMAD: XGGB; Ibovespa Component
- Industry: Ferrous metallurgy
- Founded: January 16, 1901; 125 years ago
- Founder: João Gerdau
- Headquarters: Porto Alegre, RS, Brazil
- Key people: Guilherme Chagas Gerdau Johannpeter, Chairman; André Bier Gerdau Johannpeter, co-Vice Chairman; Claudio Johannpeter, co-Vice Chairman; Gustavo Werneck da Cunha, CEO
- Products: Long steel, specialty steel, flat steel, and other steel products
- Revenue: ▼ R$68.916 billion (2023)
- Net income: ▲ R$7.536 billion (2023)
- Total assets: ▲ R$74.885 billion (2023)
- Total equity: ▲ R$49.238 billion (2023)
- Number of employees: 27,371 (2023)
- Website: www2.gerdau.com

Gerdau S.A. is the largest producer of long steel in the Americas, and the 33rd largest steelmaker worldwide, with approximately 13 million tons of production in 2023. Gerdau uses mini mills, integrated mills, and direct reduced iron plants; 71% of the steel manufactured by the company is made from recycled scrap. In 2023, 39% of sales were to Brazil and 39% of sales were to North America.

Substantially all of the common shares of the company are owned by Jorge Gerdau Johannpeter and his family; however, non-voting preferred shares, representing a minority interest in the company, are publicly traded.

== History ==
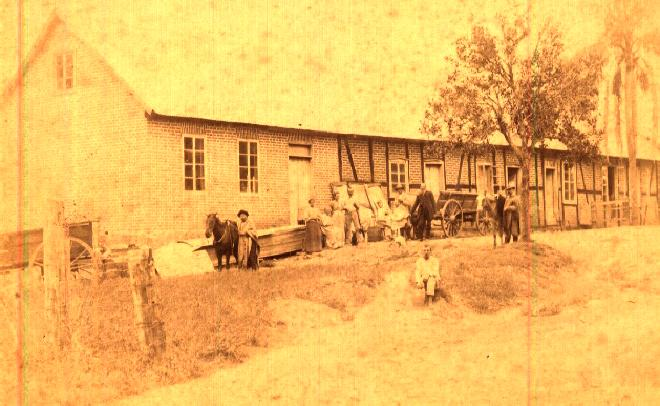
Residence and company Estate Society João Gerdau, 1885

Gerdau was founded as the Pontas de Paris nail manufacturing business by João Gerdau, a German migrant who left the port of Hamburg for Rio Grande do Sul, in Brazil, in 1869 in search of new business opportunities.

He passed the business to his son, Hugo Gerdau, who, in 1946, passed it to his son-in-law Curt Johannpeter. After the end of World War II, the nail factory struggled to find raw material. To secure raw materials, the company acquired a steel mill in 1948. By the 1960s, the mill was at capacity and in 1967, the company acquired a minimill in São Paulo. In 1969, the company was renamed Metalúrgica Gerdau S.A. In 1970, the company became a public company via listings on the Rio de Janeiro Stock Exchange and São Paulo Stock Exchange. In the 1980s, the company acquired more steel mills during the privatization of state-owned Brazilian steel companies. By the end of the 1980s, the company had a 40% market share in long steel in Brazil and faced regulatory scrutiny for further acquisitions. In 1983, Curt Johannpeter died and his sons took over management of the business.

In 1989, the company expanded to Canada with the acquisition of Courtice Steel.

In March 1999, the company's American depositary receipts were listed on the New York Stock Exchange.

In August 1999, the company expanded to the U.S. with the acquisition of 75% of AmeriSteel from Kyoei Steel; production outside Brazil then accounted for 40% of the company's business.

In 2002, Courtice Steel and AmeriSteel were merged into Co-Steel, a publicly traded Canadian steel manufacturer, which was then renamed AmeriSteel. In November 2004, it acquired North Star Steel from Cargill for $266 million. In 2007, it acquired Charparral Steel for $4.22 billion in cash. In April 2008, it acquired MacSteel for $1.46 billion.

In 2007, Gerdau acquired a 30.45% stake in Industrias Nacionales (INCA), the largest steel producer in the Dominican Republic, for $42 million. In October 2014, INCA merged with Metaldom to form Gerdau Metaldom.

In August 2010, the company paid $1.7 billion to take full ownership of AmeriSteel, its North American unit.

In September 2010, the company acquired Tamco for $165 million.

In January 2018, the company sold its wire rod mill in Beaumont, Texas and two downstream facilities to Optimus Steel for $92.5 million.

In November 2018, the company sold 33 rebar manufacturing facilities and 4 EAF mini mills to Commercial Metals Company for $600 million.

In 2019, it sold its assets in India for $120 million.

In December 2020, the company acquired Siderúrgica Latino Americana (Silat) for $110.8 million.

In 2019, the company formed Gerdau Graphene in partnership with the Graphene Engineering and Innovation Centre (GEIC) at the University of Manchester. It is involved in the development and commercialization of graphene additives and materials for industrial applications.

In March 2024, the company sold its assets in Colombia and the Dominican Republic, including its interest in Metaldom, to INICIA for $325 million.

In September 2024, the company acquired Dale's Recycling, an auto scrap recycler in Tennessee, Kentucky, and Missouri, for $60 million.

In 2025, the company acquired the minority interests in Gerdau Summit from Sumitomo Corporation and Japan Steel Works for a total of $32.6 million.

== Controversies and legal issues ==
=== Charges of bribery, tax evasion, and money laundering (2016) ===
In March 2015 and in February 2016, Gerdau's offices in São Paulo, Brasília, Rio de Janeiro, Recife and Porto Alegre, the company's headquarters, were raided by the Brazilian federal police as part of Operation Zealots, a probe into tax fraud. The company and then CEO André Bier Gerdau Johannpeter personally were sued on claims that "executives bribed tax authorities, defrauded Brazil's tax revenue service of $429 million, laundered illegal funds and carried out influence peddling". In 2017, the company agreed to pay $15 million to shareholders to settle the claims.

== See also ==
- List of steel producers
