= Dominican Republic and the International Monetary Fund and the World Bank =

The Dominican Republic is a lower middle-income country stretching over 18,172 miles on the Island of Hispaniola. It has the tenth largest economy in Latin America, and the largest economy in the Caribbean region. Agriculture, tourism, Free Trade Zone (FTZ) Manufacturing, and mining (gold, ferronickel, silver, bauxite, limestone, and zinc) drive the economy.

Due to the FTZ Model, the DR has an open market economy that is free from tariffs, subsidies, licensing requirements, unions, and other regulations which has made trade with other countries easier, quicker, and cheaper. This is why there was a recent boost in exports resulting in an improved GDP growth.

== Relationship with the World Bank ==
The World Bank has sent the Dominican Republic $230 million (2016), $1 million (2017), $150 million (2018), and $180 million in 2019. The loans vary each year depending on existing loans, urgency, and other factors that influence the Project Cycle. World Bank projects in the Dominican Republic vary from expanding the energy sector, improving education, to strengthening infrastructure.

== Relationship with IMF ==
The Dominican Republic joined the IMF December 28, 1945. The goal of the IMF is to ensure financial stability and are the final resort for countries who are struggling. Government officials have abused the IMF by using them as a way to save the economy to cover up scandals of corruption. For instance, in 2002 the Dominican Republic went through a Recession after the Bank, Baninter went bankrupt. President Mejia bailed out the bank despite the negligence of the Bank management resulting in the loss of $2.2 billion. President Mejia only received $120 of the $600 million he asked from the IMF. The Dominican Republic lost 67% of the annual budget and about $700 million.

The Dominican Recession (2002) brought a halt to the steady rapid growth brought by the telecommunications and mining sectors. The DR was exporting good and unemployment was down. However, due to the corruption and decision by President Mejia to bail out the bank, Baninter, that went Bankrupt. President Mejia only received $120 million of the $600 million he asked from the IMF to save the country. In 2004, an additional $66 million was disbursed to aid the economy after losing $700 million in bank bailouts.

== The economy ==
Rural and underdeveloped areas of the Dominican Republic and cheap immigrant labor (usually from neighboring country, Haiti), provide most of the labor force behind the growing economy. The economy grew 7.1% between 2014 and 2016 by exporting at low prices. The DR exports 50% of their products to the U.S., and over 500 U.S. companies manufacture products in the Dominican Republic.

The downside to the FTZ model is that it strongly depends on the global market and will not sustain itself in the long run. The country still has high levels of poverty despite a growing economy because it continues to lack investing in human capital. There continues to be tension with the Dominican people because much of this economic strength has come at the cost of depleting natural resources and heavily impacting the health of many Dominicans, especially those who work/live near mines. In order to achieve economic prosperity, they must lower their dependency on the global market, prepare for natural disasters (infrastructure, emergency/medical personnel), improve human capital (investing in education), manage natural resources carefully (overmining & polluting water sources), and government officials must be held accountable for decisions they make that affect the Dominican population.
