= Wind Telecom (Dominican Republic) =

Dominican telecommunications company

WIND Telecom
- Formerly: Santiago Satélite Solar, C. por A.
- Type: S.A.
- Industry: Telecommunications
- Founded: May 5, 1991
- Headquarters: Santo Domingo, Dominican Republic
- Area served: Dominican Republic
- Products: Mobile telephony, fixed telephony
- Website: www.wind.com.do

WIND Telecom, S.A. is a telecommunications company in the Dominican Republic which operates networks for wireless Internet over WiMAX, VoIP telephony, and cable over MMDS in the Dominican Republic.

== History ==
WIND Telecom was founded in May 5, 1991 in Santiago as Santiago Satélite Solar, C. por A.

In 2006, Golden Days Corporation acquires the actions of Santiago Satélite Solar, C por A.

In June 14, 2007 changes the comercial name to WIND Telecom.

On January 29, 2010 WIND announced a partnership with Samsung Electronics to build out their WiMAX network. On November 29, 2010 WIND launched their WiMAX network in Santiago. On March 30, 2011 WIND announced their network buildout had been completed.

In June 2014, media announced the deployment of a TDD-LTE based network built by ZTE.

== Services ==
=== Consumer ===
WIND Telecom provides bundled services under the WIND brand. These bundles offer discounts on their Television, Internet, and Telephone services.

Internet is provided over WiMAX. As of December 2012, their available speeds are as follows.

Prepaid		Postpaid	
Download	Upload	Download	Upload
512kbit/s	256kbit/s	1Mbit/s	256kbit/s
1Mbit/s	256kbit/s	1.5Mbit/s	512kbit/s
1.5Mbit/s	384kbit/s	2Mbit/s	512kbit/s
2Mbit/s	512kbit/s	3Mbit/s	1Mbit/s
3Mbit/s	768kbit/s	Unlimited	

=== Enterprise ===
WIND offers symmetric and asymmetric Internet over WiMAX as well as Internet Backhaul over fibre or microwave. WIND also provides SIP telephone, television, and virtual fax services.
