= Groth =

Groth is a German surname. Notable people with the surname include:

- Annette Groth (born 1954), German politician
- Annette Groth (journalist) (born 1952), Norwegian correspondent
- Camilla Groth (born 1973), Norwegian poet
- Carl-Gustav Groth (1933–2014), Swedish transplant surgeon
- Edward J. Groth (born 1946), American astrophysicist
- Ernest Groth (1922–2004), baseball player
- Ernie Groth (1884–1950), American baseball player
- Gary Groth (born 1954), American comic book editor, publisher, and critic
- Harald Groth (1943–2925), German politician
- Helge Groth (1913–1966), Norwegian literary historian and diplomat
- Henrik Groth (1903–1983), Norwegian publisher and essayist
- Jacob Groth (born 1951), Danish film composer
- Jan Groth (1946–2014), Norwegian musician
- Jarmila Groth (born 1987), Slovak-Australian tennis player
- Jeff Groth (American football) (born 1957), American football player
- Jeff Groth (film editor), film and television editor
- Jens Groth, Danish cryptography researcher
- Johannes Groth (born 1988), Greenlandic handball player and coach
- John Groth (1908–1988), Illustrator
- Johnny Groth (1926–2021), baseball player
- Jonathan Groth (born 1992), Danish table tennis player
- Katrina Groth (born 1982), American mechanical engineer and professor
- Klaus Groth (1819–1899), German poet
- Martin Groth (born 1969), German football player
- Miles Groth (born 1946), American philosopher
- Morgan Groth (born 1943), American middle-distance runner
- Olaf Groth, German-American innovation scholar
- Paul Groth (tennis), American tennis player
- Paul Heinrich von Groth (1843–1927), German mineralogist
- Reg Groth (1914–1994), Australian politician
- René Groth (born 1972), German football player
- Richard Groth (1946–2021), American politician
- Sam Groth (born 1987), Australian tennis player
- Stephen Fazekas de St. Groth, Hungarian-Australia microbiologist
- Stephan Groth (born 1971), Danish musician
- Sylvester Groth (born 1958), German actor and tenor
- Vilhelm Groth (1842–1899), Danish landscape painter
- Wilhelm Groth (1904–1977), German physical chemist

== See also ==
- The extended Groth Strip, an image of a small region in the constellation Ursa Major
