= Aegis (disambiguation) =

Aegis is the shield used by Athena and Zeus.

Aegis may also refer to:

== Arts, entertainment and media ==
=== Fictional entities ===
- Aegis (Trey Rollins), in Marvel Comics
- Aegis (Lady of All Sorrows), in Marvel Comics
- A.E.G.I.S., a fictional organisation in the anime Gate Keepers
- Aegis, the shield of Thalia Grace in Rick Riordan's 2007 novel The Titan's Curse
- Aigis (Persona), or Aegis, in role-playing game Persona 3
- Aegis, the shield wielded by Gallantmon in the Digimon series
- Aegis VII, a planet in the video game Dead Space
- AEGIS, a government organisation in the role-playing game Conspiracy X
- The Aegis, a pair of characters in Xenoblade Chronicles 2
- AEGIS (Aperture Employee Guardian and Intrusion System), in Portal Stories: Mel

=== Literature and publications ===
- Aegis (newspaper), in Oakland, California, U.S.
- The Aegis (newspaper), a local newspaper in Harford County, Maryland, U.S.
- The Aegis, a Dartmouth College publication

=== Music ===
- Aégis (album), by Theatre of Tragedy, 1998
- Aegis (band), a Filipino rock band

=== Gaming ===
- AEGIS: Guardian of the Fleet, a 1994 video game

== Businesses and organisations ==
=== Businesses ===
- Aegis Defence Services, a British security services company
- Aegis Group, now Dentsu International

=== Organisations ===
- Africa-Europe Group for Interdisciplinary Studies, a research network
- Aegis the Union, a British trade union
- Aegis Trust, a British anti-genocide NGO
- Allied Employees Guild Improving Sega, a video game trade union
- Association for the Education and Guardianship of International Students, a British organisation
- Aid for the Elderly in Government Institutions, a British pressure group

== Science and technology ==
- AIDS Education Global Information System, a database of AIDS information
- AEGIS (astronomy) (All-Wavelength Extended Groth Strip International Survey)
- Artificially Expanded Genetic Information System, a synthetic DNA analog experiment
- AEGIS (SuperCam), (Autonomous Exploration for Gathering Increased Science) on the Perseverance rover
- AEgIS experiment, the Antimatter Experiment: Gravity, Interferometry, Spectroscopy
- AEGIS SecureConnect, a network authentication system
- AEGIS, or Domain/OS, the original Apollo operating system
- LG Aegis, a mobile phone
- AEGIS Authenticator, a one-time password application for Android
- Aegis (moon), a moon of asteroid 93 Minerva

== Military ==
- Aegis Combat System, an American integrated naval weapons system
  - Aegis Ballistic Missile Defense System, an American program
- Kimber Aegis, a series of pistols

== See also ==
- Aizis or Aigis, a Dacian town and later Roman castrum in Dacia
