= Unemployment in China =

Overview of the situation in the People's Republic of China

Unemployment has been a serious social issue in the People's Republic of China in recent years, regarding both an increase in quantity and an unequal impact on different social regions. The influence of foreign investment in China has greatly increased since the reform and opening up was implemented in the early 1980s. The relationship between foreign-funded enterprises and urban labor market development is dual. Opponents influence the shape of labor-market regulation; however, foreign-funded enterprises have also become a major source of demand for urban and rural areas migrant workers. Demographic factors also affect unemployment in China, such as age and sex. The position of women in the labor market has been deteriorating, with a decline in labor force participation rate, rising unemployment, increased work intensity and a widening gender pay gap.

== Definition and calculation method ==
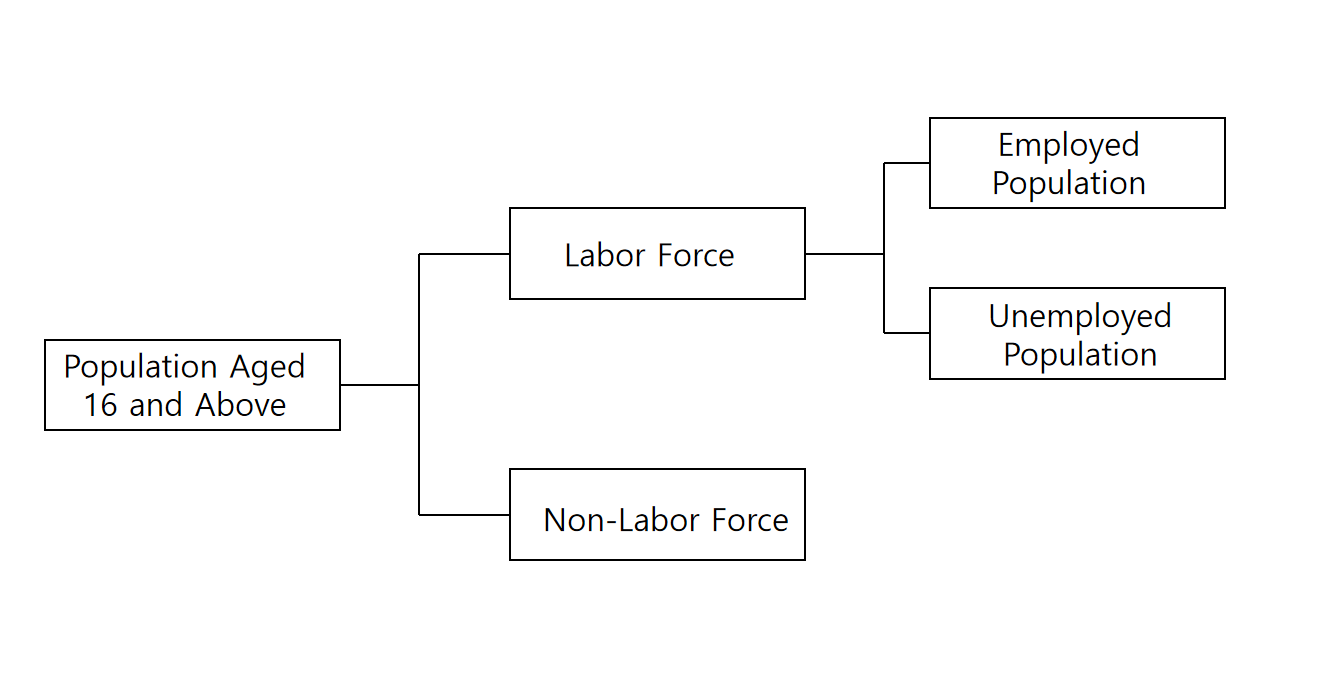
Classification of Population Aged 16 and Above

The surveyed unemployment rate is defined as the percentage of the unemployed population relative to the sum of the employed and unemployed populations, calculated through a sample survey estimation. The formula is as follows: Surveyed Unemployment Rate = (Number of Unemployed Persons) / (Number of Unemployed Persons + Number of Employed Persons) × 100%.

The unemployment rate formula in China is calculated by dividing the number of unemployed individuals by the total labor force, which includes only the employed and unemployed populations, excluding the non-labor force population (such as retirees or students not seeking employment). Thus, the surveyed unemployment rate indicates the proportion of unemployed individuals within the labor force, not within the total population aged 16 and above. For instance, a 5.0% urban unemployment rate reflects that 5 out of every 100 individuals in the labor force are unemployed, rather than 5 out of every 100 individuals aged 16 and over.

The definitions of employment and unemployment align with the standards set by the 19th International Conference of Labour Statisticians of the International Labour Organization (ILO). "Employed persons" include individuals aged 16 and above who worked at least one hour for pay or profit during the reference week. This category also includes those temporarily absent from work due to reasons such as training, vacation, or illness, provided they intend to return within one month. "Unemployed persons" refer to individuals aged 16 and above who were not employed during the reference week but had actively sought work within the previous three months and were available to work within two weeks, including those awaiting job opportunities scheduled to start within three months. The urban unemployment rate represents the ratio of unemployed persons to the combined total of employed and unemployed persons within urban areas.

== Survey methodology and data collection ==
China's surveyed unemployment rate is derived from the Monthly Labor Force Survey, which employs a stratified, multi-stage sampling method with probability proportional to size (PPS). This method involves randomly selecting neighborhood (or village) committees, followed by systematic sampling of households within these areas. Each month, approximately 340,000 households are surveyed, covering all prefecture-level and county-level regions in mainland China. At a 90% confidence level, the relative error of the urban surveyed unemployment rate is within 2%. For example, if the estimated urban unemployment rate is 5%, the actual rate is expected to lie between 4.9% and 5.1%. During specific periods each month, enumerators collect employment and unemployment data from selected households using electronic devices (PADs), reporting directly to the National Bureau of Statistics (NBS) via an online system. The NBS processes the data to estimate both national and provincial urban unemployment rates.

== Data coverage ==
According to the National Bureau of Statistics of China (NBS Website), the unemployment data is compiled based on the Monthly Labor Force Survey, which covers the entire mainland China. The survey does not include data from Hong Kong, Macao, or Taiwan.

== Recent data ==
Urban registered unemployment and unemployment rate in China (1980–2004)
Year	Urban unemployment (10,000 persons)	Unemployment rate (%)	source
1980	541.5	4.9	
1981	439.5	3.8	
1982	379.4	3.2	
1983	271.4	2.3	
1984	235.7	1.9	
1985	238.5	1.8	
1986	264.4	2.0	
1987	276.6	2.0	
1988	296.2	2.0	
1989	377.9	2.6	
1990	383.2	2.5	
1991	352.2	2.3	
1992	363.9	2.3	
1993	420.1	2.6	
1994	476.4	2.8	
1995	519.6	2.9	
1996	552.8	3.0	
1997	576.8	3.1	
1998	571	3.1	
1999	575	3.1	
2000	595	3.1	
2001	681	3.6	
2002	770	4.0	
2003	800	4.3	
2004	827	4.2	

China's urban registered unemployment rate (%), 1980–2021. Data source: National Bureau of Statistics of China.

=== 2005 ===
As of the end of 2005, the total employed population in China was 758.25 million, an increase of 6.25 million from 2004. Of this total, 273.31 million were employed in urban areas, with an increase of 9.7 million and a net increase of 8.55 million. The registered urban unemployment rate was 4.2% at the end of 2005, maintaining the same level as in 2004.

=== 2006 ===
As of the end of 2006, the total employed population in China was 764.00 million, representing a rise of 5.75 million from 2005. Of this total, 283.10 million were employed in urban areas, with an increase of 11.84 million and a net increase of 9.79 million. The registered urban unemployment rate stood at 4.1% at the year end, down by 0.1 percentage point compared to 2005.

=== 2007 ===
As of the end of 2007, the total employed population in China was 769.90 million, marking an increase of 5.90 million over 2006. Of this total, 293.50 million were employed in urban areas, with a net increase of 10.40 million and 12.04 million new jobs created. The registered urban unemployment rate stood at 4.0% at the end of 2007, a decrease of 0.1 percentage point from the previous year.

=== 2008 ===
As of the end of 2008, the total employed population in China was 774.80 million, up by 4.90 million from 2007. Of this total, 302.10 million were employed in urban areas, with a net increase of 8.60 million and 11.13 million new jobs created. The registered urban unemployment rate was 4.2% at the year end, an increase of 0.2 percentage point over 2007.

=== 2009 ===
As of the end of 2009, the total employed population in China was 779.95 million, an increase of 5.15 million over 2008. Of this total, 311.20 million were employed in urban areas, with a net increase of 9.10 million and a total of 11.02 million new jobs created. The registered urban unemployment rate stood at 4.3% at the end of 2009, an increase of 0.1 percentage point compared to the previous year.

=== 2010 ===
As of the end of 2010, 11.68 million new jobs were created in urban areas in China, an increase of 660 thousand over the previous year. The registered urban unemployment rate was 4.1% at the end of 2010, a decrease of 0.2 percentage points from 2009. The total number of migrant workers reached 242.23 million in 2010, an increase of 5.4% over 2009. Among them, 153.35 million were employed outside their hometowns, up by 5.5%, while 88.88 million worked locally, an increase of 5.2%.

=== 2011 ===
As of the end of 2011, the total employed population in China was 764.20 million, with 359.14 million employed in urban areas. During the year, 12.21 million new jobs were created in urban regions. The registered urban unemployment rate stood at 4.1% at the year end, maintaining the same level as 2010. The total number of migrant workers reached 252.78 million in 2011, an increase of 4.4% over 2010. Of these, 158.63 million were employed outside their hometowns, up by 3.4%, while 94.15 million worked locally, an increase of 5.9%.

=== 2012 ===
As of the end of 2012, the total employed population in China was 767.04 million, with 371.02 million employed in urban areas. During the year, 12.66 million new jobs were created in urban regions. The registered urban unemployment rate was 4.1% at the year end, maintaining the same level as 2011. The total number of migrant workers reached 262.61 million in 2012, an increase of 3.9% over 2011. Among them, 163.36 million were employed outside their hometowns, up by 3.0%, while 99.25 million worked locally, an increase of 5.4%.

=== 2013 ===
As of the end of 2013, the total employed population in China was 769.77 million, with 382.40 million employed in urban areas. During the year, 13.10 million new jobs were created in urban regions. The registered urban unemployment rate stood at 4.05% at the year end, slightly lower than the previous year's 4.09%. The total number of migrant workers reached 268.94 million in 2013, an increase of 2.4% over 2012. Among them, 166.10 million were employed outside their hometowns, up by 1.7%, while 102.84 million worked locally, an increase of 3.6%.

=== 2014 ===
As of the end of 2014, the total employed population in China was 772.53 million, with 393.10 million employed in urban areas. During the year, 13.22 million new jobs were created in urban regions. The registered urban unemployment rate was 4.09% at the year end. The total number of migrant workers reached 273.95 million in 2014, an increase of 1.9% over 2013. Of these, 168.21 million were employed outside their hometowns, up by 1.3%, while 105.74 million worked locally, an increase of 2.8%.

=== 2015 ===
As of the end of 2015, the total employed population in China was 774.51 million, with 404.10 million employed in urban areas. During the year, 13.12 million new jobs were created in urban regions. The registered urban unemployment rate stood at 4.05% at the year end. The total number of migrant workers reached 277.47 million in 2015, marking a 1.3% increase over 2014. Among them, 168.84 million were employed outside their hometowns, up by 0.4%, while 108.63 million worked locally, an increase of 2.7%.

=== 2016 ===
As the end of 2016, China's total employed population stood at 776.03 million, with 414.28 million employed in urban areas. That year, urban employment increased by 13.14 million. The registered urban unemployment rate at year-end was 4.02 percent. The total migrant worker population in 2016 reached 281.71 million, marking a 1.5 percent increase over 2015. Within this group, 169.34 million workers were employed outside their hometowns, a growth of 0.3 percent, while 112.37 million were employed locally, showing a 3.4 percent rise.

=== 2017 ===
As of the end of 2017, China's total employed population was 776.40 million, with 424.62 million people working in urban areas. Throughout the year, urban employment grew by 13.51 million, marking an increase of 0.37 million over the previous year. By year-end, the registered urban unemployment rate had decreased to 3.9%, down by 0.12 percentage points from the previous year. The number of migrant workers totaled 286.52 million in 2017, reflecting a 1.7% increase compared to 2016. Among these workers, 171.85 million were employed outside their hometowns, a rise of 1.5%, while 114.67 million worked within their local areas, showing an increase of 2.0%.

=== 2018 ===
As of the end of 2018, the total employed population in China was 775.86 million, with 434.19 million employed in urban areas. During the year, 13.61 million new jobs were created in urban regions, an increase of 0.10 million compared to the previous year. The surveyed unemployment rate in urban areas stood at 4.9% at the end of 2018, 0.1 percentage point lower than the previous year, while the registered unemployment rate was 3.8%, also down by 0.1 percentage point. The total number of migrant workers reached 288.36 million in 2018, an increase of 0.6% over 2017. Of these, 172.66 million were employed outside their hometowns, up by 0.5%, while 115.70 million worked locally, an increase of 0.9%.

Urban Surveyed Unemployment Rate in 2018
Month	The Urban Surveyed Unemployment Rate(%)	The Urban Surveyed Unemployment Rate of the Population Aged from 16 to 24(%)	The Urban Surveyed Unemployment Rate of the Population Aged from 25 to 59(%)	source
January	5.0	11.2	4.4	
February	5.0	11.0	4.5	
March	5.1	10.4	4.6	
April	4.9	10.1	4.4	
May	4.8	9.6	4.4	
June	4.8	10.0	4.4	
July	5.1	13.3	4.4	
August	5.0	13.1	4.3	
September	4.9	11.2	4.3	
October	4.9	9.8	4.4	
November	4.8	10.0	4.4	
December	4.9	10.1	4.4	

=== 2019 ===
As of the end of 2019, the total employed population was 774.71 million, including 442.47 million people employed in urban areas. Urban employment accounted for 57.1% of the national total, an increase of 1.1 percentage points compared to the end of 2018. Throughout the year, 13.52 million new jobs were added in urban areas, a decrease of 90 thousand compared to the previous year. The surveyed urban unemployment rate stood at 5.2% at the end of 2019, while the registered urban unemployment rate was 3.6%. The number of migrant workers nationwide reached 290.77 million, a growth of 0.8% from 2018. Of these, 174.25 million migrant workers were employed outside their hometowns, up by 0.9%, while 116.52 million worked locally, an increase of 0.7%.

Urban Surveyed Unemployment Rate in 2019
Month	The Urban Surveyed Unemployment Rate(%)	The Urban Surveyed Unemployment Rate of the Population Aged from 16 to 24(%)	The Urban Surveyed Unemployment Rate of the Population Aged from 25 to 59(%)	source
January	5.1	11.2	4.6	
February	5.3	11.0	4.9	
March	5.2	11.3	4.8	
April	5.0	9.9	4.7	
May	5.0	10.5	4.5	
June	5.1	11.6	4.6	
July	5.3	13.9	4.6	
August	5.2	13.1	4.5	
September	5.2	13.0	4.6	
October	5.1	12.4	4.6	
November	5.1	12.5	4.6	
December	5.2	12.2	4.7	

=== 2020 ===
As of the end of 2020, the number of newly employed people in urban areas had reached 11.86 million, a decrease of 1.66 million compared to the previous year. The surveyed unemployment rate in urban areas stood at 5.2%, while the registered urban unemployment rate was 4.2% at the end of the year. The total number of migrant workers in 2020 was 285.60 million, representing a decrease of 1.8% from 2019. Of these, 169.59 million were migrant workers employed outside their hometowns, a decline of 2.7%, while 116.01 million worked within their localities, a decrease of 0.4%.

Urban Surveyed Unemployment Rate in 2020
Month	The Urban Surveyed Unemployment Rate(%)	The Urban Surveyed Unemployment Rate of the Population Aged from 16 to 24(%)	The Urban Surveyed Unemployment Rate of the Population Aged from 25 to 59(%)	source
January	5.3	12.5	4.7	
February	6.2	13.6	5.6	
March	5.9	13.3	5.4	
April	6.0	13.8	5.5	
May	5.9	14.8	5.4	
June	5.7	15.4	5.2	
July	5.7	16.8	5.0	
August	5.6	16.8	4.8	
September	5.4	15.0	4.8	
October	5.3	13.2	4.8	
November	5.2	12.8	4.7	
December	5.2	12.3	4.7	

=== 2021 ===
As of the end of 2021, the total employed population stood at 746.52 million, with 467.73 million employed in urban areas, making up 62.7% of the total employed population. This proportion was 1.1 percentage points higher than that at the end of the previous year. In 2021, 12.69 million new jobs were created in urban areas, an increase of 0.83 million compared to the previous year. The average surveyed unemployment rate in urban areas was 5.1% throughout 2021, with the rate at the year's end also at 5.1%, while the registered unemployment rate was 3.96%. The total number of migrant workers reached 292.51 million, up by 2.4% compared to 2020. Among them, 171.72 million migrant workers left their hometowns to work elsewhere, a rise of 1.3%, while 120.79 million worked locally, an increase of 4.1%.

Urban Surveyed Unemployment Rate in 2021
Month	The Urban Surveyed Unemployment Rate(%)	The Urban Surveyed Unemployment Rate of the Population Aged from 16 to 24(%)	The Urban Surveyed Unemployment Rate of the Population Aged from 25 to 59(%)	source
January	5.4	12.7	4.9	
February	5.5	13.1	5.0	
March	5.3	13.6	4.8	
April	5.1	13.6	4.6	
May	5.0	13.8	4.4	
June	5.0	15.4	4.2	
July	5.1	16.2	4.2	
August	5.1	15.3	4.3	
September	4.9	14.6	4.2	
October	4.9	14.2	4.2	
November	5.0	14.3	4.3	
December	5.1	14.3	4.4	

=== 2022 ===
As of the end of 2022, the total employed population was 733.51 million, of which 459.31 million were employed in urban areas, accounting for 62.6% of the total employed population. In 2022, 12.06 million new jobs were created in urban areas, a decrease of 0.63 million compared to the previous year. The average surveyed unemployment rate in urban areas for 2022 was 5.6%, while the rate at the end of the year stood at 5.5%. The total number of migrant workers reached 295.62 million, reflecting an increase of 1.1% over 2021. Of these, 171.90 million were employed outside their hometowns, a slight rise of 0.1%, while 123.72 million worked locally, an increase of 2.4%.

Urban Surveyed Unemployment Rate in 2022
Month	The Urban Surveyed Unemployment Rate(%)	The Urban Surveyed Unemployment Rate of the Population Aged from 16 to 24(%)	The Urban Surveyed Unemployment Rate of the Population Aged from 25 to 59(%)	Average Weekly Working Hours of Urban Employees in Enterprises(hour)	source
January	5.3	15.3	4.6	47.5	
February	5.5	15.3	4.8	46.7	
March	5.8	16.0	5.2	47.3	
April	6.1	18.2	5.3	46.2	
May	5.9	18.4	5.1	47.2	
June	5.5	19.3	4.5	47.7	
July	5.4	19.9	4.3	48.0	
August	5.3	18.7	4.3	48.0	
September	5.5	17.9	4.7	47.8	
October	5.5	17.9	4.7	47.9	
November	5.7	17.1	5.0	47.7	
December	5.5	16.7	4.8	47.9	

In March 2022, due to the intensification of the COVID-19 outbreak in certain regions, the recovery of production and business activities was affected. Sectors such as construction, transportation, accommodation and catering, wholesale and retail, residential services, and cultural tourism were significantly impacted, leading to a weakening in labor demand. As a result, the urban surveyed unemployment rate rose to 5.8%, an increase of 0.3 percentage points compared to the previous month. The unemployment rate for the primary working-age group (adults aged 25–59) increased by 0.4 percentage points from the previous month, reaching 5.2%. Among key groups, the unemployment rate of migrant workers with rural household registration, who typically return to the labor market after the Spring Festival, rose by 0.7 percentage points from January to 5.6% in February. In March, due to the ongoing impact of the pandemic, the unemployment rate of this group continued to rise, reaching 5.9%, exceeding the overall urban unemployment rate for two consecutive months.

=== 2023 ===
As of the end of 2023, the total number of employed people in China was 740.41 million, with 470.32 million in urban areas, representing 63.5% of the total employed population. Throughout 2023, 12.44 million new jobs were created in urban areas, an increase of 0.38 million compared to the previous year. The average surveyed urban unemployment rate was 5.2% in 2023, while the rate at the end of the year was 5.1%. The total number of migrant workers reached 297.53 million, an increase of 0.6% over 2022. Among them, 176.58 million were employed outside their hometowns, up by 2.7%, while 120.95 million worked locally, a decrease of 2.2%.

Urban Surveyed Unemployment Rate in 2023
Month	The Urban Surveyed Unemployment Rate(%)	The Urban Surveyed Unemployment Rate of the Population Aged from 16 to 24(%)	The Urban Surveyed Unemployment Rate of the Population Aged from 25 to 59(%)	Average Weekly Working Hours of Urban Employees in Enterprises(hour)	source
January	5.5	17.3	4.7	47.9	
February	5.6	18.1	4.8	47.9	
March	5.3	19.6	4.3	48.7	
April	5.2	20.4	4.2	48.8	
May	5.2	20.8	4.1	48.6	
June	5.2	21.3	4.1	48.7	
July	5.3	unreleased	unreleased	48.7	
August	5.2	unreleased	unreleased	48.7	
September	5.0	unreleased	unreleased	48.8	
October	5.0	unreleased	unreleased	48.7	
November	5.0	unreleased	unreleased	48.9	
December	5.1	unreleased	unreleased	49.0	

=== 2024 ===
Since December 2023, the National Bureau of Statistics of China has adopted a new method for calculating unemployment rates. Under this approach, the unemployment rate for the labor force aged 16 to 24 no longer includes students currently enrolled in school, aiming to provide a more accurate reflection of the actual employment situation. Additionally, for the labor force aged 25 to 59, the bureau has further segmented the unemployment rate into two sub-groups: the unemployment rate for those aged 25 to 29 and the unemployment rate for those aged 30 to 59, with data released separately for each group.

As of the end of 2024, the total number of employed people in China was 734.39 million, with 473.45 million in urban areas, representing 64.5% of the total employed population. Throughout 2024, 12.56 million new jobs were created in urban areas, an increase of 0.12 million compared to the previous year. The average surveyed urban unemployment rate was 5.1% in 2024, while the rate at the end of the year was also 5.1%. The total number of migrant workers reached 299.73 million, an increase of 0.7% over 2023. Among them, 178.71 million were employed outside their hometowns, up by 1.2%, while 121.02 million worked locally, up by 0.1%.

Urban Surveyed Unemployment Rate in 2024
Month	The Urban Surveyed Unemployment Rate(%)	The Urban Surveyed Unemployment Rate of the Population Aged from 16 to 24 Excluding Students(%)	The Urban Surveyed Unemployment Rate of the Population Aged from 25 to 29 Excluding Students(%)	The Urban Surveyed Unemployment Rate of the Population Aged from 30 to 59 Excluding Students(%)	Average Weekly Working Hours of Urban Employees in Enterprises(hour)	source
January	5.2	14.6	6.2	4.1	49.0	
February	5.3	15.3	6.4	4.2	48.0	
March	5.2	15.3	7.2	4.1	48.6	
April	5.0	14.7	7.1	4.0	48.5	
May	5.0	14.2	6.6	4.0	48.7	
June	5.0	13.2	6.4	4.0	48.6	
July	5.2	17.1	6.5	3.9	48.7	
August	5.3	18.8	6.9	3.9	48.7	
September	5.1	17.6	6.7	3.9	48.8	
October	5.0	17.1	6.8	3.8	48.6	
November	5.0	16.1	6.7	3.8	48.9	
December	5.1	15.7	6.6	3.9	49.0	

== Causes ==
China's unemployment trends are influenced by globalization, technological advancements, and industrial restructuring. As China has integrated into the global market, its manufacturing and export-oriented industries have become central to its economy. However, global economic fluctuations and changes in demand directly impact employment in these sectors. For instance, increased import competition has been linked to significant labor market disruptions in developed economies, highlighting the sensitivity of employment to global trade dynamics.

Technological innovation and automation have also played a role in shaping China's labor market. The adoption of advanced manufacturing technologies has led to a reduced demand for low-skilled labor, as machines and automated systems replace human workers in certain tasks. Studies have shown that automation can lead to job displacement in manufacturing enterprises, particularly affecting low-skilled positions, while potentially creating opportunities for high-skilled labor.

Additionally, China's efforts to adjust its industrial structure—from traditional manufacturing to high-tech and service industries—have contributed to unemployment trends. This transition often results in a mismatch between the skills of the existing workforce and the requirements of emerging industries, leading to structural unemployment. Research indicates that such industrial upgrading can have significant implications for employment, necessitating policies that address skill development and labor market flexibility.

== Rural labor migration and urban unemployment ==
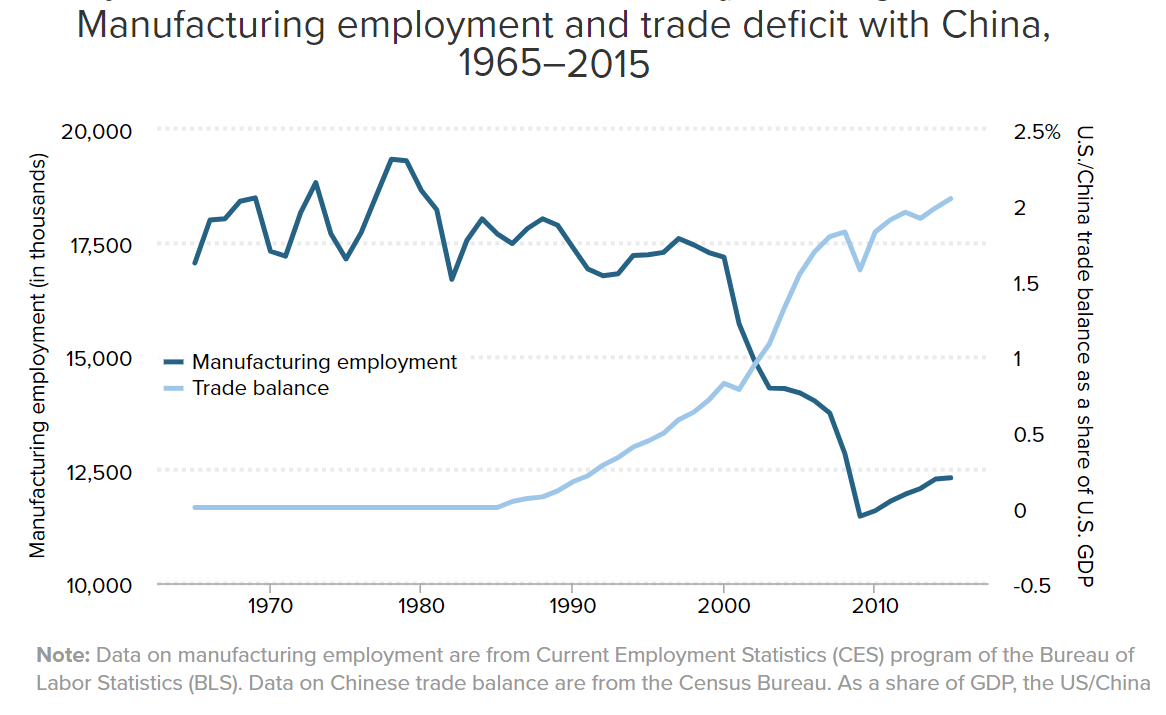
Manufacturing employment and trade deficit with China, 1965-2015

The unemployment rates of every country throughout the world are strongly correlated with gross domestic product and rural and urban labor. According to a 2017 economic study, official government statistics show that unemployment in China is unusually low relative to gross domestic product and suspiciously stable. China's labor market was highly regulated and dominated by state-owned enterprises, with an average unemployment rate of 3.7 per cent between 1988 and 1995, but this rose sharply after numerous lay-offs between 1995 and 2002, a period commonly referred to as Xiagang (下岗), reaching an average unemployment rate of 9.5 per cent between 2002 and 2009. These changes had the greatest impact on non-technical workers from rural area, particularly less educated women and younger workers. Lastly, estimates of unemployment and labor force participation rates were provided for all urban residents, including migrants without a registered permanent residence. As of 2018, the total number of registered migrant workers stands at around 288.4 million.

In 2002, economists Fan Zhai and Zhi Wang simulated China's economy following its accession to the World Trade Organization. The study concluded that there was a need for coordination between China's rural-urban migration policy, labor market reform, and trade liberalization measures. This action would not only prevent a deterioration in urban unemployment, but also increase the flexibility of the labor market to create more employment opportunities for rural unskilled labor workers from the agricultural sector.

== Impact of the 2008 financial crisis on unemployment ==
2007-2009 World Financial Crisis

Many migrant workers returned to their homes following the 2008 financial crisis. The 2008 financial crisis resulted in reduced consumer demand in developed countries while export orders for Chinese goods declined. During the 2008 financial crisis, prices fell sharply, businesses and consumers were unable to repay their debts, and financial institutions ran short of liquidity. Migrant workers, who were already socially and legally marginalized from the precarious nature of their employment, experienced increased poverty. At the beginning of 2009, the number of unemployed immigrants exceeded 20 million, accounting for about 40% of the total population who lost their jobs. In the months following August 2008, China's export orders declined sharply, especially in coast cities. Most businesses within the Pearl River Delta Economic Zone closed. This resulted in poor job opportunities for college graduates, which further decreased labor force participation rates. However, the government provided assistance to the unemployed and was responsible for stabilizing the unemployment situation of urban registered permanent residents to increase employment opportunities.

== State capacity and governance issues to address unemployment ==
To mitigate unemployment and support labor market stability, the Chinese government has introduced various policy measures, notably unemployment insurance, vocational training, and reemployment programs. These policies aim to cushion the impact of job loss and facilitate workforce adaptation to economic restructuring and technological advancements.

=== Unemployment Insurance ===
Unemployment insurance (UI) in China, a system introduced during the 1990s reform and opening up, has evolved to offer financial support to involuntarily unemployed workers while they seek new employment. UI aids in stabilizing household consumption and fosters social stability, primarily benefiting urban areas where layoffs are more common due to industrial shifts. Besides providing a financial cushion, UI encourages an efficient labor allocation process by allowing job seekers adequate time to find roles that align with their skills, ultimately reducing labor market volatility. Unemployment insurance (UI) not only provides immediate financial assistance to individuals but also indirectly supports regional economies by sustaining consumer demand during economic downturns. Studies have shown that UI can alleviate poverty and reduce economic inequality, contributing to stability in communities with high unemployment rates. Research indicates that by supporting basic living standards, UI helps prevent extreme poverty among urban populations, particularly in regions facing economic vulnerabilities.

==== Vocational Training Programs ====
In response to growing skill mismatches amid rapid industrial and technological advancements, the Chinese government has heavily invested in vocational training. These programs aim to improve the employability of displaced workers, specifically targeting skills required in expanding sectors like automation and service industries. Research indicates that such training significantly enhances reemployment prospects by equipping workers with relevant skills, effectively reducing structural unemployment. China's labor market is undergoing profound structural changes, showing new characteristics of task structure transformation. Further research shows that vocational training has played an important role in this transformation, not only improving workers' employability, but also promoting labor market flexibility, enabling recession-affected regions to transfer labor to high-demand emerging industries, thereby alleviating the government's fiscal pressure. By adapting to task-biased technological progress and helping workers acquire new skills that match technological changes, these programs not only improve individuals' re-employment ability, but also enhance the adaptability of the labor market to economic structural adjustments.

==== Job Stability Plan for Migrant Workers ====
In alignment with urbanization initiatives, the Chinese government introduced a five-year action plan to enhance job stability for migrant workers, incorporating supportive policies and targeted training. The plan incentivizes companies to retain employees by providing partial refunds on unemployment insurance contributions for those with low-layoff rates. Additionally, a national public employment platform and specialized training programs are designed to connect workers with sectors experiencing high demand, such as intelligent manufacturing and domestic services. The Ministry of Human Resources and Social Security has also expanded an occupational injury insurance pilot program for new employment types, such as the platform economy, which, as of June 2024, covered nearly 9 million workers across seven provinces.

Despite the high level of economic growth, the restructuring of China's economy has resulted in an increase in urban unemployment over the past decade, resulting in civil unrest in many cities. Since 1986, and especially since 1997, the central government's policy on unemployment has focused on helping cities and towns register the unemployed and "laid-off workers" through unemployment insurance, reemployment service centers and employment services such as training and employment assistance. These efforts are aimed at controlling layoffs and job creation in state-owned enterprises by stimulating economic growth.

At the same time, the Chinese government has promoted employment and industrial structure through boosting the national economy, adjusting the economic structure, advancing the reform of the political and economic system, balancing urban and rural economic development, and continuously increasing the social security system. The government has also used monetary policy, taxation and fiscal policy to reduce unemployment. The goal of such policy was to incentivize self-employment, the creation of new businesses, and medium/small enterprises (SMEs) hiring more workers. The government provided small loans and interest subsidies to support SME development for the sake of expanding employment.

Lastly, the government actively cultivates and develops the labor market. From the late 1990s onward, the Chinese government has attempted to build a scientific, standardized, and modernized labor market, and constructed a public employment service system. "All levels of [the] public employment service would provide free job placement and employment guidance to the urban unemployed and rural migrant workers. Providing a "one-stop" service ranging from registration of laid-off and unemployed population looking for jobs, job placement, social insurance coverage, and vocational skill training".

== Youth unemployment ==
The youth unemployment rate in China is worth noting due to young workers representing a significant proportion of China's workforce. During 2004 to 2009, it was easy for a low-skilled young workers to find jobs; however, due to economic stagnation, young workers today may face increasing difficulties in seeking or maintaining jobs. Jobs accessible to young workers tend to be precarious, with low wages and lacking social security benefits such as unemployment welfare and insurance. At the same time, many graduates cannot compete for jobs with top university graduates, they are not willing to take low-quality, low-paid jobs. Business professors Terence Tse and Mark Esposito (2014) consider some of these young people to be NEETs. Tse and Esposito suggest that some parents encourage their children remain unemployed and find better jobs, rather than accept the low-quality jobs that the parents already have. As anti-hustle trends gained momentum in China in 2023, Gen-Z youths began opting for lower paying occupations as valid, less stressful career paths even though they were once considered low-quality.

Youth unemployment can also be attributed to structural unemployment, which occurs when there is a mismatch between the skills that jobs require and the skills that workers possess. According to research by Zhao and Huang (2010), there were 750,000 college graduates who could not find a job in 2003 after graduating in 1999, which increased to 1.2 million in 2005, and nearly 2 million in 2009 (approximately 32% of the total 6.1 million graduates that year). The real numbers might be higher than official data due to the minimum standard of a 70% employment rate and possibly fraudulent reporting by the Ministry of Education. Job search success for college graduates often depends on the reputation of the university. For example, students who graduate from prestigious universities in China can often easily find high salary jobs, in contrast to graduates from less prestigious universities. This may be reflective of academic disparity, where academic conditions such as faculty and environment of top universities are better than those of unknown universities. The difficulty and competitiveness of university admission also exacerbate the problem by limiting education for high school graduates.

Since 2018, China's youth unemployment rate has increased significantly, peaking at 20.8 percent in May 2022. Youth unemployment has stayed elevated since early 2022 as Covid disruptions and a property slump added to already existing structural problems in the labor market. On August 15, 2023, the National Bureau of Statistics of China (NBS) announced the cessation of publishing the youth unemployment rate. In July of 2023, the National Bureau of Statistics of China announced that the youth unemployment rate was as at 21.3%.

Numerous sources considered this decision to be tantamount to a deliberate coverup of information related to the youth unemployment data point, and a troubling sign for the state of the overall Chinese economy, with The New York Times reporting in August of 2023, "Beijing stopped releasing youth unemployment figures in its latest attempt to play down negative trends as growth stalls, and global concerns grow...", and that, "The decision may be temporary, but it will only make it harder for investors to know what's happening in the country — and that may be the point." The NBS started releasing youth unemployment numbers in January 2024, and announced the new number excluded students.
