= Xenotransplantation (journal) =

- Discipline: Xenotransplantation
- Language: English
- Edited by: Leo H. Bühler

Publication details
- History: 1998-present
- Publisher: Wiley-Blackwell
- Frequency: Bimonthly

Standard abbreviations
- ISO 4: Xenotransplantation

Indexing
- ISSN: 0908-665X (print); 1399-3089 (web)
- LCCN: 00242183
- OCLC no.: 1043659829

Links
- Journal homepage; Online access; Online archive

Xenotransplantation is a bimonthly peer-reviewed medical journal covering xenotransplantation. It is published by Wiley-Blackwell and the editor-in-chief is Leo H. Bühler (University of Fribourg). The annual Carl-Gustav Groth Xeno Prize of US$7,000 is presented to the first author of the best article published in the journal.

The journal exhibited unusual levels of self-citation and its journal impact factor of 2019 was suspended from Journal Citation Reports in 2020, a sanction which hit 34 journals in total.
