= Xuzhou No.32 Middle School homicide =

2012 school killing in China

The Xuzhou No.32 Middle School homicide (徐州第三十二中学杀人事件), also known as the Xuzhou No.32 Middle School stabbing, was a homicide that took place inside the No.32 Middle School (formerly known as No.2 Railway Middle School) in Xuzhou on February 13, 2012. One student was killed, and the school was accused of failing to save the victim, Xiangyu Wang, a 9th grader attending No.32 Middle School. He died from the incident at the age of 15.

== See also ==
- List of attacks related to secondary schools
- Social issues in China
