= Social issues in China =

Social issues in the People's Republic of China are wide-ranging, and are often a combined result of the reform and opening up set in place in the late 1970s, the nation's political and cultural history, and an immense population. Some of these issues are exposed by the Chinese media, while subjects that may contain politically sensitive issues for the Chinese Communist Party (CCP) are censored. Some academics hold that the People's Republic of China's fragile social balance, combined with a bubble economy makes it a very unstable country, while others argue China's societal trends have created a balance to sustain itself.

== Overview ==
According to Professor Jianrong, official statistics show the number of recorded incidents of mass unrest are "boiling ... to the point of explosion". They have risen from 8,709 in 1993 to more than 90,000 in each 2007 through 2009. Reasons cited include an aggrieved class of dispossessed migrants and unemployed workers, a deep loss of faith in the system among many Chinese, and a weakening in the traditional means of state control.

Professor Hu Xingdou from Beijing University of Technology stated that corruption, state monopolies, the widening wealth gap, and increasing costs of housing, education, and medical care all significantly contribute to unrest. He identified land seizures and the growing wealth disparity as the top two factors, noting that since the start of Deng Xiaoping's reforms in 1979, the disparity between urban and rural populations has increased from 2.56:1 in 1978 to 3.33:1 in 2009.

Urban income in 1978 was 343 yuan whilst rural income stood at 134 yuan; in 2009, the corresponding figures were 17,175 yuan and 5,153 yuan respectively. Despite the overall increase in urban income, unemployment, unpaid wages, and police misconduct are sources of grievance. Corruption is a very big issue in China.

== Regional imbalances ==
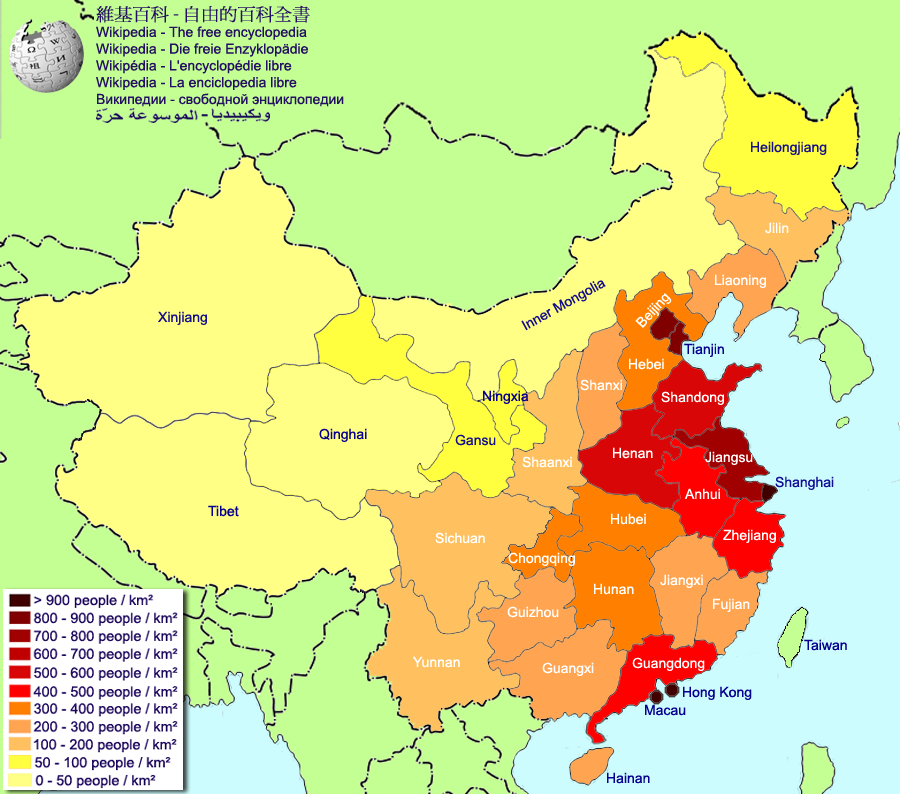
China's wealth and population is concentrated in the Eastern coastal provinces

- Rural-urban disparity and the wealth gap

Since the reform and opening up in China began, income inequality has increased significantly. The Gini Coefficient, an income distribution gauge, has worsened from 0.3 back in 1986 to 0.42 in 2011. Poverty researchers recognize anything above 0.4 as potentially socially destabilizing.

The growing wealth gap can be seen as a byproduct of China's economic and social development policies. The reform and opening up were carried out in two stages. The first stage, in the late 1970s and early 1980s, involved the de-collectivization of agriculture, the opening up of the country to foreign investment, and permission for entrepreneurs to start businesses. A large percentage of industries still remained state-owned. The second stage of reform, in the late 1980s and 1990s, involved the privatization and contracting out of much state-owned industry. The 1985 lifting of price controls was a major reform, and the lifting of protectionist policies and regulations soon followed, although state monopolies in the commanding heights of the economy such as banking and petroleum remained. These reforms may have resulted in the adverse effects of having a widening inequity between the rich and the poor which subsequently may cause social and political instability, discrimination in access to areas such as public health, education, pensions and unequal opportunities for the Chinese people.

The inequality in income in China can also be seen as a rural-urban income gap especially with the widely criticized social development policy, the Hukou (household registration) System in place. Market income – mainly wages – has been the driving factor in shaping urban income inequality since the reform and opening up in China while the widening rural-urban income gap is due to low salaries for employees and migrants in many companies coupled with rapidly growing profits for the management of State-owned enterprises, real estate developers and some private companies. The urban per capita net income stood at 17,175 yuan ($2,525) in 2009, in contrast to 5,153 yuan in the countryside, with the urban-to-rural income ratio being 3.33:1, according to figures from the National Bureau of Statistics.

The Hukou System has been long seen as an institutionalized source of inequality and disparity among the population and source of population control seen a deterrence factor for rural citizens to seek a higher standard of living in the cities as rural citizens will be denied access to urban housing and education for their children. It is also seen as a legacy of the dualistic economy, serving as a highly effective measure of limiting urban migration.

- Coastal-hinterland imbalance
- Digital divide

== Employment ==
Employment distribution has been an important issue for the Chinese Government ever since it began initiating reforms. The previous state-led system of employment has been restructured to accommodate the market economy. Its negative effects include the massive layoffs and the cracks to the household registration system, which sent many rural Chinese to seek employment in the cities. These factors gave rise to the competitive labor force and unemployment. Employment levels differ from region to region, with stronger concentrations of unemployment in the interior.

The unemployment trend is attributed in part to the efforts of the Chinese Government to make its SOEs (State Owned Enterprises), which had a redundancy rate at an estimated 25-30% in 1999, more efficient. These reforms culminated in the widespread layoffs of SOE workers during the period known as xiagang (下岗), which dramatically increased urban unemployment and reshaped China's labor market. However, unemployment elsewhere causes millions to leave home in the rural areas. By the end of 2009, for instance, 120 million workers, who lost their jobs due to the global economic crisis that affected China's manufacturing industry, trooped to areas such as Guangdong to find better opportunities. The government's recent response to the unemployment problem has been viewed favorably because of a shift in perspective. Today, the state approaches the issue, not as a political problem but a socio-economic problem that require socio-economic solutions. China's legal system is facing the intricate challenges posed by the political and social dynamics resulting from its rapid economic expansion. A significant issue within contemporary China revolves around the treatment of workers within the framework of a capitalist economy operating within a socialist political system.

There are also related social problems to unemployment. These include the fact that the country's social insurance system is considered within the primitive stage of development, exposing employees to further problems in cases when the government allows the companies they work for to be liquidated.

== Crime ==
- Increase in corporate irregularity a.k.a. white-collar crime.
- Close tie between organized crime and corruption.
- Allegations of counterfeiting.
- Increased instances of alleged fraud and scams (including people claiming supernatural powers, quack medicines, etc.)
- The resurgence of Chinese organized crime.

== Social unrest ==
- Media censorship
- Dissatisfaction with corrupt government officials.
- Large protests against local government/businesses due to unfair treatment (usually land and expropriation-related issues) and ensuing persecution.
- Homeowners refuse to repay loans on unfinished properties.

== Discrimination ==
=== Regional discrimination ===
- Regional elitism (mainly in Beijing and Shanghai)

=== Gender discrimination ===
Since the establishment of the Chinese constitution, gender equality gained unprecedented importance for the Chinese state. Their efforts were focused towards extending women's rights politically, economically, culturally and socially. For example, throughout the past few decades China integrated a series of laws and programs forbidding sex-selective abortions, protecting mothers' rights, improving the livelihood of girls, and criminalizing discriminatory employer practices. However, despite being a pillar of their constitution, gender equality failed to translate as effectively in practice.

In multiple sectors of Chinese society women still face discrimination. First, the employment sector reveals several mechanisms disadvantaging women from an equal position in the work force. Notably, the rising wage gap, the reproduction of stereotypes in job opportunities, the confinement of women to lower paid posts, and the unfair practices of penalizing women for motherhood duties. The gender wage gap remains a tough struggle for China to conquer, with studies showing its continued rise rather than its decline – especially amongst lower income groups. This is partly due to the restricted employment opportunities offered to women – notably, their limitation to lower level administrative and sales jobs–, and to their greater lack of education. Additionally, while men are hired for their experience, women are employed for their youth, height, and attractiveness; consequently, further limiting them to stereotypical career choices. Furthermore, despite it being illegal, employers refuse to recruit women to avoid child bearing costs, or even fire women over their "inefficiency" during pregnancies. Similarly, the family sector reveals countless instances of discrimination against women in China. For starters, China still suffers from excess female child mortality, as a result of the one child policy and sex-selective abortions, which favor sons over daughters. Although the practice is illegal, sons provide a greater cultural and economic advantage for Chinese families: they carry the family lineage, they support parents in old-age, and they generally dominate the family power structure. Additionally, even when daughters are born, they still face gender inequalities. Using Engel's curve, scholars measured the extent to which food shares per family rise during a male versus a female birth, and found that they increase significantly more for sons than daughters; thus, signaling the family's greater care and importance for male than female offsprings. The discrimination of women continues to be an important social issue for China to overcome, and is continuously affected by cultural, political, and economic factors.

Culturally, Confucianism has had an important impact in establishing women as "subservient", and men as dominant patriarchal figures. Politically, since the establishment of communist China, women have become valued as equals through the constitution. Economically, however, reforms have weakened the state's presence in the market, and consequently, also weakened their protection over women's rights. Thus, while political attempts have been made to empower women, cultural and economic traditions fuel gender discrimination in China. However, while many authors highlight the evidence for gender inequality, other scholars find opposite results claiming that Chinese society does not favor men. These contradicting claims are likely due to the complex nature of measuring gender discrimination; specifically, not accounting for factors such as: location, sector, or biological differences.

Lastly, Chinese society has a loud community of women's rights and feminist activists fighting against gender inequalities. Feminists in China speak out on issues of violence against women, employment inequalities, and discriminatory Chinese traditions and policies. Despite Chinese censorship laws, activists remain motivated to challenge gender discrimination, by relying on online social protests. For instance, in 2018 more than 30 million Chinese citizens participated in the #MeToo movement on social media platforms in order to raise awareness against sexual harassment. Thus, the internet has become an important tool for Chinese society to fight against gender discrimination, and eradicate this social issue.

== Educational pressure ==
- Common with other East Asian countries is the extreme pressure from friends, family, and society to perform well in extremely competitive schools, (especially in Gaokao, the university entrance exams) this can result in unethical behaviour performed by parents or students (bribery, cheating, etc. to get into best schools)
- Rural-urban inequality
- Lack of strong relationship between state-funded research and the private sector, e.g. poor commercialization and technology transfer of university research
- Lack of critical scholarship and monitoring of research quality
- Higher Education System is challenged by the transition of economy system in China (from controlled economy to market economy), the methods of production (from diversified to intensive), the conflicts between ancient Chinese cultures, modern Chinese cultures and western cultures. Students are often barred from higher education because the right of admission of a large number of universities is held by most educational administrative departments and local authorities. In addition, Students and Faculties in Higher Education disregard academic duty while demanding for more academic freedom due to the lack of effective regulations.

== Homelessness ==
In 2011, the Chinese Ministry of Civil Affairs reported that homeless adults were assisted around 2.41 million times, and homeless children were assisted around 179,000 times. In 2024, the ministry reported that there were 1,559 relief management agencies, 78,000 beds, and that homeless people were assisted 671,000 times.

== Morality ==
- Perceived loss of traditional Confucian morals and beliefs
- Inflexible ideologies taught in public
- Conflicting reports of excessive materialism
- Discrepancy between the free market and the lack of liberal individualism grounded in law in accordance to socialist ideology

== See also ==
- Fuerdai
