= Edward J. Groth =

Edward John Groth III (born 1946) is an American astrophysicist known for his work on the cosmological distribution of galaxies and in the development of the Hubble Space Telescope.

== Early life and education ==
Born in 1946 in St. Louis, Missouri, Groth moved to Scottsdale, Arizona, for his high-school years. He won several state mathematics competitions and was also active in sports, playing on the varsity tennis team. Influenced by his father, who had been a chemistry and physics major and worked at Oak Ridge National Laboratory, Groth had an early interest in becoming a physicist. He was accepted to Caltech under an early decision plan.

Groth completed a B.S. in physics at Caltech in 1968, then began Ph.D. studies at Princeton, earning his Ph.D. in three years. His Ph.D. thesis on the Crab Nebula Pulsar aimed to establish absolute time references for testing Einstein's theory of relativity and searching for gravitational wave emissions. After a year as an instructor, he became a junior faculty member at Princeton in 1972, was granted tenure in 1978, and remained at Princeton for the rest of his career.

== Academic service ==
Groth's teaching contributions at Princeton cover a wide range of undergraduate and graduate courses within the physics department. He served as the associate chair of the physics department for eight years and participated in numerous University committees. He became a faculty adviser in Rockefeller College at 1987. He has represented Princeton on the Universities Space Research Association (USRA).

== Research ==
Collaborating with colleagues, including Paul Horowitz of Harvard, Groth published a paper in 1971 comparing pulse arrival times from the Crab Nebula recorded by four different observatories, finding a consensus among their data.

During the 1970s, Edward Groth and Jim Peebles initiated an effort in cosmological N-body simulations, treating galaxies, each containing billions of stars, as massive point-like particles interacting gravitationally. This work laid the foundation for much subsequent research.

Simultaneously, in the mid-1970s, Groth and Peebles, along with other collaborators, embarked on a project to analyze the spatial distribution of galaxies based on extensive astronomical surveys. Their research extended into the late 1980s, during which they produced large-scale maps using data from the Lick Observatory’s galaxy catalog. A rendition of their work appeared on the cover of Stewart Brand’s The Next Whole Earth Catalog. Such surveys have since become a cornerstone of scientific exploration, as exemplified by the Sloan Digital Sky Survey's comprehensive map.

In the late 1970s, Groth took a role as the data and operations team leader for the Hubble Space Telescope project, which launched in 1990. He was deputy principal investigator for the Wide Field and Planetary Camera, contributing to the resolution of initial challenges faced by the Hubble telescope. His achievements includes the design of the "Extended Groth Strip," a region adjacent to the Big Dipper's handle, which has identified approximately 50,000 galaxies, and continues to be a focal point of many astronomical observations.

In one of their early analyses of the Groth Strip, Groth, his student Jason Rhodes, and colleague Alexandre Refregier, achieved the first space-based detection of "weak gravitational lensing" in galaxies, a phenomenon explained by Einstein's general theory of relativity.

Starting in 1999, Groth, along with Paul Horowitz, Dave Wilkinson, and Norm Jarosik, engaged in the "Optical SETI" project, focusing on optical signals from potential extraterrestrial civilizations. No extraterrestrial signals were detected.

Groth retired to emeritus status at Princeton in 2018.

== Software development ==
Groth was known as an accomplished computer software developer. His contributions include developing GPLOT, an early plotting package for Fortran, which he made freely available to others. Additionally, he designed fonts at a time when such resources were scarce.

Groth played a crucial role in establishing the digital archive for the Hubble Space Telescope. He was also instrumental in writing some of the initial programs used to deconvolve the distorted images captured by the Hubble Telescope after its launch. His efforts in scientific computation significantly contributed to keeping the Princeton group at the forefront of their field for many years.

== Honors and other activities ==
Groth was an Alfred P. Sloan Foundation fellow (1973–1975) and an elected fellow of the American Association for the Advancement of Science. In 1992 he received the NASA Medal for Exceptional Science Achievement.

He has been a consultant for Cornell Technical Services, American Cash Exchange, TRW, and Princeton Telecommunications.

== Personal ==
Groth was sometimes considered gruff, but he was known for his generosity in sharing his work. Following a heart attack, he turned to cycling with great enthusiasm, engaging in frequent multiday rides and organizing two annual bike trips for his department colleagues. Additionally, his passion for softball earned him the affectionate nickname "the Babe Ruth of the Degenerate Neutron Stars" among his friends.
