= Camilla Groth =

Norwegian poet

Camilla Groth (born 1973) is a Norwegian poet.

Her debut collection Nature Boy was published by Cappelen Damm in 2008. Hysj followed from the same publisher in 2013 and received a moderate review in Klassekampen, as did Et sted der ute er jeg lykkelig (2015), which was released by Flamme forlag, also reviewed by Klassekampen and Dagsavisen. In 2020, she published Rundt jorda. En sonettekrans, again with Cappelen Damm.

Groth has also translated works by Nordic essayists and poets, including Inger Christensen and Kristina Lugn.
