= AEGIS: Guardian of the Fleet =

1994 video game

- Developer: Software Sorcery
- Publisher: Time Warner Interactive
- Platform: MS-DOS
- Release: 1994
- Modes: Single-player, multiplayer

Aegis: Guardian of the Fleet is a video game for MS-DOS compatible operating systems published in 1994 by Time Warner Interactive.

== Gameplay ==
It simulates command of a US Navy Ticonderoga class cruiser using the Aegis combat system, a US Navy radar and computer system which operates intelligence and missile guidance functions. It was developed by Microplay Software, and published by Time Warner Interactive.

Players are given the ability to operate this ship in real-time, either from the bridge, or by viewing ship operations on radar, via the Tactical Plot System. Players can also command several ships at once.

Players can play single mission games, or play a full campaign. The game depicts missions in the Middle East against a variety of targets, and with several different mission objectives.

== Reception ==
Computer Gaming World in July 1994 rated AEGIS: Guardian of the Fleet 3.5 stars out of five. While criticizing the documentation and bugs, the magazine approved of the more than 100 missions, and predicted that like Falcon 3.0 consumers would upgrade computers to play it.
