= Jens Groth =

Danish cryptography researcher

Jens Groth is a cryptographer known for his work on pairing-based cryptography and zero-knowledge proofs. He received a PhD in computer science from Aarhus University, and was at one time Professor of Cryptology at University College London. He is now Chief Scientist at Nexus.

== Research ==
Groth's 2016 paper, On the size of pairing-based non-interactive arguments, described a succinct, noninteractive zero-knowledge proof scheme based on pairings, commonly referred to as "Groth16". It is quite compact, with proofs consisting of just three group elements. The construction is used in several cryptocurrency protocols, such as Zcash and Tornado Cash. A subsequent work by Helger Lipmaa showed that even smaller proofs are possible, reducing proof sizes from 1792 bits to 1408 bits for practical parameters.

== Awards ==
- International Association for Cryptologic Research Test-of-Time Award (2021)
- International Association for Cryptologic Research Test-of-Time Award (2023)
