= AEGIS (astronomy) =

Astronomical survey

- Alternative names: All-Wavelength Extended Groth Strip International Survey

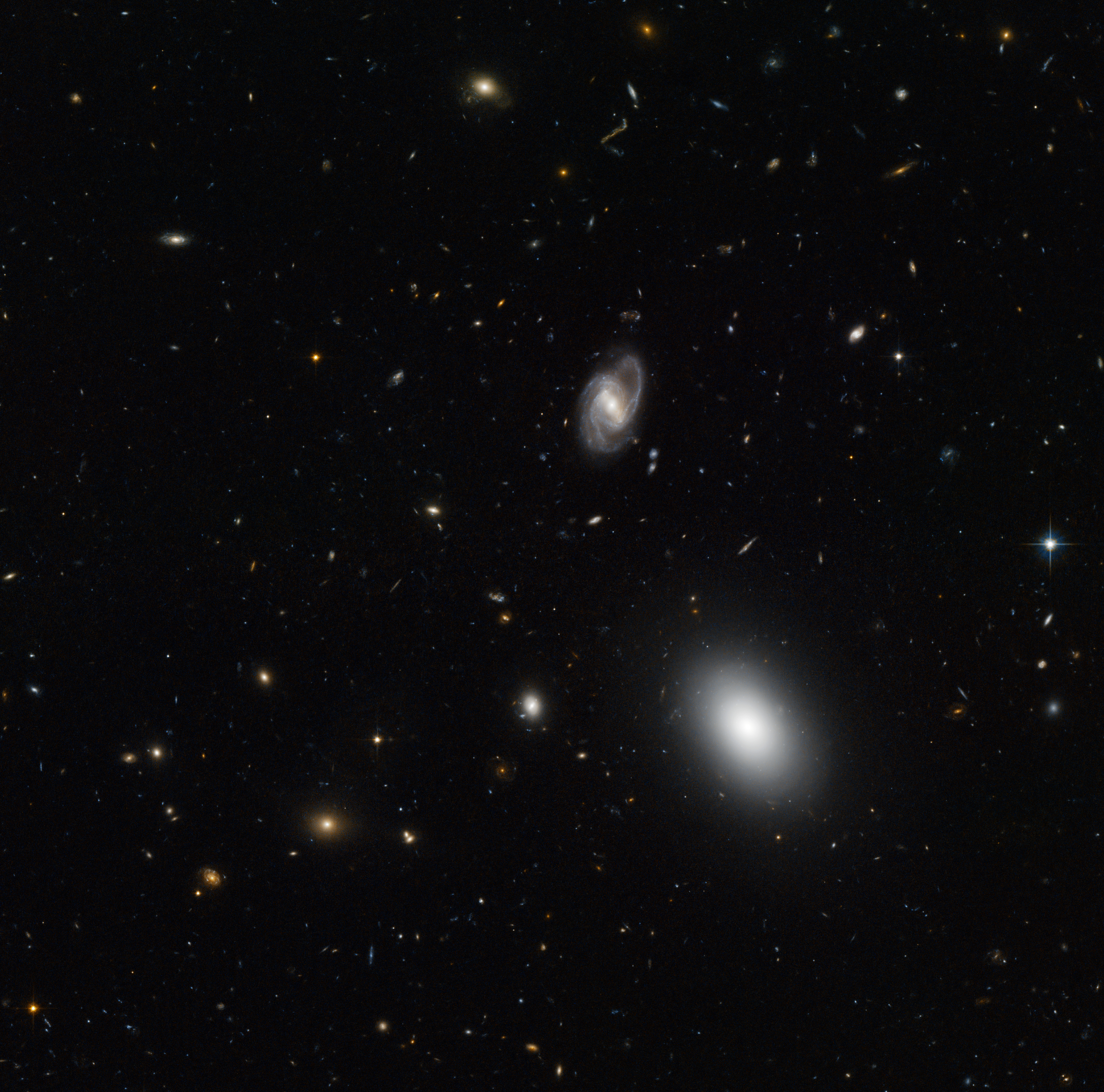
Extended Groth Strip taken with Hubble’s Advanced Camera for Surveys.

AEGIS, or the All-Wavelength Extended Groth Strip International Survey, is a multi-wavelength astronomical survey of a patch of the sky with low extinction and zodiacal scattering. The purpose of the survey is to study the physical processes and evolution of galaxies at redshift z ~ 1. As of February 2011 more than 80 research papers have been published based on data from the survey.

== Observatories ==
AEGIS makes use of multiple terrestrial and space based observatories to conduct the survey. These observatories make overlapping scans of the survey area. The primary telescopes are:

- Very Large Array
- Spitzer Space Telescope
- Palomar Observatory
- Canada-France-Hawaii Telescope
- Keck Observatory
- Hubble Space Telescope
- GALEX
- Chandra X-ray Observatory (AEGIS-X)

== See also ==
- Extended Groth Strip – a visible image taken by Hubble of the region.
