= Terence Tse =

Educator and financial commentator

- Education: Judge Business School, University of Cambridge
- Occupation: Associate professor of finance
- Website: www.terencetse.com

Terence Chee Ming Tse [謝慈銘] is an educator, speaker, advisor and commentator. He is a co-founder of Nexus FrontierTech, an artificial intelligence studio. Tse is an associate professor of finance at the ESCP business school, and Hult International Business School. In addition to working with the EU and UN, Tse regularly provides commentaries on the financial market in the Financial Times, The Guardian, The Economist, CNBC, the World Economic Forum and the Harvard Business Review blogs.

He has also appeared on radio and television shows on China’s CCTV, Channel 2 in Greece, France 24 and Japan’s NHK, and delivered speeches at the United Nations, the International Monetary Fund and the International Trade Centre. He was a keynote speaker at a Heads of Government Meeting alongside the premier of China and the prime minister of Latvia. The Financial Times named Tse 'Professor of the Week' for the FT lexicon in May 2013.

In 2017, through the DRIVE framework he co-created with Mark Esposito, Tse was shortlisted for the Thinkers50 Breakthrough Idea Award.

== Books ==
Tse’s books includes Understanding How the Future Unfolds: Using Drive to Harness the Power of Today's Megatrends (2017), co-authored with Mark Esposito. His second book, Corporate Finance: The Basics, came out in September 2017.
