= Extended Groth Strip =

Multiple exposure image of deep space in the constellation Boötes

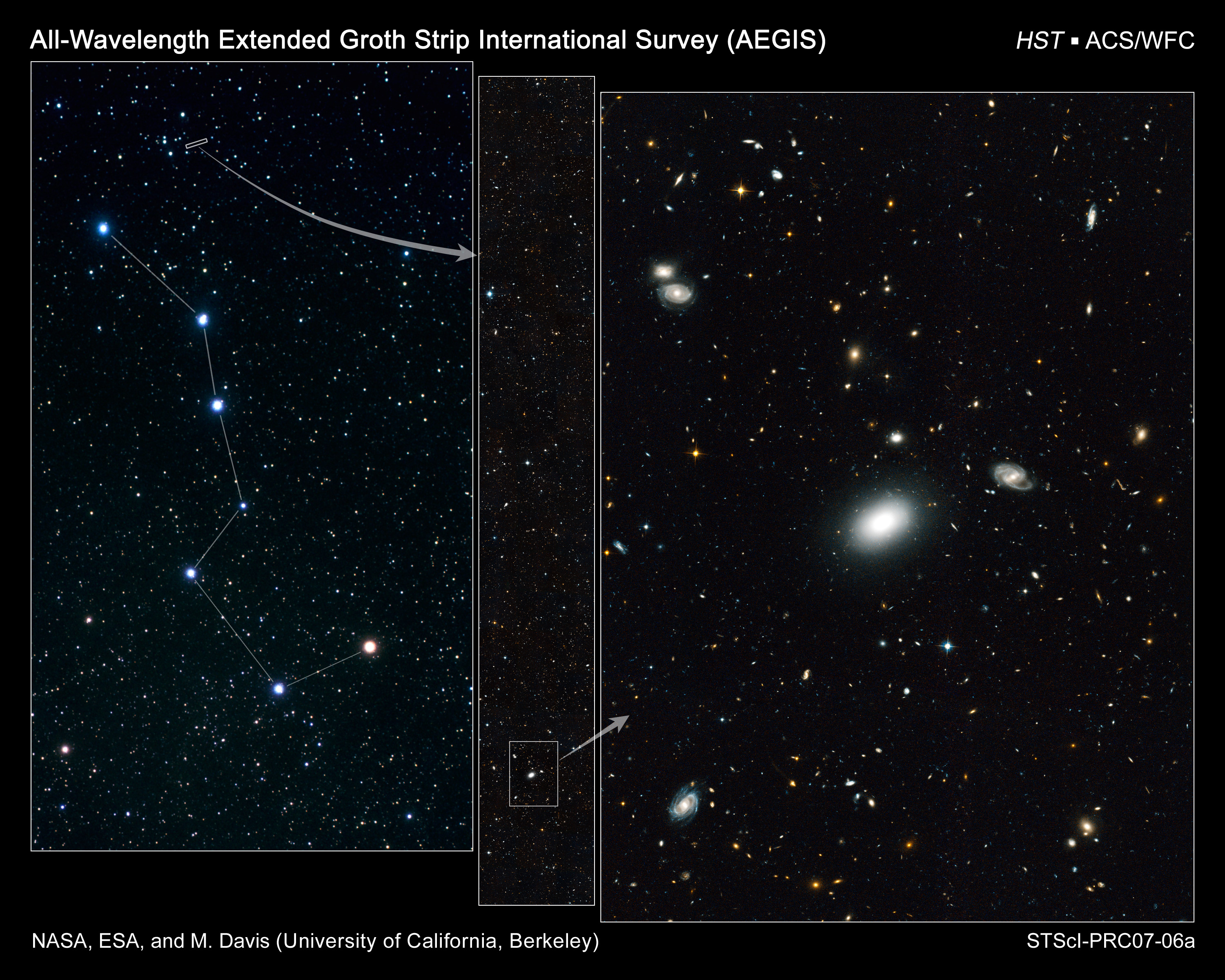
Diagram showing the size of the strip.

The Extended Groth Strip is an image of a small region between the constellations of Ursa Major and Boötes, based on the results of a series of observations by the Hubble Space Telescope. It covers an area 70 arcminutes across and 10 arcminutes wide, which correlates to a patch of sky roughly the width of a finger stretched at arm's length. The image was assembled from over 500 separate exposures taken with the Space Telescope's Advanced Camera for Surveys at 63 different pointings, spread out over the course of one year from June 2004 to March 2005. The complete image at the highest resolution in JPEG format is nearly 250 megabytes.

The Extended Groth Strip is named for Princeton University physicist Edward J. Groth. The project is jointly led by Sandra Faber, professor of physics and astronomy at the University of California, Santa Cruz, and Marc Davis, professor of astronomy at the University of California, Berkeley.

There are at least 50,000 galaxies in its view, giving new clues about the universe's youth, from its "preteen" years to young adulthood. The snowstorm of galaxies in the Hubble panorama does not appear evenly spread out. Some galaxies seem to be grouped together. Others are scattered through space. This uneven distribution of galaxies traces the concentration of dark matter, an invisible web-like structure stretching throughout space. Galaxies form in areas rich in dark matter.

In 2011, the All-Wavelength Extended Groth Strip International Survey used several telescopes to study the Extended Groth Strip. In 2022 the James Webb Space Telescope was pointed at the Extended Groth Strip by Cosmic Evolution Early Release Science (CEERS). The CEERS survey obtained novel data about the presence of massive galaxies with high redshift. As of May 2023, explanations for this are currently being debated.

The Extended Groth strip. Click on the image for a larger version.

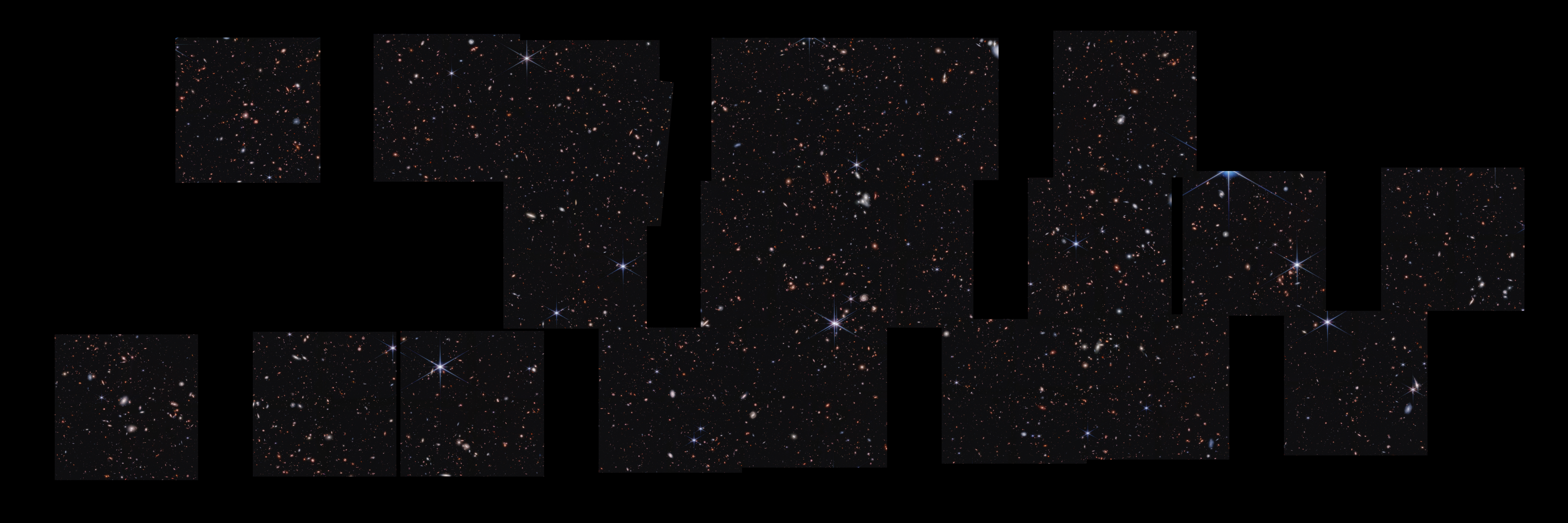
Cosmic Evolution Early Release Science (CEERS) survey (NIRCam image) - James Webb Space Telescope

== See also ==
- List of deep fields
