= Mark Esposito =

Italian-born Swiss economist

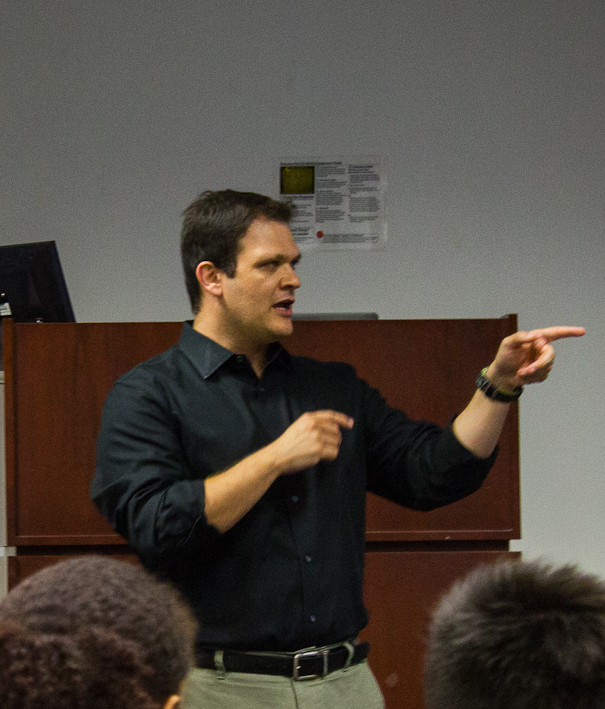
- Esposito lecturing at Harvard University, 2014.
- Occupations: Economist, public policy advisor, author, speaker, academic
- Title: Professor of Business & Economics (2008—present)

Academic background
- Education: Bachelor and Masters of Arts in Social Sciences (1999, University of Turin), Ph.D. in Business and Economics (2010, International School of Management), Post-doc (2011, Harvard Business School), Doctorate of Business Administration (2018, ENPC Paris Tech)
- Alma mater: University of Turin, International School of Management (Paris); École des ponts ParisTech

Academic work
- Discipline: Economics
- Sub-discipline: Public Policy, Artificial Intelligence, Circular Economy
- Institutions: Harvard University; Grenoble Ecole de Management; Hult International Business School; Arizona State University
- Main interests: Emerging Economies, Artificial Intelligence, Circular Economy
- Notable works: Understanding how the Future Unfolds; The AI Republic; The Great Remobilization: Strategies and Designs for a Global Smarter World
- Notable ideas: The circular economy, The DRIVE framework, the concepts of Fast Expanding Markets
- Website: www.mark-esposito.com

Mark Esposito is an American-based Swiss economist, social scientist, public policy advisor, speaker, and academic. Esposito holds appointments at Harvard University, Hult International Business School, Georgetown University. Esposito taught at Arizona State University (until 2022), and at Cambridge Judge Business School (until 2020). At Harvard, he serves as a faculty associate at the Berkman Klein Center for Internet and Society, the Davis Center for Russian and Eurasian Studies, and the Center for International Development. Esposito is Adjunct Professor of Strategy, Economics & Policy at Georgetown University’s McDonough School of Business. Esposito also holds positions at the University of Cambridge as a research fellow at Judge Business School and as a senior associate for the Cambridge Institute for Sustainability Leadership. He is also a global expert for the World Economic Forum and advises governments in the GCC and Eurasia regions. Esposito is known for co-developing the concept of "Fast-Expanding Markets" (FEMs), a framework for identifying untapped growth opportunities that challenge traditional market classifications, and for his research on governance, emerging economies, and sustainable development. He has co-founded ventures in AI and edtech. Esposito is also credited with co-developing the "More 3P AI Transformation Framework," which focuses on enhancing business processes through precision, personalization, and predictive capabilities. He is also known for his work on "design activism," (Note: With Olaf Groth and Terence Tse) advocating for intentional system redesign to address global challenges such as climate change and cybersecurity while promoting equity and sustainability.

== Early life and education ==
Esposito grew up between Italy, the United States and Canada. He returned to Italy and studied at the University of Turin where he got his BA and MA in human and social studies. Then, he moved again to the United States, where he resided in Boston. He pursued a doctoral degree in business and economics from the International School of Management in Paris, on a joint program with St. John’s University in New York City. Esposito completed his post-doctorate studies, first at Harvard Business School, and then in 2015 at the École des Ponts ParisTech's business school where he pursued an Executive Doctorate of Business Administration, which he defended in February 2018.

== Career ==
Esposito is a socio-economist who teaches systems thinking, business, government and society, modern dilemmas, and economic and strategic competitiveness at the Harvard Extension School and Harvard Summer School.

The Lab-Center for Competitiveness at Grenoble Ecole de Management, which he founded in 2009, studies competitiveness as a foundation for creating sustainable businesses, nations and societies, as well as the creation of equality in society. Their work involves researching and analysing the nature of competition and its implications in a range of contexts, and applying their research through the production of case studies. The Lab Centre is a member of the Microeconomics of Competitiveness Affiliate Network, originally developed by Michael E. Porter.

As an agenda contributor on the World Economic Forum, Esposito regularly contributes papers exploring the interplay between economics, business and society, the most recent of which offered a balanced perspective on the ongoing debate around artificial intelligence, the increasing automation of jobs, and the realistic implications for global employment.

In 2016, Esposito was appointed as research fellow at the Circular Economy Research Initiative at the Judge Business School, University of Cambridge.

Fast-expanding markets is a concept Esposito co-created with his long-term collaborators Terence Tse and Khaled Soufani (of the Judge Business School at the University of Cambridge).

=== Fast-expanding markets ===
Esposito, alongside Terence Tse and Khaled Soufani,^{[9]} co-developed the concept of "Fast-Expanding Markets" (FEMs) to redefine the identification and analysis of growth opportunities in the global economy. Dissatisfied with traditional classifications such as "emerging markets," which often focus on macroeconomic contexts and country-level analysis, they introduced FEMs as a more dynamic and granular approach. This framework highlights rapidly growing opportunities that transcend conventional boundaries of geography, industry, or firm size. FEMs emphasize market-driven growth and identify overlooked "pockets of excellence" at various levels, including regional, industrial, and microeconomic scales. By encouraging a bottom-up exploration of growth, this concept offers a paradigm shift in how businesses and policymakers uncover and leverage untapped economic potential.

Their work has also extended to applying the FEM framework to specific areas, such as the circular economy. They argue that the transition from a linear to a circular economic model exemplifies an FEM due to its rapid adoption and potential to generate new business models centered on sustainability, reuse, and resource efficiency. Through their research, Esposito, Tse, and Soufani provide a toolkit for identifying markets with transformative potential, urging leaders to look beyond traditional economic indicators and embrace novel, often counterintuitive opportunities.

=== On governance and emerging economies ===
In 2024, Esposito was featured in a faculty spotlight by Harvard's Center for International Development (CID), where he highlighted the rise of emerging economic epicenters, including cities such as Kigali, Bengaluru, and Dubai, as part of a new, polycentric global order. He emphasized the potential for these regions to "leapfrog" legacy systems by adopting advanced technologies, such as blockchain, to address governance challenges more efficiently.

=== The DRIVE framework ===
Esposito, together with Terence Tse, co-developed the DRIVE framework, a tool designed to analyze and anticipate global megatrends shaping business, social, and economic landscapes. DRIVE identifies five core trends: Demographic and social changes, Resource scarcity, Inequalities, Volatility, scale, and complexity, and Enterprising dynamics. This framework emphasizes the interconnected nature of these trends and their collective impact on global systems. It offers businesses and policymakers a structured approach to understand and adapt to future challenges by focusing on systemic shifts rather than isolated changes.

Esposito, along with co-authors Olaf Groth and Terence Tse, introduced the FLP-IT framework in their book "The Great Remobilization: Strategies and Designs for a Smarter Global Future." This strategic leadership model, which stands for Forces, Logic, Phenomena, Impact, and Triage, is designed to help leaders navigate complex global challenges. The authors previously discussed this framework in a 2021 article titled "FLP-IT Forward: A New Framework for Growth in the Post-Pandemic Era."

=== 3P AI ===
In November 2024, Esposito, along with co-authors Aurélie Jean, Terence Tse, and Danny Goh, introduced the "More 3P AI Transformation Framework" in an article published in The European Business Review. The framework emphasizes enhancing business processes through increased precision, personalization, and predictive capabilities.

=== Design activism ===
Esposito has been recognized for his contributions to the concept of "design activism," which he explores extensively in The Great Remobilization: Strategies and Designs for a Smarter Global Future, with Olaf Groth and Terence Tse. The book emphasizes the need for leaders to adopt a proactive role as "design activists," engaging in the intentional redesign of global systems to address challenges such as climate change, cybersecurity, and geopolitical tensions. Esposito advocates for integrating principles of equity, sustainability, and resilience into systemic solutions, emphasizing collaboration across diverse stakeholders and sectors.

== Publications ==
=== Books ===
- Mark, Esposito (2007). Sustainable Future of Mankind. Boris Maraz. with Timi Ecimovic, Lloyd Williams, and Roger Haw
- Mark, Esposito (2009). Put Your Corporate Social Responsibility Act Together!. Tate Publishing.
- Mark, Esposito (2009). Sustainable Strategies in Travel & Tourism. IRDO, Institute for the Development of Social Responsibility.
- Mark, Esposito (2011). The M3C Model of Cooperative Contextual Change. Tate Publishing. with Lloyd Williams and Alessandro Biscaccianti
- Mark, Esposito (2010). Sustaining the (dis)Integrated Systems: Which Future for Mankind?: A Reflective Journey on Today's Sustainability Dilemmas. LAP LAMBERT Academic Publishing. with Timi Ecimovic, Matjaz Mulej, and Roger Haw
- Mark, Esposito (2010). Emotional Intelligence & Hospitality. Tate Publishing. with Alessandro Cavelzani
- Mark, Esposito (2010). Sustainable Future of Mankind III. SEM Institute for Climate Change. with Timi Ecimovic, Matjaz Mulej, and Roger Haw
- Mark, Esposito (2012). Business Ethics: A Critical Approach: Integrating Ethics Across the Business World. Routledge. with Patrick O'Sullivan and Mark Smith
- Mark, Esposito (2015). The Philosophy, Politics and Economics of Finance in the 21st Century: From Hubris to Disgrace (Economics as Social Theory). Routledge. with Patrick O'Sullivan and Nigel F. B. Allington
- Mark, Esposito (2017). Understanding How the Future Unfolds: Using DRIVE to Harness the Power of Today's Megatrends. Lioncrest Publishing. with Terence Tse
- Mark, Esposito (2018). Africa's Competitiveness in the Global Economy. Palgrave Macmillan. with Ifedapo Adeleye
- Mark, Esposito (2019). The AI Republic: Building the Nexus between Humans and Intelligent Automation. Lioncrest Publishing. with Terence Tse and Danny Goh
- Groth, Olaf; Esposito, Mark; Tse, Terence (2023). The Great Remobilization: Strategies and Designs for a Smarter Global Future. Cambridge, MA: MIT Press.

=== Review literature articles ===
- Esposito, Mark, Amit Kapoor, and Sandeep Goyal. "Enabling healthcare services for the rural and semi‐urban segments in India: when shared value meets the bottom of the pyramid." Corporate Governance: The international journal of business in society 12, no. 4 (2012): 514-533. doi:10.1108/14720701211267847
- Matos Marques Simoes, Paula, and Mark Esposito. "Improving change management: How communication nature influences resistance to change." Journal of Management Development 33, no. 4 (2014): 324-341. doi:10.1108/jmd-05-2012-0058
- Santora, Joseph C., James C. Sarros, Gil Bozer, Mark Esposito, and Andrea Bassi. "Nonprofit executive succession planning and organizational sustainability." The Journal of Applied Management and Entrepreneurship 20, no. 4 (2015): 66-83. doi:10.9774/GLEAF.3709.2015.se.00006
- Groth, Olaf J., Mark Esposito, and Terence Tse. "What Europe needs is an innovation‐driven entrepreneurship ecosystem: Introducing EDIE." Thunderbird International Business Review 57, no. 4 (2015): 263-269. doi:10.1002/tie.21709
- Min, Maung, Francois Desmoulins-Lebeault, and Mark Esposito. "Should pharmaceutical companies engage in corporate social responsibility?." Journal of Management Development 36, no. 1 (2017): 58-70. doi:10.1108/jmd-09-2014-0103
- Esposito, Mark, Terence Tse, and Khaled Soufani. "Is the circular economy a new fast‐expanding market?." Thunderbird International Business Review 59, no. 1 (2017): 9-14. doi:10.1002/tie.21764
- Esposito, Mark, Terence Tse, and Khaled Soufani. "Introducing a circular economy: New thinking with new managerial and policy implications." California Management Review 60, no. 3 (2018): 5-19. doi:10.1177/0008125618764691
- Goyal, Sandeep, Mark Esposito, and Amit Kapoor. "Circular economy business models in developing economies: lessons from India on reduce, recycle, and reuse paradigms." Thunderbird International Business Review 60, no. 5 (2018): 729-740. doi:10.1002/tie.21883
- Goyal, Sandeep, Bruno S. Sergi, and Mark Esposito. "Literature review of emerging trends and future directions of e-commerce in global business landscape." World Review of Entrepreneurship, Management and Sustainable Development 15, no. 1-2 (2019): 226-255. doi:10.1504/WREMSD.2019.098454

== Award and honors ==
Year	Recognition
2023	Shortlisted for the Thinkers50 Strategy Award for the work on The Great Remobilization
2023	Edification of the "Mark Esposito Chair of Industrial Transitions" at Woxsen University, India
2021–2023	World's Top 50 Influencers in the Field of Global Sustainability, Thinkers 360
2019	Global 100 Influencers, MIT Technology Review
2017	CK Prahalad Breakthrough Idea Award by Thinkers50, London, UK (Note: Through the DRIVE framework he co-created with Terence Tse)
2017	Teaching Excellence Award, Harvard University, Fall 2014, 2015, 2016, 2017
2016	Thinkers50 Radar: Recognized among the 30 most influential business thinkers in the world, on the rise, London, UK
2015	Tomorrow's Thought Leader Recognition, Thinkers50, London, UK
