= Miles Groth =

American philosopher (born 1946)

Dr. Miles Groth (born 1946) is a Professor Emeritus in Psychology at Wagner College who has written on philosophy and therapy.

== Background ==
Groth has described himself as a daseinanalyst. Educated at Franklin and Marshall College, Duquesne University and Fordham University, he has taught psychology and philosophy at St. Vincent College (Latrobe, Pennsylvania) and Wagner College (Staten Island, New York), where he is Professor Emeritus (2019).

== Advocacy ==
In 2013 Miles Groth gave a lecture at a conference at the University of Toronto titled "Caring About University Men - Why We Need Campus Men’s Centres in a Time of Crisis". He is co-editor of Engaging College Men: Discovering What Works and Why (2010; 2nd rev. ed, 2019).

== Authorship ==
Groth is the author of chapters in books on therapy, and numerous articles and book reviews in psychology and philosophy journals. He is the author of After Psychotherapy (2017; 2nd ed. 2018) and Pericopes (a privately printed collection of poems).

Groth has also produced three books about Martin Heidegger and two studies of Medard Boss. Groth believes that many of the existing English translations of Heidegger are inadequate and incomprehensible.

Groth claims that in contrast with many existing English translations Heidegger's works are "quite clear and concise."

His Heidegger books are titled Preparatory Thinking in Heidegger's Teaching (1987), The Voice that Thinks: Heidegger Studies (1997; rev and expanded ed. 2016) Translating Heidegger (2004; 2nd ed. 2017), the related Medard Boss and the Promise of Therapy (2020) and Why in the World not? An Introduction to Daseinanalysis (2024)

== Editorship ==
As founding editor of Thymos: Journal of Boyhood Studies he has advanced the interdisciplinary area known as male studies. He has lectured on the topic of boys' and men's well-being in Australia and Canada, and Germany as well as the United States. He is founding editor of New Male Studies: An International Journal.
