= Association for the Education and Guardianship of International Students =

United Kingdom schools and guardianship accreditation charity

- Abbreviation: AEGIS
- Formation: 1994
- Type: Educational charity
- Registration no.: 1111384
- Legal status: Registered charity
- Purpose: Educational accreditation
- Location: Stroud, Gloucestershire, England
- Region served: United Kingdom
- Services: Accreditation, conferences
- Fields: Schools, guardianship organizations
- Chair: Adam Lubbock
- CEO: Yasemin Wigglesworth
- Affiliations: Charity Commission for England and Wales
- Website: www.aegisuk.net

The Association for the Education and Guardianship of International Students (AEGIS) is concerned with the welfare and well-being of international students at boarding schools in the United Kingdom, especially as the leading organization with respect to associated organizational accreditation within the UK. This is pertinent for Educational Guardianship companies.

AEGIS was founded in 1994. It is a registered charity with the Charity Commission for England and Wales. Its activities include inspection and accreditation of guardianship organisations. Organizations can receive AEGIS certification. AEGIS also organizes conferences for schools and guardianship organisations and schools covering care and protection of international students. The charity is recognised by the Home Office of the UK Government. AEGIS partners with other relevant organizations. It helps to maintain and improve guardianship standards. It also aids with contracts between parents and guardians.

AEGIS is based in Stroud, Gloucestershire, England. It was granted charitable status in 2005. It has helped ensure that overseas students have an appropriate temporary guardian during the COVID-19 pandemic.
