= Olaf Groth =

German-American innovation scholar

Olaf J. Groth
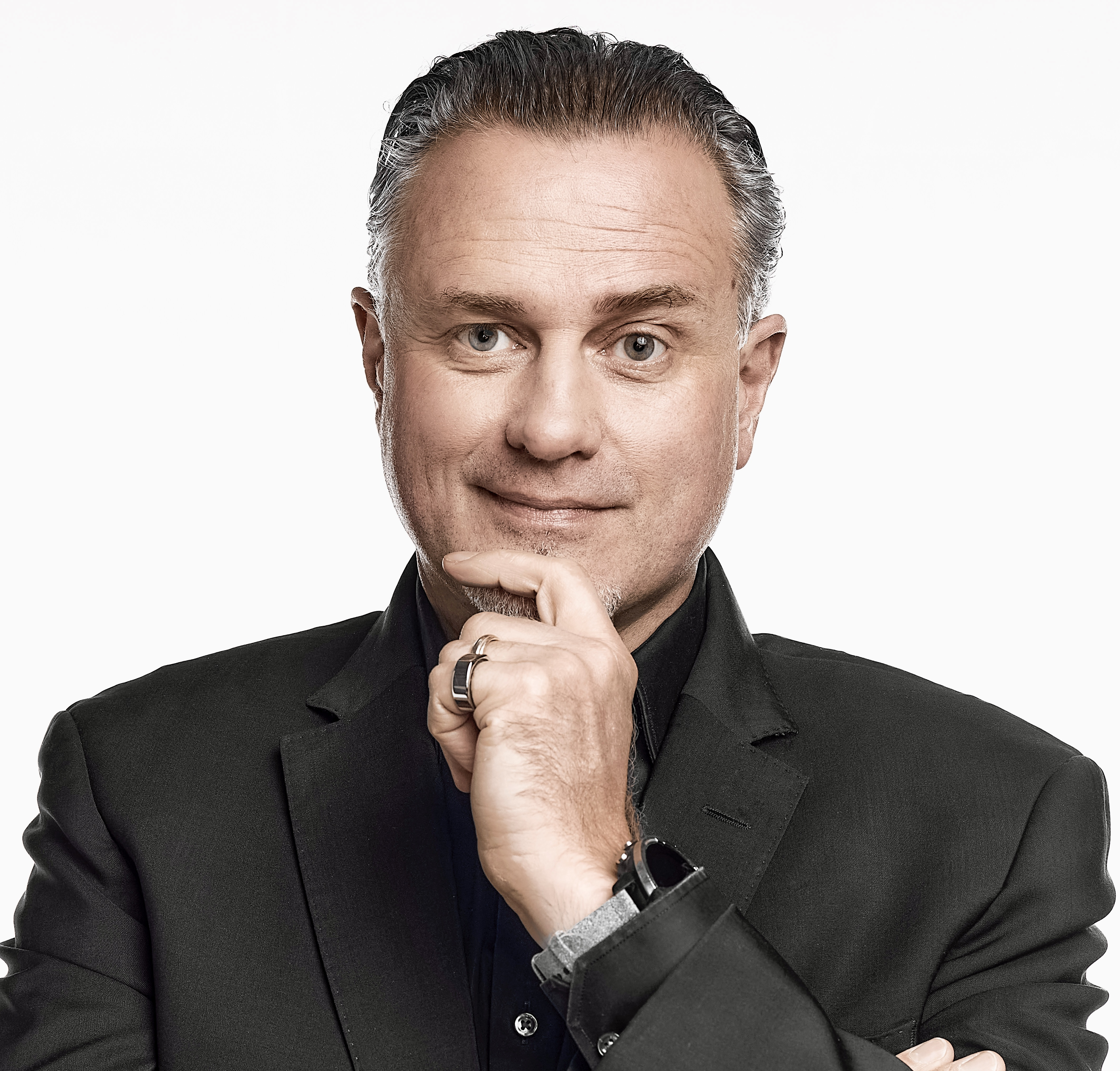
- Groth in 2021
- Occupations: Academic, author, speaker, advisor, futurist, strategist
- Employer(s): University of California, Berkeley Haas School of Business, Hult International Business School, UT Malaysia AI Faculty
- Title: Professional Faculty, Professor of Practice, Adjunct Professor

Academic background
- Education: B.A.I.R., M.A.I.P.S., M.A.L.D., Ph.D.
- Alma mater: Fletcher School at Tufts University, Middlebury Institute of International Studies

Academic work
- Discipline: Innovation, strategy, futures, policy, global economy
- Sub-discipline: AI and emerging technology
- Institutions: UC Berkeley Haas School of Business, Hult International Business School, UT Malaysia AI Faculty, Cambrian Futures
- Notable works: The Great Remobilization: Strategies & Designs For A Smarter Future, Solomon’s Code: Humanity in a World of Thinking Machines

Olaf J. Groth is a German-American futurist, strategist, scholar and author for AI, data and emerging tech transformations of organizations, economies and geopolitics. Groth is a professional faculty for global foresight, strategy, innovation and policy at UC Berkeley Haas School of Business. At Berkeley, he is the faculty director for the Berkeley Executive Education program Future of Technology/Emerging Technologies Strategies, a senior adviser and executive-in-residence at the Institute for Business Innovation and a startup mentor at Berkeley Skydeck. He has been an honorary adjunct professor at University of Technology Malaysia since May 2024. Groth started teaching as professor of practice at Hult International Business School in 2012 and transitioned to adjunct professor of practice in 2023. He is the co-founder and CEO of Cambrian Futures and Cambrian Labs, and he sits on the advisory and ethics board at Hayden AI. Groth has been a member of the Global Expert Network for the 4th Industrial Revolution, the Global Alliance for AI Governance (AIGA) at the World Economic Forum.

== Early life and education ==
Groth was born and raised in northwestern Germany in a rural, agricultural setting between Düsseldorf and the Dutch border. His parents were both initially blue-collar workers and children of World War II. Groth was the first in his family to attend college. Groth has a Bachelors of International Relations and a Masters of International Policy Studies (MAIPS), both with economics focus, from the Middlebury Institute of International Studies at Monterey, a Master of Arts in law and diplomacy (MALD), and a Ph.D. in international relations, with business, economics and tech focus, from Fletcher School at Tuft University. Initially planning to spend a year in the United States on a full scholarship, Groth stayed and relocated permanently.

In a December 2024 interview with former Indonesian minister and podcast producer Gita Wirjawan, Groth credited both his parents for shaping his character and career. His mother, said Groth, had emphasized diligence and kindness, while his father had fostered his intellectual curiosity and empathy about societal, economic, and business issues.

== Career and contributions ==
Groth began his career as a research associate at the Fletcher School of Law & Diplomacy, Tufts University, in 1995. He also served as a teaching associate for its Kuwaiti Foreign Service Training Program.

From 1997 to 2000, he worked at AirTouch Communications’ Satellite Services division and then as director at the Global Platform & Internet Services group of ATC’s acquirer Vodafone Group from 2000 to 2003, where he led new business development and international operations development, including the development of ventures in Indonesia, Malaysia, and the Caribbean.

In 2003, Groth joined Acme Innovation, a smart transportation solution provider, as Executive Vice President of Marketing and Business Development. The following year, he became executive director of strategy and business integration at Boeing International in Berlin, where he led strategic partnerships and negotiations.

From 2005 to 2007, he worked at Qualcomm as director of strategic finance and international market development, leading market development initiatives and mergers and acquisitions.

Between 2007 and 2011, Groth served as senior engagement leader at the Monitor Group, where he co-led strategic and innovation projects for global clients, including government and private sectors.

In 2011, he founded Emergent Frontiers Group (EFG), which then, through the collaboration with Mark Nitzberg, became Cambrian Futures & Cambrian Labs.

Groth joined Hult International Business School in 2012, teaching and developing programs in global strategy and innovation on campuses in San Francisco, New York, London, Dubai, Shanghai and Singapore. He held various leadership roles, including discipline lead for strategy, innovation & economics, until August 2023, and was voted professor of the year four times. In 2017, he gave a TedX talk on AI at Hult Ashridge.

At UC Berkeley, he first served as a visiting scholar at the Berkeley Roundtable on the International Economy (BRIE) and then as professional faculty at the Haas School of Business since 2019, teaching and directing programs in foresight, strategy, AI and emerging technologies. He also became senior adviser and executive-in-residence at the Institute for Business Innovation in 2023.

Groth emphasizes the importance of adaptive leadership in navigating structural transformations within global economies and organizations. He advocates for a leadership model that combines "Zeroth Principles Thinking" to uncover new operating logics amid upheaval, "Foresight and Systems Diagnostics" to anticipate systemic fragility, and "Empathy Across Tribes and Clubs" to bridge fragmented communities. In an interview with Adam Mendler, he further underscored the value of for leaders and organizations cultivating networks that can dynamically scale and adapt, ones that leverage emerging technologies, AI and data science to drive constructive change.

Groth co-authored Solomon’s Code in 2018 and its paperback version The AI Generation (2021). The books focus on global AI developments, their potential for humanity and their ethical and governance issues.

Groth co-authored the 2023 book The Great Remobilization (MIT Press), which emerged from webinars held during the COVID-19 pandemic. Together with colleagues Mark Esposito and Terence Tse, he examined systemic fragilities in the global economy and outlined strategies for turning disruption into opportunity. The book introduces Groth’s “6 Cs” framework—COVID, cognitive technologies, cybersecurity, crypto, climate change, and China—with cognitive technologies, particularly AI, serving as a unifying theme across governance, policy, and economic resilience.

The book won the 2024 Axiom Business Book Award, and was shortlisted for the 2024 PROSE Awards and the 2023 Thinkers50 Strategy Award.

In 2024, Groth was appointed honorary adjunct professor at Universiti Teknologi Malaysia, following his keynote at the national Malaysia AI Nexus event. He has served as a member of the Council for the Development of Artificial Intelligence, advising President Kassym-Jomart Tokayev of Kazakhstan since 2025.

Groth frequently speaks and moderates panels on AI-driven futures, strategies and transformations at the World Economic Forum's Annual meeting of the New Champions in Tianjin and Dalian, China.

== Selected publications ==
=== Books ===
- Groth, Olaf. The Great Remobilization: Strategies and Designs for a Smarter Global Future. MIT Press, 2023.
- Groth, Olaf J., and Mark Nitzberg. The AI Generation: Shaping Our Global Future with Thinking Machines, New York: Pegasus Books, 2021 (paperback version of Solomon’s Code).
- Groth, Olaf J., and Mark Nitzberg. Solomon's Code: Humanity in a World of Thinking Machines. New York: Pegasus Books, 2018.

=== Review articles ===
- Groth, Olaf, Tobias Straube, and Dan Zehr. "How to Run the World: Architecting the Agentic Twin Economy." California Management Review – Insights (December 3, 2025).
- Groth, Olaf, Tobias Straube, and Manu Kalia. "Why AI Needs Smart Investment Pathways to Ensure a Sustainable Impact." World Economic Forum (June 12, 2025).
- Groth, Olaf, Tobias Straube, and Jöran Altenberg. "AI Initiatives Don't Fail – Organizations Do: Why Companies Need AI Experimentation Sandboxes." California Management Review (May 22, 2025).
- Millar, Carla CJM, Olaf Groth, and John F. Mahon. "Management innovation in a VUCA world: Challenges and recommendations." California management review 61, no. 1 (2018): 5-14.
- Millar, Carla, Olaf Groth, and Johan Roos. "Management Innovation in an uncertain world." California Management Review (2016).
- Groth, Olaf J., Mark Esposito, and Terence Tse. "What Europe needs is an innovation‐driven entrepreneurship ecosystem: Introducing EDIE." Thunderbird International Business Review 57, no. 4 (2015): 263-269.
- Esposito, Mark, Olaf J. Groth, and Terence Tse. "The future of the global corporation: From fortress firms to cambrian corporations." Thunderbird International Business Review 57, no. 3 (2015): 255-260.
