= Carl-Gustav Groth =

Swedish transplant surgeon (1933–2014)

Carl-Gustav Groth (15 October 1933 – 16 February 2014) was a Swedish transplant surgeon. He studied in Colorado under the supervision of transplantation pioneer Thomas Starzl, and returned to Sweden to work at the Karolinska Institute and Karolinska University Hospital, where he performed the first pancreas, liver and islet cell transplantation surgeries in Sweden.

== Early life ==
Groth was born in 1933 in Helsinki to Carl-Johan Groth, a businessman, and Margareta Groth (née Sonkin). He and his parents moved to Stockholm during the Second World War, when he was aged 11. He studied medicine at the Karolinska Institute, receiving an MD in 1961.

== Career ==
Groth began his career at Serafimer Hospital in Stockholm, working in the department of surgery. He gained a PhD in 1965 with a thesis on red blood cell aggregation in trauma. After deciding to focus on transplantation surgery, Groth was awarded a research fellowship from the United States National Institutes of Health to study transplantation at the University of Colorado under the supervision of Thomas Starzl. When Starzl performed the first successful human liver transplantation in 1967, Groth was his surgical assistant. While in Colorado, Groth researched liver and lymphoid tissue transplantation in dogs, and made several important contributions to transplantation medicine, including the use of anti-lymphocyte globulin (ATG) use in acute organ rejection and the "triple-drug" immunosuppression regimen for post-transplantation patients including ATG, azathioprine and prednisone.

Groth returned to Stockholm in 1972, when he was chosen by Curt Franksson to head the transplantation program at the newly founded Huddinge Hospital (now Karolinska University Hospital). He pioneered transplantation of various organs, including the liver, pancreas, kidney and bone marrow, as well as xenotransplantation. He was the first surgeon in Sweden to perform pancreas transplantation (1974), liver transplantation (1984), and islet cell transplantation (1996). He published over 600 articles and a 1984 book, Pancreas Transplantation. He became a professor of surgery at the Karolinska Institute in 1983 and supervised 39 PhD dissertations.

Groth was a member of the Nobel Assembly at the Karolinska Institute from 1986 to 1999, and chaired the assembly in 1998. He was awarded H. M. The King's Medal in the 8th size with the Order of the Seraphim in 1998. He received the Transplantation Society's Medawar Prize in 2006. He was a consultant to the World Health Organization from 2005.

== Personal life and death ==
Groth married Birgit Hammargren, a teacher, in 1959 and had three children. He enjoyed sailing and won the Baltic Race in his yacht Supernova. He had numerous health issues after undergoing coronary artery bypass surgery in 2008, including haemorrhages related to anticoagulant medication, a pelvic fracture, and worsening frailty. He died on 16 February 2014.
